= List of people from Coimbatore =

The following is a list of notable people who were either born in, are current residents of, or are otherwise closely associated with or from the city of Coimbatore, India.

== A ==
- Aathmika (born 1993) – actor
- Athulya Ravi (born 1994) - actor
- Arjunan, K. (born 1957) – politician
- Anand, Balu (1954–2006) – director
- Anand, Vijay (born 1969) – politician
- Annadurai, Mylswamy (born 1958) – scientist
- Annam, Semmalar (born 1990) – actor
- Arunkumar, P. R. G. (born 1992) – politician
- Avinashilingam, T. S. (1903–1991) – educationist and politician
- Ashwin Kumar Lakshmikanthan (1991) – actor

== B ==
- Bakthavathsalam, G. (born 1942) – doctor
- Baladhandayutham, K. (1918–1973) – politician
- Balaji, Sriram (born 1990) – tennis player
- Balakrishnan, Jayanthasri (born 1957) – public speaker

== C ==
- Chenna Keshu, Subramanyan (1925–2023) – armed forces
- Chinnappa Thevar, M. M. A. (1915–1978) – film producer

== D ==
- Damodaran, G. R. (1914–1986) – educationist
- Dhanapal, Guru (1959–2014) – director
- Dinakaran, Padma (born 1966) – music director
- Doraisamy, R. – politician
- Doraiswamy, Gopalswamy (1893–1974) – inventor and engineer
- Durairaj, Nandha (born 1977) – actor
- Duraisamy, Thennavan (born 1966) – actor

== G ==
- Ghibran (born 1980) – music director
- Gnani (1935–2020) – writer
- Gopalan, Kasturi (1890–1974) – journalist
- Goundamani (born 1939) – actor
- Govindarajan, Mirudhubashini (born 1947) – doctor
- Govindasamy, P.S. (1856–1918) – educator and philanthropist
- Govindaswamy, K. (1907–1995) – industrialist

== H ==
- Hande, H. V. (born 1927) – doctor and politician
- Hariharan, Githa (born 1954) – author
- Harvey, Andrew (born 1952) – author, religious speaker

== J ==
- Jagadeesan, Narayan (born 1995) – cricketer
- Jayapal, Susheela (born 1962) – American politician
- Jayaram, K.R. – politician
- Jejjala, Vishnu (born 1975) – physicist

== K ==
- Kanagaraj, Lokesh (born 1986) – director and screenwriter
- Kandasamy, V.P. – politician
- Kandaswamy, K.V. (1926–2008) – politician
- Karivaradhan, Sundaram (1954–1995) – autoracer
- Karthick, Arun (born 1992) – director
- Karthik, Sabari (born 1990) – karate player
- Karthikeyan, Narain (born 1977) – autoracer
- Kathir, S. R. (born 1978) – cinematographer
- Kousik, Jagatheesan (born 1995) – cricketer
- Krishnan, Parvati (1919–2015) – politician]
- Kumar, Anupama (born 1974) – actor
- Kumar, Rajesh (born 1947) – writer
- Kumaraswamy, Sounthirajan – inventor
- Kuppuswami Naidu, G. (1884–1942) – entrepreneur
- Kuppuswamy, C. K. (born 1932) – politician

== L ==
- Lakshmanan, V.K. (1932–2012) – politician
- Lakshmi, C.S. (born 1944) – writer
- Lakshmi, Pavithra (born 1994) – actor
- Lakshmikanthan, Ashwin Kumar (born 1991) – actor
- Lakshminarayan, K.G. (born 1953) – former cricket player and umpire
- Leelakrishnan N. (born 1964) – autoracer
- Leon, Cottalango (born 1971) – technician

== M ==
- Mahalingam, N. (1923–2014) – industrialist
- Mahesh, Jaya (born 1969) – model
- Malaravan, T. – politician
- Manivannan, S.S. (1954–2013) – actor and director
- McCarthy, Charles (1899–1977) – cricketer
- Murugadas, Pithukuli (1920–2015) – singer
- Muruganantham, Arunachalam (born 1961) – entrepreneur
- Muthuraj, T. (born 1969) – production designer

== N ==
- Nagarajan, P (born 1963) – politician
- Natarajan, P.R. (born 1950) – politician
- Natarajan, Priyamvada (born 1985) – scientist
- Nanammal, V. (1920–2019) – yoga teacher
- Narasimhalu, S. P. (1854–1922) – entrepreneur and politician
- Narayan Rao, C. R. (1882–1960) – scientist
- Naren, Karthick (born 1994) – film director
- Naren Kumar, V.R. (born 1974) – autoracer

== O ==
- Om Prakash (born 1978) – cinematographer

== P ==
- Palanisami, V.C. (died 1965) – politician
- Palanisamy, N. (born 1948) – politician
- Pathy, Rajshree (born 1956) – businesswoman
- Prabhu, Leo (born 1933) – author
- Prahalad, C.K. (1941–2010) – economist
- Preman, Uma (born 1970) – social worker
- Pulamaipithan (1935–2021) – author

== R ==
- Radhakrishnan, C. P. (born 1957) – politician
- Raghavendra, Harish (born 1976) – playback singer
- Raj, P.L. (1934–2002) – choreographer
- Ramalingam, T.A. (1881–1952) – politician
- Ramanathan, M. (1934–2019) – politician
- Ramani, R.V. (born 1947) – doctor
- Ramraj, Nithya (born 1988) – athlete
- Ramraj, Vithya (born 1988) – athlete
- Ratnasabhapathy, C.S. (1886–1956) – industrialist
- Rajakantham, C.T. (1917–2002) – actor
- Ramachandran, K.V. (1917–2002) – music critic
- Ramani, K. (1916–2006) – politician
- Ravi, Athulya (born 1994) – actor
- Renga Iyengar, Kasturi (1859–1923) – journalist and politician

== S ==
- Sahasranamam, S.V. (1913–1988) – actor
- Sai Pallavi (born 1992) – actor
- Saleem, Mohammed – environmental activist
- Sarala (born 1962) – actor
- Saravanan, K.V. (born 1966) – director
- Sathyaraj (born 1954) – actor and director
- Senthil Kumar, U. K (born 1972) – cinematographer
- Shanmugavel, M. (1927–2007) – journalist
- Shanmukham, R. K. (1892–1953) – industrialist and politician
- Sinclair, Adam (born 1984) – hockey player
- Sivakumar (born 1941) – actor and public speaker
- Sreenivasan, Kasturiswami (1917–1991) – scientist
- Sreeram Kumar, D. (born 1971) – armed forces
- Srinivas, Aushik (born 1993) – cricketer
- Srinivasan, Vanathi (born 1970) – politician
- Sriramulu, S.M. (1910–1976) – film producer
- Subbarayan, K. (born 1952) – politician
- Subrahmanya Aiyar, K. V. (1875–1969) – historian
- Subramani, Sashikumar (born 1982) – actor
- Sundaram, V.A. (1896–1967) – independence activist

== T ==
- Thamarai (born 1965) – lyricist
- Thangadurai, Michael (born 1983) – actor
- Thyagarajan, Jaya (born 1956) – artist.

== U ==
- Unnikrishnan, K. P. (born 1936) – politician

== V ==
- Vaidyanathan, Nirupama (born 1976) – tennis player
- Vaishnav, G.R. (born 1990) – volleyball player
- Vasanth, SAC (born 1974) – magician
- Vasudev, Jaggi (born 1957) – spiritual guru
- Vasudevan, Mini (born 1965) – activist
- Velumani, S.P. (born 1969) – politician
- Venkatapathy, Adhithya (born 1990) – musician and actor
- Venugopal, Siddharth (born 1985) – actor
- Vijay, Pa (born 1974) – lyricist
- Vincent, Swamikannu (1883–1942) – cinema producer and pioneer
- Virali-Murugesan, Ranjeet (born 1985) – tennis player
- Vishwanath, Vichu (born 1960) – actor

== W ==
- Williams, Shanthi (born 1958) – actor

== Y ==
- Yoganathan, M. (born 1969) – activist
