= Borderless World Foundation =

Aid organization in Jammu and Kashmir

- Formation: 2002
- Founder: Bipin Takwale, Yogesh Pawar, Satish Kandhare, Adhik Kadam, Bharti Mamani, Gaurav Kaul, Tanvir Mir
- Founded at: Pune, Maharashtra
- Type: The Societies Registration Act, 1860, 80G, non-profit organization
- Purpose: Providing Human Touch To The Border Areas
- Headquarters: Pune, Srinagar
- Location: Maharashtra, Jammu and Kashmir
- Region served: India
- Services: Girls Education, Emergency Medicines, Women Empowerment, Orphanages,
- President: Adhik Kadam
- Founder, Director: Adhik Kadam
- Vice President: Yogesh Pawar
- Secretary: Gaurav Kaul
- Key people: Nitin Upadhye, Shahnawaz Sheikh Zahoor, Nighat Qureshi, Manisha Palaskar Suhail Masoodi, Jaywant Nigade, Dushyant Ashtekar
- Staff: 30
- Volunteers: 500+
- Website: www.borderlessworldfoundation.org

Borderless World Foundation (BWF) is a non-profit, non-governmental organization registered under India's Societies Registration Act, 1860. Working in Jammu and Kashmir, along the conflict-riven border region in between India, Pakistan & China, BWF has rescued hundreds of girls orphaned in the conflict along the India-Pakistan border. BWF carries out a variety of activities, including disaster relief and emergency medical support for the community and rescuing children left orphaned by the ongoing conflict.

== History ==
BWF was founded in 2002 by Adhik Kadam and Bharati Mamani in Pune, India.

== Programs ==
BWF works in education, health care, emergency medicine, and women's empowerment. The organization runs four homes for girls who have lost their parents in the armed conflict in Kashmir Valley, during Kargil War and 2005 Kashmir earthquake. BWF support girls' education, vocational training and mentoring for the purposeful life.

- Basera E Tabassum (BeT): A home for orphan girls started in District Kupwara, Srinagar, Anantnag, Budgam and Jammu with the help of the Silicon Valley chapter of Asha for Education.
- Kashmir Life Line (KLL): First critical care Emergency Medical Services started by BWF in Kashmir in partnership with National Securities Depository Limited (NSDL), DP World and Jammu & Kashmir health department. Through this program, BWF provided the first four ambulances for the public to the region.
- Rah-e-Niswan: Rah-e-Niswan helps the girls growing up in the BWF homes learn entrepreneurial skills and financial management. Established as the first ‘ladies-only’ business in the area and run by the young women of the BWF, it provides women in the larger community a safe and hesitation-free environment to shop for their requirements such as sanitary napkins.
- Surgeries of Pellet Victims: Following an upsurge of violence in 2016, BWF organized free surgeries for those at risk of losing their eyesight because of pellet gun injuries. BWF partnered with Aditya Jyot Eye Hospital, Sankara Eye Foundation in this effort. Conducted by leading surgeons from India, these operations saved the sight of hundreds of victims.
- Disaster relief: The BWF team has been a first responder in wake of many natural disasters, including the floods in 2014. BWF was able to recruit doctors and donations of medical supplies, including fully equipped ambulances, from across India to help the people in Kashmir.

== Awards and recognition ==
In 2010, BWF was presented the Harmony Foundation's "Mother Teresa Award" in the field of Social Justice and Peace by the Dalai Lama. Adhik Kadam and BWF were recognized in 2016 for their work by Indians for Collective Action.
