= I Don't Love You Anymore: Moving On and Living Your Best Life =

2024 poetry book by Rithvik Singh

- Author: Rithvik Singh
- Publisher: Penguin Random House India
- Publication date: May 2024
- Publication place: India

I Don't Love You Anymore: Moving On and Living Your Best Life is a 2024 poetry and self-help book by Indian author Rithvik Singh. Published by Penguin Random House India under its Ebury Press imprint, the book explores themes of heartbreak, emotional healing, and personal growth.

== Background ==
The book was released in May 2024 and consists of approximately 184 pages. It is part of Singh's body of work focused on contemporary poetry and emotional storytelling, often aimed at young readers navigating relationships and self-identity.

== Reception ==
The Kashmir Reader wrote a favorable review for the work.

Krishika Dinesh Rathod wrote for The Indian Express "This book is all about choosing yourself. Rithvik Singh explores the emotional weight of heartbreak and the importance of moving forward—not for anyone else, but for your own well-being."
