= Chandrakant Pandav =

Indian doctor

Chandrakant S. Pandav
- Education: AIIMS
- Scientific career
- Fields: Community Medicine

Dr. Chandrakant S. Pandav is an Indian doctor who works on combating the iodine deficiency disorders. He is one of the founding members and regional coordinators for South Asia of International Council for Control of Iodine Deficiency Disorders (IDD). He played a crucial role in the iodisation of salt in India, which has earned him the title of "The Iodine Man of India".

== Biography ==
Dr. Pandav completed his MBBS and MD in Community Medicine from All India Institutes of Medical Sciences, and received his M.Sc. with specialization in Health Economics, Clinical Epidemiology and Biostatistics from McMaster University in Hamilton, Ontario. He is a former professor and Head, Centre for Community Medicine (CCM), All India Institute of Medical Sciences (AIIMS), New Delhi. He has travelled over 60 countries. He has special interests in Music Therapy.

Dr. Pandav has been WHO and UNICEF consultant on iodine deficiency disorders since 1983. He was President of Indian Public Health Association from 2010 to 2013.

== Awards and recognition ==
- Padma Shri (fourth highest civilian award in India) (2021)
- Mother Teresa Memorial Award (2016)
- WHO Public Health Champion (2017)
- Dr. M.K. Seshadri Prize, Gold Medal by Indian Council of Medical Research (2000) for contributions in the field of Community Medicine
- Fellow at National Academy of Medical Sciences
- Fellow at Indian Public Health Association
- Fellow at Indian Association of Preventive and Social Medicine
- Delhi Ratna Awardee 2022
- Chief Mentor, All India Institute of Medical Sciences(AIIMS), Udaipur
- President, Indian Coalition for Control of Iodine Deficiency Disorders( ICCIDD)
- Iodine Global Network(IGN), South Asia Coordinator(1986–2020)
- Founding Member, International Council for Control of Iodine Deficiency Disorders 1986
- Chief Mentor, World Federation for Non Communicable Diseases(NCD)
- President, Indian Public Health Association(IPHA) 2010–2013
- Vice President, Indian Public Health Association(IPHA) 2004–2009
- Member, Rashtriya POSHAN(Prime Minister's Overarching Scheme for Holistic Nutrition) Abhiyan
- President, Indian Association of Preventive and Social Medicine(IAPSM), 2007
- The Coalition for Food and Nutrition Security(CFNS) chairperson from July 2019 – October 2020
- Vice President, Trans Asian Chamber of Commerce, India(TACCI)
- President, Rainbow Cold Laser Institute, New Delhi
- Chairperson, International Integrated Medical Professionals Association (IIMPA), Pune, Maharashtra
- Chairperson, Divine Campus Foundation
- Chief Mentor, Integrative Global Health And Wellness For Happiness And Peace
- Patron, International Council for Social And Economic Development
- Chief Mentor, Vivekanand Academy, Pune, Maharashtra
