= Adhik Kadam =

Indian social entrepreneur

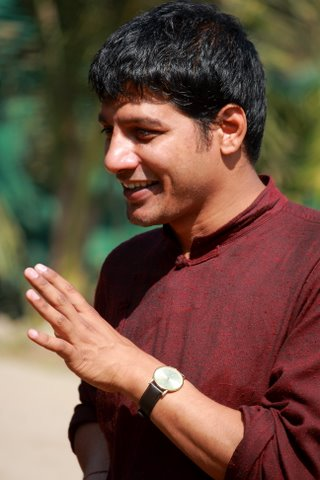
- Adhik Kadam at village, Sulkoot Kupwara, Jammu and Kashmir
- Born: Adhik Sadashiv Kadam; 23 August 1977 (age 49); Pune, Maharashtra
- Education: Master of Arts in Political science
- Alma mater: Bharati Vidyapeeth, Sir Parashurambhau College, Savitribai Phule Pune University
- Occupations: Social entrepreneur, social activist, peace maker
- Years active: 1996–present
- Known for: Borderless World Foundation, Basera E Tabassum
- Spouse: Chahat
- Parent(s): Vimal Kadam, Sadashiv Kadam

Adhik Kadam is an Indian social entrepreneur and philanthropist. He is a chairman and co-founder of Borderless World Foundation, an NGO working in conflict zones of Jammu and Kashmir. The NGO runs five orphanage homes for girls in five districts of Jammu and Kashmir.

== Career ==
Early in his career, Kadam worked for many non-profit organizations as a volunteer. He started visiting Kashmir on an educational tour in 1997. At the age of 19, he visited a Kashmiri Pandit refugee camp in Jammu to observe their conditions. During the Kargil War, he worked on the forefront, especially for the refugees who were displaced in Kargil, Batalik and Drass Sectors. Later he worked with Balraj Puri and the Institute of J & K Affairs on the project of "Children affected by armed conflict in Jammu & Kashmir" which was sponsored by UNICEF.

He founded the Borderless World Foundation (BWF) in 2002 with another activist from Pune, Bharati Mamani and a local resident, Mohiuddin Mir who had been active in the region since 1998. The primary objective of the NGO was to assist orphans and provide for their basic necessities with a focus on education. They worked extensively under the project of "Basera-e-Tabassum" (Abode of Smiles) to establish orphanages for girls in the Kupwara district and later in Budgam district. Mohiuddin Mir was killed in 2005 by militants. From only 2 girls in 2002, the foundation has grown to accommodate more than 220 girls falling in the age group of 18 months to 20 years at four centers and can support at least 1000+ girls in the state of Jammu and Kashmir. The first center was established in the Sulkoot village of Kupwara.

Kadam has opened several group homes for orphans of the war, particularly females who according to him are the most vulnerable in conflict situations. He was kidnapped by militants who suspected him of working for intelligence agencies but was released on the intervention of locals. He was later detained by security forces who had grown suspicious of him as he was released by the militants unharmed. Kadam is said to lead an ascetic lifestyle having dedicated his life to service and lives as described by an article in India Currents magazine as a "penniless vagabond". He considers his work to be a spiritual journey.

== Borderless World Foundation ==
Kadam started Borderless World Foundation (BWF) in 2002 with the objective of creating a more humanitarian world. While conducting a children-centric socio-economic survey of the region, he gained insight into the challenges of the people living in these areas. He has worked on various ad hoc programs for local communities with am emphasis on those who had been widowed in the conflict before founding the organisation.

Currently, the BWF houses around 230 girls. More than 110 girls have been re-integrated into their communities and 40 are pursuing higher education. Kadam hopes to restore a "culture of faith" to the communities of Kashmir. The BWF currently has various ongoing projects and programs for humanitarian purposes.

=== Basera-e-Tabassum ===
Kadam initiated Basera-e-Tabassum (BeT), a shelter program established in 2002 for girls who lost their parents as a result of the armed conflict or terrorism during the ongoing Kashmir conflict. The four centers (group-homes) in Kashmir region are called Basera-e-Tabassum (abode of smiles) and the one in Jammu is called Fah (Facilitate and accomplish with humility). The BeT centers also assist mothers who have lost their husbands in the conflict in providing financial and material aid to their children. The BeT is supported by a few prominent philanthropists and well-wishers like the Holkar Family, Syed Ata Hasnain, Balraj Puri and Dr. S.Natarajan. The BeT also maintains facilities which allow children to travel to various cities for educational and exposure tours, and for higher education in professional courses.

=== Kashmir Life Line ===
Kashmir Life Line is an ambulance service launched in 2015 with the aid of the Government of Jammu and Kashmir. Kadam, during his time, working in Kashmir had witnessed many deaths because of lack of emergency services for medical emergencies. He initiated the Kashmir Life Line medical services in the Kashmir Valley to help remedy the issue. Border Security Force and J&K, Directorate of Health Services are also partnering in this project and run ambulances in border areas under this project.

Kotak Mahindra Bank under their CSR initiatives donated 5 critical care ambulances to BWF and Indian Army in 2021 in the presence of Shri Rajnath Singh, Defence Minister, Government Of India 2021

=== Helping pellet victims ===
In the 2016–17 Kashmir unrest, due to use of pellet guns by security forces, many children and youths aged between 10 and 30 got completely or partially blinded, during protests and curfews. More than 1200 cases were registered in hospitals. who were in need of treatment from specialists; otherwise they could lose their vision permanently. Kadam assisted in humanitarian efforts with the help of the BWF by organizing doctors from across India, and asking them to come to Kashmir to perform eye surgeries for free. Dr. S N Natarajan at Aditya Jyot Hospital, and, Dr. Mahesh P Shanmugam and Sankara Eye Foundation at L V Prasad Hospital helped with recommending experts and provided free surgeries. Kadam had brought more than a dozen doctors to Kashmir to perform some of the most critical surgeries in SMHS Hospital in Srinagar.

=== Rah-e-Niswan ===
"Rah-e-Niswan" (women's way), is a social entrepreneurship campaign in Kupwara. Initiated by Kadam, it is a project for women entrepreneurs in Jammu and Kashmir. The project trains girls in making sanitary napkins, computerized embroidery, stitching, knitting, fabric painting, and tailoring. The aim of the project is to assist them in being self-sufficient and financially independent. Kadam has also helped young girls and boys to find jobs in various cities.

=== Project DALPARI ===
Adhik started a Mobile Medical Unit named "DAL Pari" in Dal Lake, Srinagar, in 2023. The launch of the first floating Mobile Medical Unit in Dal Lake is a commendable effort to provide primary healthcare services to the community in Srinagar. This innovative project is likely to have a positive impact on the health and well-being of the residents in the area.

The "DAL Pari" project aims to address the healthcare needs of the community by delivering medical services in a distinctive environment such as Dal Lake. The floating Mobile Medical Unit is expected to bring healthcare services closer to the people, particularly those residing in regions that may be difficult to reach through conventional means.

This initiative reflects a commitment to improving healthcare accessibility and contributing to the overall well-being of the community.

=== Jammu Life Line ===
"Jammu Life Line" was launched in 2017 by Kadam. It is an ambulance service started for the people on the border districts of the Jammu region. Kadam started the project after documenting the lives of people living on the Line of Control (LoC). The Indo-Pakistan border at LoC is considered perilous where skirmishes occur occasionally and sometimes result in civilian casualties. The Jammu Life Line project is also partnered with the Border Security Force.

== In popular culture ==
Kadam has given inspirational talks at various platforms. He was a speaker at a TED (conference) at Rajarambapu Institute of Technology(RIT). He has also been a speaker at Stanford University, UC Berkeley, Princeton University and at various Rotary International clubs. He also appeared in Kon Honar Karodpati television show.

Kadam was a finalist and speaker for National Conference on Social Innovation (NCSI) in 2018 organised by Pune International Centre, National Innovation Foundation and Tata Institute of Social Sciences. He was named an INK Fellow at the 2016 INK Conferences.

== Awards and recognition ==
- Mother Teresa Awards in 2010.
- The Spirit of Mastek award by Mastek foundation in April 2012.
- Youth Icon for the year 2012 by Maharashtra Times of The Times Group
- Yuwanmesh 2011 award by Indradhanu Foundation
- CSO Partners Outstanding Annual Report Awards 2009 for transparency, accountability and best documentation process in NGO sector in India.
- NBC Awards 2017.
- ICA Awards 2016.
- Savitri Sanman 2016
- ROTARY Humanity Hero Award 2020
- CNN-News18 Indian of the Year, For Social Change by CNN
