= Jusoor =

Jusoor NGO founded in 2011 supports Syrian children, students and youth

Jusoor (Arabic: جسور, romanized: bridges) is an international non-governmental organization founded in 2011 by members of the Syrian diaspora, including Rania Succar, CEO of Intuit Mailchimp, and Dania Ismail. Based in the United States and registered as a 501(c)(3) nonprofit, Jusoor operates across Lebanon, Jordan, Syria, and other countries with significant Syrian refugee populations. Jusoor provides scholarships, education for refugees, and career development opportunities for Syrians.

Jusoor was among the organizations that received a share of MacKenzie Scott's philanthropic $2.7 billion donation in 2021.

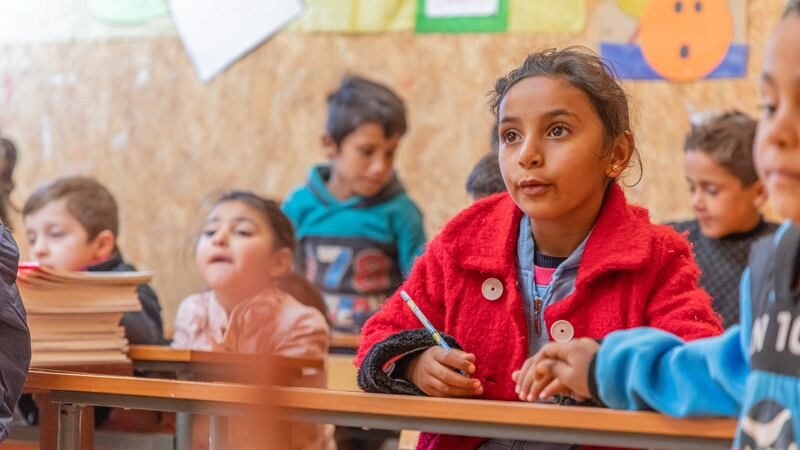
Syrian refugee children at Jusoor Jurahiya Education Center in Lebanon

== History ==
Jusoor was co-founded by Rania Succar, CEO of Intuit Mailchimp, Dania Ismail, and other Syrian diaspora professionals in 2011. The organization's initial focus was providing mentorship and scholarships to Syrian students pursuing studies abroad. Due to the Syrian refugee crisis, Jusoor later expanded to Lebanon to serve the large population of Syrian refugee children with community centers and literacy programs. It also expanded to offer entrepreneurship and career development programs in countries with a high concentration of Syrian refugees.

== Programs and Impact ==
Refugee Education Program: Jusoor runs education programs for Syrian refugee children in Lebanon reaching 15,000 students. The program runs community centers to support students with literacy as well as access to computers, books, and mentors. The program serves 1,200 Syrian refugee children per year.

Scholarships Program: Jusoor’s Scholarships program supports Syrian high school graduates to secure university admissions abroad. Jusoor has provided scholarships to 390 students since its inception in 2011.

Entrepreneurship Program: Jusoor runs trainings, mentorship, and pitching competitions for Syrian entrepreneurs in diaspora. At the beginning of 2024, Jusoor’s online incubator for startups was certified by the European Foundation for Management Development under its Online Course Certification System (EOCCS).

== Awards & Recognition ==
Jusoor received the Mother Teresa Award for Social Justice in 2024.

Jusoor co-founder Rania Succar received the Outstanding Arab American of the Year Award in 2023 for her work with Jusoor.

Jusoor received the TAKREEM Humanitarian and Civic Services Award in 2017.
