= July unrest =

July unrest may refer to:

- July 2009 Ürümqi riots, in Xinjiang, China that broke out on 5 July 2009
- 2016–2017 Kashmir unrest, in the Kashmir, India
- 2021 South African unrest, in Gauteng and Kwa-Zulu Natal provinces of South Africa that took place from 9 to 18 July 2021
