= Nazhikakkallu =

- Directed by: Sudin Menon
- Written by: Sudin Menon; Sreekumaran Thampi (dialogues)
- Screenplay by: Sudin Menon
- Produced by: C Vasudevan Nair
- Starring: Prem Nazir; Sheela; Ramachandran; Sankaradi
- Cinematography: C Vasudevan Nair
- Edited by: Devadas
- Music by: Kanu Ghosh
- Production company: VS Pictures
- Distributed by: VS Pictures
- Release date: 21 November 1970
- Country: India
- Language: Malayalam

Nazhikakkallu is a 1970 Indian Malayalam film, directed by Sudin Menon and produced by C Vasudevan Nair. The film stars Prem Nazir, Sheela, Ramachandran and Sankaradi in the lead roles. The musical score was created by Kanu Ghosh.

== Cast ==
- Prem Nazir as Suresh
- Sheela as Leela
- Ramachandran
- Sankaradi
- T. R. Omana as Mrs. Menon
- Bahadoor as Pachupilla
- G. K. Pillai as Aadi narayanan Thambi
- Kaduvakulam Antony as Thomas
- M. L. Saraswathi
- Madhubala
- Nellikode Bhaskaran as Kurup
- Omana
- P. R. Menon
- S. P. Pillai as Gopalan
- Shyam Kumar
- Sreekumar
- Treesa
- Usha
- Usharani as Vidhya (Suresh's Sister)
- Vincent
- Shylashri
- Devan
- Nambyar
- Gopi Chandran
- Ramachandran
- Vineeth
- Kamalam

== Soundtrack ==
The music was composed by Kanu Ghosh and the lyrics were written by Sreekumaran Thampi.

| No. | Song | Singers | Lyrics | Length (m:ss) |
|---|---|---|---|---|
| 1 | "Chandanathottililla" | S. Janaki | Sreekumaran Thampi | |
| 2 | "Chempavizhachundil" | P. Jayachandran | Sreekumaran Thampi | |
| 3 | "Ee Maruboovil" (Chandanathottililla [Bit] ) | S. Janaki | Sreekumaran Thampi | |
| 4 | "Etho Raavil" | S. Janaki | Sreekumaran Thampi | |
| 5 | "Kaneerilalle Jananam" | Kamukara | Sreekumaran Thampi | |
| 6 | "Kaneerilalle Jananam" (Bit) | Kamukara | Sreekumaran Thampi | |
| 7 | "Nin Padangalil" | P. Jayachandran, T. R. Omana | Sreekumaran Thampi | |
