= Basera E Tabassum =

- Formation: 12 May 2002
- Founder: Adhik Kadam, Bharti Mamani, Zahoor Sheikh, Mohiuddin Mir
- Type: Shelter Home
- Headquarters: Beerwah, Jammu and Kashmir
- Region served: India
- Services: Girls Education, Health Care, Mental Health, Women Empowerment
- Owner: Borderless World Foundation
- Founder Director: Adhik Kadam
- President: Shahnawaz Sheikh Zahoor
- Chief Operating Officer: Salima Bhat
- Mentor: Nitin Upadhye
- Staff: 26
- Volunteers: 200+
- Website: www.borderlessworldfoundation.org

Basera E Tabassum ("BeT") is an Indian girls' shelter. It was started in 2002 for girls who lost their parents as a result of armed conflict or terrorism during the ongoing Kashmir conflict. The mission of BeT is "To provide a secure home to the girls in the armed conflict".

At the time of BeT's founding, no girls' shelters were available in this area. BeT is the first project launched in the Kupwara district, which is badly affected by militancy.

== History ==
BeT was started by Borderless World Foundation, led by Bharti Mamani, Mohiuddin Mir, Bipin Takwale, Zahoor Sheikh and Adhik Kadam in Kupwara district.

As of 2016, over 5 BeT Homes operate across Jammu and Kashmir.

== Programs ==
BeT works mainly with girls who are unable to live normal, secure lives due to the loss of parents in the militancy. BeT provides shelter to the girls and cares for their health, education and mental health. More than 200 girls occupy the 5 homes. The shelters are located in Kupwara district, Anantnag district, Budgam district, Srinagar district, and Jammu district. BeT is supported by Asha for Education, National Securities Depository Limited and HDFC Bank, GTL Ltd.

BeT organizes national-level education exposure tours for better understanding of various cultures and educational methods. BeT also provides the girls with training and workshops. Local schools help BeT girls with admissions and regular classes. Colleagues and Kashmri University students join block field work courses via their undergraduate programs. Students of Tata Institute of Social Sciences, Nirmala Niketan, University of Pune, and University of Delhi send social work students to participate in field work as per the requirements of their master's degree. Under Education Exposure Tours, children visit cities such as Mumbai, Pune, Delhi, Nasik, Kolhapur, Chennai, and Hyderabad. Tata Institute of Social Sciences, Motiwala Education and Welfare Trust.

== Visits and recognition ==
Children of BeT pursue higher education in cities including Pune, Chennai, Nasik, and Kolhapur, especially in Law, Engineering and Medicine. Many younger girls take courses in computerized embroidery, making sanitary napkins, stitching, knitting, and various computer courses. Some girls are recognized as upcoming business entrepreneurs. Furthermore, in photography, girls won national awards. Prominent personalities including Shahu Maharaj Kolhapur State, Syed Ata Hasnain and the Holkar Dynasty have sponsored the initiative.
