= Sundaram Natarajan =

Indian ophthalmologist (born 1957)

Dr. Sundaram Natarajan
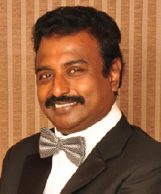
- Born: 4 September 1957 (age 68); Madurai, Madras State (now Tamil Nadu), India
- Education: Madras Medical College, Sankara Nethralaya
- Occupation: Ophthalmologist
- Awards: Padma Shri (2013)
- Website: www.adityajyoteyehospital.org

Sundaram Natarajan is an Indian ophthalmologist. In 2002, he started a free clinic in Dharavi, a slum in Mumbai, and treated more than 8,000 people. He has also held free camps in various other suburbs of Mumbai such as Mankhurd and Govandi to treat the economically poor. In 2016, he also held a camp in Kashmir to operate and cure the victims of pellet gun firings.

In 2013, he was awarded with Padma Shri, India's fourth highest civilian honour. As of January 2019, he is head of the Aditya Jyot Eye Hospital in Wadala, Mumbai.

== Education ==
Natarajan graduated from the Madras Medical College in 1980. He completed his Diploma in Ophthalmology (D.O) at the University of Madras in 1984 and Fellowship in Retina and Vitreous Surgery (F.R.V.S) at Sankara Nethralaya in 1985.

He completed Fellow of All India Collegium of Ophthalmology (FAICO) in 2012, Fellowship of the Royal Colleges of Surgeons (FRCS) in Glasgow in 2018, and Fellow of European Latino American Society of Ophthalmology (FELAS) in 2019.

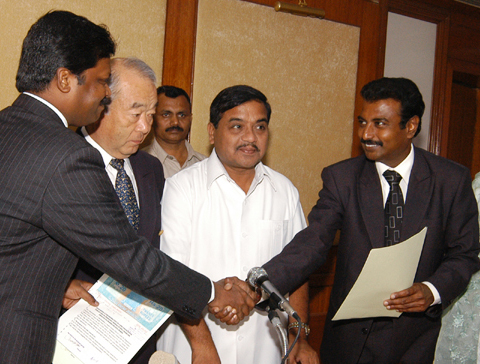
Dr.Natarajan with Deputy Chief Minister Mr. R.R.Patil and Mr. Hyosuke Yasui, Consul General of Japan in Mumbai, Feb, 2006

== Awards and records ==
He was awarded Padma Shri, one of India's highest civilian awards, by President of India Shri Pranab Mukherjee in 2013.

He holds a former Guinness World Record for the most diabetic eye screenings in 8 hours. This record was achieved when 649 diabetes patients were screened in Dharavi, Mumbai.

He is a "Character Inductee" of the Retina Hall of Fame, being one of two Indians listed in 2017.

He was awarded a State Award for Meritorious Service by the Government of Jammu and Kashmir for creating a record by performing forty-seven vitreoretinal surgeries in two and a half days while in Jammu and Kashmir.

He holds a National Record in the Limca Book of Records for performing the first completely sutureless sclera bucking as well as a sutureless 23G vitrectomy.

== Organizational awards ==
Year	Award	Organization(s)
1991	Dr. E. Balakrishnan Memorial Award	Indian Association of Biomedical Scientists, Madras
1995	Dr. V. K. Chitnis Oration	Maharashtra Ophthalmological Society
1998	Dr. Joseph Gnanadickam Gold Medal Oration Award	SROC and TNOA
1998	Best Researcher Award	Dr. P Siva Reddy Endowment fund, A.P. Akademi of Sciences
1998	C.N. Shroff Award	AIOC, Cochin
2001	Senior Honour Award	Vitreous Society, USA
2001	Best Video and Poster Award	APAO, Taiwan
2005	Innovation Award	Maharashtra Ophthalmological Society
2005	Man of the Millennium (Ophthalmology)	International Award Committee of Wisitex Foundation
2005	Dr. Rustom Ranji Oration	29th AP Ophthalmological Society
2005	Lifetime Achievement Award	National & International Compendium, New Delhi
2005	Gusi Peace Prize	Gusi Peace Prize Foundation, Manila
2006	Man of the Year	American Biographical Institute
2006	Young Achiever Award	ICON
2006	Distinguished Service	Asia Pacific Academy of Ophthalmology
2009	Lions Favourite Eye Specialist	Lions Club of Mumbai
2009	SSM Oration Award	SSM Eye Research Foundation, Cochin
2009	Achievement Award	American Academy of Ophthalmology
2010	Dr. Sandeep Wagh Award	
2010	Anita Oration Award	
2011	Air Marshal MS Bopari Award	Ocular Trauma Society of India
2011	Retina Oration Award 2011	SAARC Academy of Ophthalmology
2011	Gold Medal	Indian Intraocular Implant & Refractive Society, Delhi
2011	Gold Medal	Bombay Ophthalmologists’ Association, Mumbai
2011	Retina Foundation Oration Award	Retina Foundation, Ahmedabad
2012	Achievement Award	Asia Pacific Academy of Ophthalmology
2018	Senior Achievement Award	American Academy of Ophthalmology
2018	SAO Excellence Award	SAARC Academy of Ophthalmology, Nepal
2018	Prof. B.P.Kashyap Oration Award	Jharkhand Ophthalmological Society (JHOS)
2019	The Legends Of Indian Ophthalmology Award	iBeach Film Festival, GOA
2019	Dr. Dhanwant Singh Oration Award	Punjab Ophthalmological Society, Punjab

== Current academic positions ==
- President - Organized Medicine Academic Guild (OMAG)
- Managing Trustee - Aditya Jyot Foundation for Twinkling Little Eyes
- Managing Trustee - Aditya Jyot Research Foundation
- Secretary - Aditya Jyot Eye Research Institute
- Chairman - All India Ophthalmological Society (AIOS) Nationwide DR Screening Task Force
- Chairman of the International Committee - All India Ophthalmological Society
- Secretary General - Global Eye Genetics Consortium (GEGC)
- Immediate Past President - International Ocular Trauma Society
- Immediate Past President - Ocular Trauma Society of India (OTSI)
- Representative of AIOS ICO General Assembly
- ICO Board of Trustees International Council of Ophthalmology
- President - Asia Pacific Ophthalmic Trauma Society (APOTS)
- Member - Euretina International Advisory Board
- Hon. President - Sankara Nethralaya Alumni Association
- Regional Managing Editor - Eye World Asia Pacific, Indian Edition
- Honorary Director - Indian Eye Injury Registry
- Member - Council of Asia Pacific Intraocular Implant Association, Singapore
- Executive committee member - International Society of Ocular Trauma
- Hon. Secretary, Alumni Association- Sankara Nethralaya
- Vice President - Indo-Japanese Ophthalmic Foundation
- Patron - National Society for Prevention of Blindness, Mumbai Branch
