= Makkal Kural =

Indian newspaper

Makkal Kural is a Tamil daily newspaper, started in 1973 by M Shanmugavel.

This evening paper was famous for its explosive stand against Dravida Munnetra Kazhagam (DMK) rule in Tamil Nadu at that time. The firebrand editorials of Shanmugavel and T. R. Ramaswamy were historic at that time. On seeing the popularity of this newspaper M. G. Ramachandran (who had launched his own political party All India Anna Dravida Munnetra Kazhagam (AIADMK) to cross swords with DMK) patronised Makkal Kural and that led to the popularity of this newspaper in every village in Tamil Nadu.

Makkal Kural was the first in South India to install computerised DTP in the late 1980s.

In 1995 this group also started an English language evening paper, the Trinity Mirror.
