= Ramachandran =

The Tamil and Malayali name Ramachandran may refer to:

- A. Ramachandran (1935–2024), an Indian painter
- A. Ramachandran (politician) the incumbent mayor of Salem, Tamil Nadu
- C. R. Ramachandran, an Indian politician
- G. Ramachandran (1904–1995), an Indian social reformer and politician
- Gopalasamudram Narayana Iyer Ramachandran (1922–2001), an Indian biophysicist known for creating the Ramachandran plot
- K. V. Ramachandran (1898–1956), an Indian music and art critic
- M. Ramachandran, an Indian politician
- M. D. R. Ramachandran (1934–2024), an Indian politician
- M. G. Ramachandran, also known as MGR (1917–1987), an Indian film actor and former Chief Minister of Tamil Nadu
- N. S. Ramachandran (born 1908 (?)), an Indian composer of Carnatic music
- P. P. Ramachandran, an Indian poet
- R. Ramachandran (poet), an Indian poet
- Subramaniam Ramachandran, a missing Sri Lankan journalist
- T. Ramachandran (CPI politician), an Indian politician
- T. Ramachandran (INC politician), an Indian politician
- T. Ramachandran (writer) (1944–2000), an Indian author
- T. A. Ramachandran (1912–1951), an Indian cricket umpire
- T. K. Ramachandran (died 1993), an Indian film actor and producer
- T. N. Ramachandran (1903–1973), an Indian art historian, artist, archaeologist, and Sanskrit scholar
- T. R. Ramachandran (1917–1990), an Indian actor and comedian
- Thechikottukavu Ramachandran (born c. 1964), a controversial elephant
- V. S. Ramachandran (born 1951), an Indian-American neuroscientist
- Asogan Ramesh Ramachandren (c. 1973–1998), a Singaporean convicted murderer

== First name ==
- Ramachandran Ramesh (born 1976), an Indian chess grandmaster
- N. Ramachandran Gingee (born 1944), an Indian politician
- S. Ramachandran Pillai (born 1938), an Indian politician

== See also ==
- Ramachandran plot, a biochemical method
- Ramachandra, a deity of Hinduism
