= K. Govindaswamy Naidu =

Indian industrialist and philanthropist (1907–1995)

K. Govindasamy Naidu
- Born: K. Govindaswamy; 12 July 1907; Annur, Coimbatore district, Tamil Nadu
- Died: 28 January 1995 (aged 87)
- Occupation: entrepreneur

K Govindaswamy Naidu (12 July 1907 – 28 January 1995), popularly known as KG, was an industrialist and philanthropist from Coimbatore, Tamil Nadu, India.

== Early life ==
Govindaswamy was born in a telugu family in Coimbatore. He had very little formal education and worked with his father who was a highway contractor. He started his own business before he was twenty years old, after gaining experience in a grocery shop as an assistant.

== Career ==
In 1932, Govindaswamy started his first ginning factory. His further industrial ventures included cotton ginning and spinning, weaving denim, manufacturing terry towels, casting, manufacture of waterpumps and entertainment with an asset base of Rs.2 billion and sales of Rs. 3 billion, of which more than 25% came from exports. He adopted modern technology to revive sick units and to create employment in rural areas, he located all his factories in villages, away from the urban areas with a larger proportion of women.

Govindasamy donated money to religious, educational, medical and social causes. He established multiple schools, a hospital with 550 beds and many temples.

== Honors ==
Saravanampatti Adheenam bestowed the title Annadhana Vallal on him. Sri Abhinava Vidyatirtha of Sri Sharada Peetham, Sringeri, bestowed the title Dharmaveera on KG for his contributions to religious activities, including the funding and construction of the Sharadambal temple in 1979 at Race Course, Coimbatore.

The Department of Posts, part of the Ministry of Communications and Information Technology, Government of India, released a special postal cover of Govindaswamy in commemoration of the centenary celebrations on 18 July 2009.
