= Jaya Mahesh =

Indian model (born 1969)

- Born: 14 February 1969 (age 57); Coimbatore, Tamil Nadu, India
- Education: Bachelor of Commerce
- Occupations: Fitness Therapist, Fashion Model
- Years active: 1996–present
- Website: www.drjayamahesh.com/home.html

Jayashree Chandramohan popularly known as Jaya Mahesh is an Indian pageant winner, model and fitness therapist. She was born into a Tamil family in South Indian city Coimbatore. She was a homemaker before overcoming her post-pregnancy health issues and starting her career.

== Background and family ==
Jaya Mahesh was born in Coimbatore, Tamil Nadu, India into a Tamil family. She did her schooling at GRG Matriculation Higher Secondary School in Coimbatore. She went on to graduate in B.Com from PSGR Krishnammal College in Coimbatore. She is married to Mahesh Kumar G a business professional in the year 1995 and has one daughter Sanjana M Kumar.

== Career ==
Jaya Mahesh was suffering from Post Pregnancy trauma and abnormal weight gain. She gained over 118 kilograms (260 lb) after her pregnancy. She also lost her eyesight due to her abnormal weight gain.

She overcame her personal struggles with support from her husband and children - as she quotes, she framed her own routines of food and exercise habits.

Jaya Mahesh had her first big success and recognition when she was crowned Mrs. Coimbatore in the year 2006. She went on to win and crowned as Mrs. India Earth Classic in the year 2016.

Jaya Mahesh was recently adjudged the third runner up at Mrs Globe Classic event in California. She also bagged the Mrs. Photogenic crown.

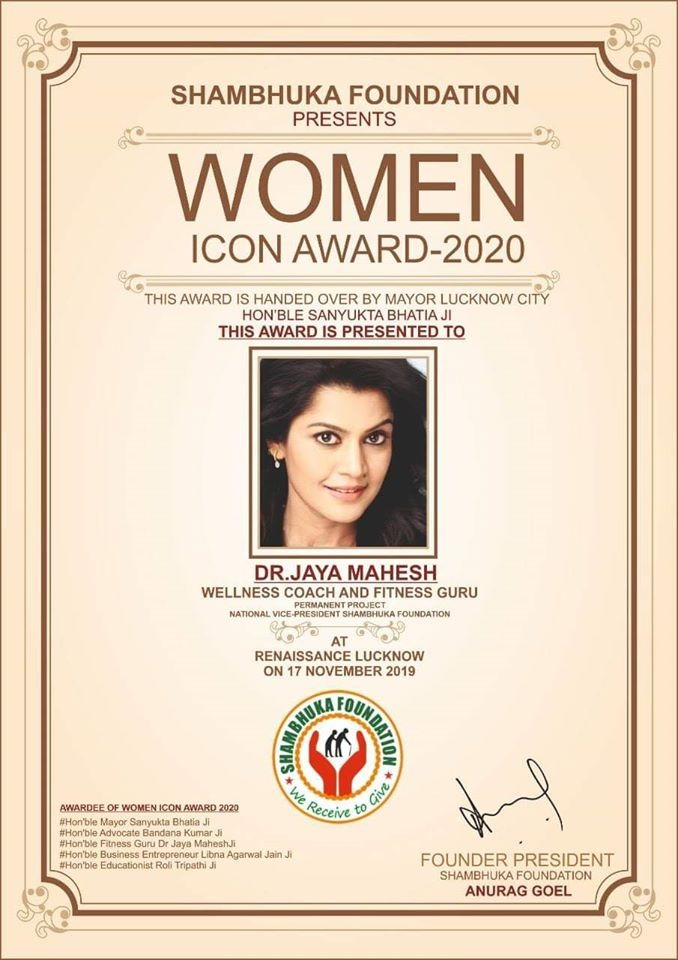
Vice President of Shambhuka Foundation

== Awards and recognition ==
Year	Award	Category	Title
2006	Mrs. Coimbatore	Fashion	Mrs. Coimbatore
2016	Mrs. India	Fashion	Mrs. India Earth Classic
2018	Mrs. Photogenic	Fashion	Mrs. Globe Classic
2019	Icon of Coimbatore	Fitness	Icon of Coimbatore
2019	Kovai Wonder Women 2K19	Fitness	Kovi Wonder Women iCON
