= Mother Teresa Awards =

Awards for promoters of peace and social justice

The Mother Teresa Awards, officially called the Mother Teresa Memorial Awards for Social Justice, are international and national awards presented annually to honour individuals and organizations that promote peace, equality and social justice, and aim to encourage the cause of justice and peaceful coexistence, while providing an impetus for society to imbibe these values. The awards are given in honour of Mother Teresa.

== History and structure ==
Mother Teresa Awards have been given since 2005 annually or biannually. The awards are an initiative of Harmony Foundation, a non-profit organization founded by Dr.Abraham Mathai in Mumbai. It is the only award in the name of Mother Teresa reviewed and recognized by Sister Prema, Superior General of Missionaries of Charity.

The awards are reviewed by a board of patrons that comprises Dr. Abraham Mathai — Founder Chairman and former Vice-Chairman of National Commission for Minorities, Baroness Caroline Cox — member and former deputy chairperson of House of Lords, Mahesh Bhatt — filmmaker, Tushar Gandhi — Great-grandson of Mahatma Gandhi, Flavia Agnes — women's rights activist, and Shazia Ilmi — Journalist and politician.

== Awardees ==
| Year | Recipients | Award type | Notes |
|---|---|---|---|
| 2005 | Caroline Cox; Kiran Bedi; M. A. Thomas; Lim Siow Jin; Rajanikant Arole; Mihir Desai; Susai Joseph; Christobel Fonseca; Oasis India | National Award | |
| 2006 | Mahathir Mohamad | International Award | |
| 2006 | Anna Hazare; Oscar Fernandes; Jesuits; Nitin Sardar; TCS; Dr. Farhan; Edwin Britto; Sudha Murty | National Award | |
| 2007 | no awards | | |
| 2008 | Ansar Burney | International Award | |
| 2008 | Kripa Foundation; Shri. Shailesh Gandhi; Shri. R. B. Sreekumar; The Leprosy Mission; The Times of India; Teen Challenge; Swami Agnivesh; John Dayal; Shri. Manikrao Thakare | National Award | |
| 2009 | no awards | | |
| 2010 | Dalai-Lama | International Award | |
| 2010 | Sayed Iqbal Haider; Sewa- Ashram; Udit Raj; Aruna Roy and MKSS; Shri Colin Gonsalves; Smt. Sumaira Abdulali; Adhik Kadam; Borderless World Foundation; Yogesh Pratap Singh; AADS Education | National Award | |
| 2011 | [[]] | | |
| 2012 | Sima Samar; Malala Yousafzai | International Award | |
| 2012 | Mukti Mission; Kuldip Nayar; NDTV-Coca-Cola India Support My School; Campaign Impact; Vinay Shetty; Indian Cancer Society; Flavia Agnes; Shillong Chamber Choir | National Award | |
| 2013 | Sam Childers | International Award | |
| 2013 | Cedric Prakash; Indian Rescue Mission; Sindhutai Sapkal; Diep Saeeda; Hanumappa Sudarshan; Arunachalam Muruganantham; Sushmita Sen; Maulana Mahmood Madani | National Award | |
| 2014 | Anuradha Koirala | International Award | |
| 2014 | Prakash Amte; Sangthankima; Medha Patkar; Sunitha Krishnan; Ujjwal Uke; Lakshmidhar Mishra; Udaan (2014 TV series); Medha Patkar; Vandana Shiva; Rifat Abdullah | National Award | |
| 2015 | Bilquis Bano; Médecins Sans Frontières; Gladys Staines | International Award | |
| 2015 | Abhay and Rani Bang; Harakchand Savla; Rural Healthcare Foundation; Narayanan Krishnan; Nandakumar and Shylaja Menon; Thomas Auto Raja; Rahul Baura (South Asia Foundation) | National Award | |
| 2016 | Nana Akufo-Addo; Abdullah Bin Zayed Al Nahyan; Late Faraaz Ayaaz Hossain; White Helmets (Syrian Civil Defense) | International Award | |
| 2016 | Selene Biffi; Dr. Zeenat Shaukat Ali; Karambir Singh Kang; Maninderjeet Singh Bitta; Late Neerja Bhanot | National Award | |
| 2017 | UNHCR; Shigeru Ban | International Award | |
| 2017 | Fr. Tom Uzhunnalil; The A21 Campaign; Hellenic Rescue Team; Priyanka Chopra; Mercy Corp; Khalsa Aid; Caritas Internationalis; Bayat Foundation; Zakat Foundation of India; IsraAID | National Award | |
| 2018 | Women for Afghan Women; Dr. Oby Ezekwesili; Idress Bashar Silo; Laila Talo Khuder Alali; Salman Sufi; Shahida Akter; Tawakkol Karman | International Award | |
| 2018 | Barefoot College; Adv. Deepika Singh Rajawat; Kiran Mazumdar; Laxmi Agarwal; Sister Lucy Kurien; Suhani Jalota | National Award | |
| 2019 | Kailash Satyarthi; Prerana; Ajeet Singh; Hasina Kharbhih; Kiran Kamal Prasad; Alezandra Russell; Evelien Holsken; Rob Williams; DAFOH; Office for the Rescue of Yazidi; Junior Nzita Nsuami | International Award | |
