= Myna Mahila Foundation =

Indian non-profit women's health and empowerment organization

- Founded: August 2015
- Founder: Suhani Jalota
- Type: Non-governmental organization
- Legal status: Active
- Headquarters: Govandi, Mumbai, India
- Location: Mumbai, India
- Website: mynamahila.com

The Myna Mahila Foundation (MMF) is an Indian non-governmental organization based in Mumbai that works on women's health, menstrual hygiene, employment and economic empowerment. It was founded in 2015 by Suhani Jalota while she was studying at Duke University.

The foundation's work has included encouraging open discussion of taboo subjects such as menstruation, producing and distributing low-cost sanitary products, conducting health and hygiene education, and providing employment and vocational training opportunities to women in low-income communities.

The foundation's name refers to the Myna bird, which is known for its vocal behaviour, together with mahila, the Hindi word for "woman".

== History ==
=== Founding and early work ===
Myna Mahila was founded in 2015 by Jalota while she was an undergraduate at Duke University. Jalota became involved in public-health work in low-income communities in Mumbai and identified menstrual hygiene and employment opportunities as areas where women faced significant barriers.

The organization initially trained women living in Mumbai's urban slums to manufacture and sell low-cost sanitary napkins within their communities. The employment programme was combined with health and hygiene education intended to encourage discussion of menstruation and reduce the stigma surrounding it.

By 2018, the organization employed approximately 35 women, including women involved in manufacturing and sales, and reported approximately 3,000 customers.

=== Royal wedding and international attention ===
The organization attracted international attention through its association with Meghan Markle. In 2017, Markle visited Myna Mahila during a trip to India with World Vision. Markle subsequently wrote about menstrual stigma and the foundation in Time magazine in an article titled "How Periods Affect Potential".

In the same year, Markle included Jalota in her Glamour article "The Ten Women Who Changed My Life".

In April 2018, Prince Harry and Markle selected Myna Mahila as one of seven charities to receive donations in lieu of wedding gifts from members of the public. The couple married on 19 May 2018.

The attention surrounding the royal wedding increased the organization's international profile and was reported by Indian and international media as an opportunity for the foundation to expand its work in Mumbai's urban communities.

== Programs and activities ==
=== Menstrual health ===
A central part of Myna Mahila's work has been menstrual-health education and access to affordable sanitary products. The foundation has trained women from low-income communities to manufacture and sell sanitary napkins within their neighbourhoods, combining income generation with improved access to menstrual products.

The organization also conducts workshops and community discussions intended to encourage open conversations about menstruation and challenge social taboos surrounding periods.

=== Women's employment and vocational training ===
Myna Mahila's initial sanitary-pad programme was designed as both a menstrual-health intervention and an employment opportunity. Women were trained to manufacture the products and sell them within their communities.

The foundation has also provided training in areas including women's health, English, mathematics and life skills such as self-defence.

Its activities have subsequently broadened beyond sanitary-product production to other forms of vocational and livelihood training.

=== Education and women's empowerment ===
The foundation has developed programmes intended to support women and girls beyond menstrual health. These have included women's health workshops, vocational training and educational initiatives for girls from low-income communities.

One such initiative has been a "Sponsor a Girl" scholarship programme supporting girls' education.

=== Research and technology ===
Myna Mahila has also developed a research-oriented component to its work, examining women's health, sanitation, employment and livelihoods in low-income communities.

Its more recent work has included technology-based approaches to women's health and employment, including digital employment initiatives and health-information tools. These programmes have sought to use mobile technology to provide flexible income opportunities and improve access to health information.

== Organization and structure ==
Myna Mahila operates as a nonprofit organization in Mumbai, with its work historically concentrated in urban communities including Govandi.

The organization was founded by Suhani Jalota, who led its early development while studying at Duke University. Its programmes have relied substantially on women from the communities in which it operates, particularly for the production and sale of sanitary products and community outreach.

Publicly available information on the organization's current executive structure, staffing levels, board composition and finances is limited.

== Impact and recognition ==
Myna Mahila has received substantial media attention for its work on menstrual health and women's employment. In 2016, its founder Suhani Jalota was named one of Glamour magazine's College Women of the Year.

The foundation's association with Meghan Markle and its selection as a beneficiary of donations connected with the 2018 royal wedding brought additional international attention to its work.

The foundation has subsequently been featured in coverage of women's health, menstrual hygiene, social entrepreneurship and technology-based interventions in low-income communities.

== See also ==
- Suhani Jalota
- Menstrual hygiene
- Women's health
- Women in India
- Female labour force participation
