= G. Bakthavathsalam =

Indian surgeon (born 1942)

- Born: Govindaswamy Bakthavathsalam; 5 April 1942 (age 84); Annur, Coimbatore district, Madras Presidency, British Raj
- Education: Madras Medical College
- Children: 2
- Awards: Padma Shri (2005); Dr. B. C. Roy Award; Dharmaveera Award; Lifetime Achievement Award; Jewel of Coimbatore
- Website: www.kghospital.com

Govindaswamy Bakthavathsalam (born 5 April 1942), also known as G. Bakthavathsalam, is an Indian surgeon, chairman, and managing trustee of the Dharmaveera K. Govindaswamy Naidu Medical Trust, which operates the K. G. Hospital in Coimbatore, India.

== Early life and education ==
Govindaswamy Bakthavathsalam, also known as Dr. Beta, was born on 5 April 1942 in Annur, Coimbatore district. In 1964, he graduated with a Master of Science degree and an MBBS from Madras Medical College. He completed his postgraduate training in surgery at Mount Sinai Hospital in Chicago, Illinois.

== Career ==
He helped expand the KG Hospital under his leadership.

== Accolades ==
In 1984, he received the Dr. B. C. Roy Award from Prime Minister Rajiv Gandhi.

In 2005, he received the Padma Shri for his work in medicine from then-President of India A. P. J. Abdul Kalam. That year, he was one of six honored with a "Personality of the Decade" award from KG Foundation.

In 2009, he received a D.Sc. (Honoris Cause) from MGR Medical University.
