= Suhani Jalota =

Indian economist and social entrepreneur

- Born: Mumbai, India
- Known for: Founder of the Myna Mahila Foundation
- Awards: Glamour Woman of the Year (2016); Queen's Young Leader (2017); Forbes Asia 30 Under 30 (2018)

Academic background
- Education: Duke University; Stanford University

Academic work
- Discipline: Economics, public health, women's empowerment
- Institutions: Stanford University

Suhani Jalota is an Indian economist, researcher and social entrepreneur known for her work on women's health, employment and economic development in India. She is the founder of the Myna Mahila Foundation, a Mumbai-based social enterprise working on women's health, employment and empowerment.

Jalota graduated from Duke University in 2016 with a degree in Economics and Global Health. She subsequently pursued graduate studies at Stanford University, where she undertook an M.B.A. at the Stanford Graduate School of Business and a Ph.D. in Health Policy and Economics. She has also been associated with the Hoover Institution at Stanford, where her research has focused on women's workforce participation, economic development and technology-enabled interventions.

Jalota received Glamour magazine's College Women of the Year grand prize in 2016. In 2017, she received the Queen's Young Leaders Award for her work with Myna Mahila.

== Early life and education ==
Jalota was raised in Mumbai, India. While studying at Duke University, she became involved in public health work among women in low-income communities in Mumbai. She graduated from Duke in 2016 with a degree in Economics and Global Health.

In 2018, Jalota enrolled at Stanford University as a Knight-Hennessy Scholar. She pursued concurrent graduate studies, including an M.B.A. at the Stanford Graduate School of Business and a Ph.D. in Health Policy at the Stanford School of Medicine. During her time at Stanford, she participated in entrepreneurship and research programmes and continued her work on women's employment and health.

== Career ==
=== Myna Mahila Foundation ===
In 2015, while still an undergraduate at Duke, Jalota founded the Myna Mahila Foundation in Mumbai. The organisation initially focused on menstrual hygiene and employment opportunities for women in low-income communities.

Myna Mahila began by training women to produce and distribute low-cost sanitary pads while providing menstrual-health education in their communities. The organisation subsequently expanded its activities to include women's health, employment, vocational training and research.

The foundation established women's empowerment hubs in urban communities, where it conducted health workshops and vocational programmes. It also developed initiatives including a Sponsor a Girl scholarship programme aimed at supporting girls' education.

Jalota also established Myna Research as a research and data-collection arm of the organisation. Its work has included surveys and field studies concerning women's health, sanitation, employment and livelihoods in low-income communities.

Myna Mahila received international attention following Jalota's recognition by Glamour and her subsequent association with Meghan Markle. In 2017, Markle visited Myna Mahila during a visit to Mumbai. In 2018, Myna Mahila was selected as one of the charities to receive donations in lieu of gifts for the wedding of Prince Harry and Meghan Markle. It was reported as the only non-UK-based organisation among the seven charities selected.

Following the royal wedding campaign, Myna Mahila announced plans to expand the number of women reached through its programmes.

=== Digital employment and RANI ===
While pursuing graduate studies at Stanford, Jalota developed additional work focused on women's participation in the labour market. She founded Rani Jobs, also referred to as RANI, a digital employment platform intended to provide flexible work opportunities to women in low-income communities.

The platform uses smartphone-based microtasks to connect women with short-term digital work, including tasks associated with data labelling and other forms of digital labour. The initiative was developed in response to research into barriers to women's participation in India's formal labour market and sought to provide work that could be performed flexibly from home or community-based job hubs.

RANI subsequently operated in partnership with private-sector and nonprofit organisations. Its projects included employment and technology pilots involving women in Mumbai.

=== Academic and research work ===
Jalota's academic and research work has focused on women's employment, economic development, public health and technology. Her research has examined constraints on women's participation in paid employment and interventions intended to increase women's access to economic opportunities.

At Stanford, she was associated with the Hoover Institution and conducted research involving field experiments in economic development. Her doctoral research examined barriers to women's paid employment in India and evaluated technology-enabled approaches, including digital employment and health interventions.

Her research and public work have included women's health, employment, agent training and digital health technologies. She has also worked on initiatives examining the future of work for women and the use of technology to increase women's economic participation.

Jalota has spoken publicly about women's employment, menstrual health and gender inequality in India through interviews, public talks and TEDx events.

== Awards and honors ==
Awards and recognitions
Year	Award	Organization	Result
2016	Glamour College Women of the Year	Glamour	Winner
2017	Queen's Young Leaders Award	Queen's Young Leaders Programme	Recipient
2018	Forbes Asia 30 Under 30 (Social Entrepreneurs)	Forbes Asia	Honoree
2018	Mother Teresa Memorial Award	Harmony Foundation	Recipient
2019	Asia 21 Young Leaders	Asia Society	Honoree
2020	Global Citizen Prize: Cisco Youth Leadership Award	Global Citizen	Nominee
2021	30 Under 30 (Business & Management)	Hindustan Times	Honoree
2022	Best & Brightest MBA	Poets&Quants	Honoree
2024	She Shapes AI	She's the First	Selected

Jalota has also received recognition for her work in women's health, employment and social entrepreneurship. In 2020, she was nominated for the Global Citizen Prize: Cisco Youth Leadership Award.

== Personal life ==
Jalota has primarily discussed her professional and academic work publicly. She has been based in the United States while continuing her research and entrepreneurship activities.

== See also ==
- Myna Mahila Foundation
- Women's health
- Women in India
- Female labour force participation
