= Annur =

Suburb of Coimbatore Tamil Nadu, India

- Town
- Location in Tamil Nadu, India
- Coordinates: 11.23°N 77.10°E
- Country: India
- State: Tamil Nadu
- Region: Kongu Nadu
- District: Coimbatore
- Metro: Coimbatore
- Elevation: 338 m (1,109 ft)

Population (2019)
  - Total: 29,200

Languages
  - Official: Tamil
- Time zone: UTC+5:30 (IST)
- PIN: 641653
- Telephone code: +91-4254
- Vehicle registration: TN 40

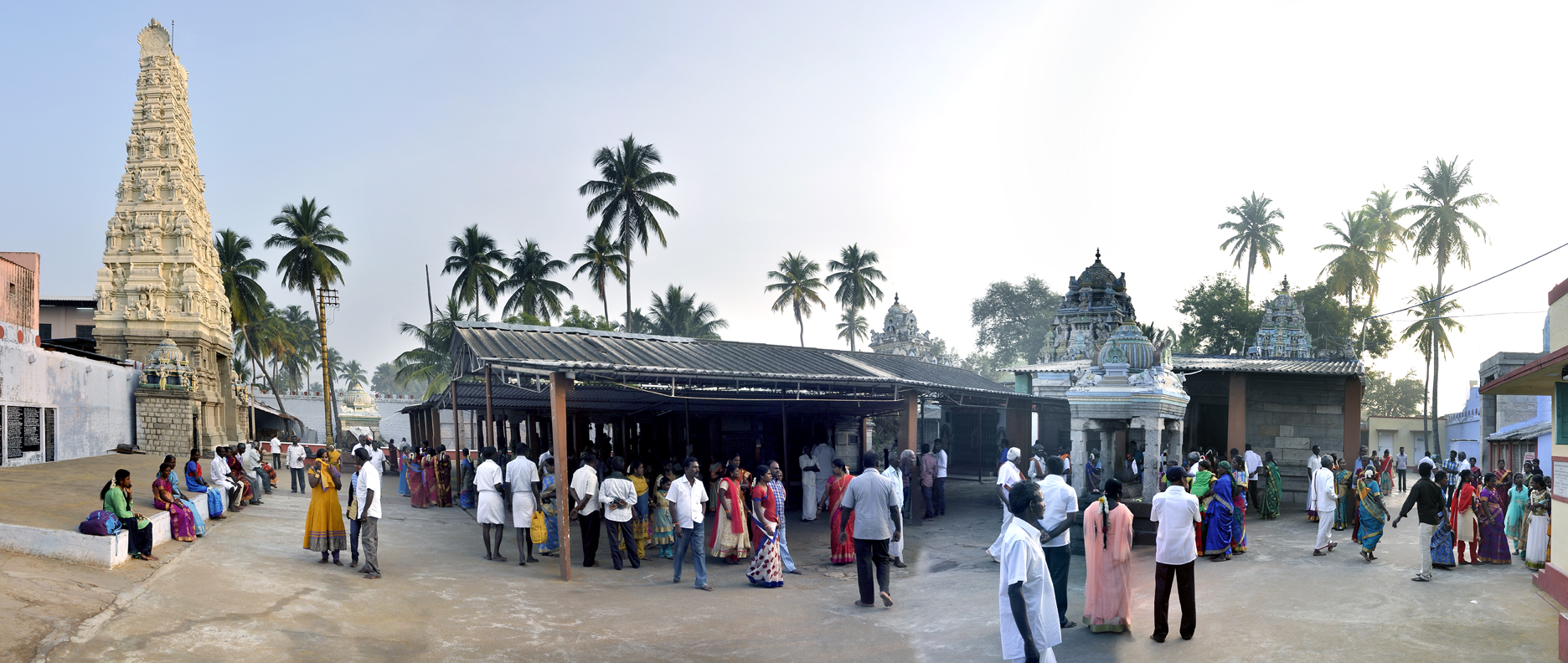
Panorama view of Sree Manneeshwarar Temple (Inner Side), Annur

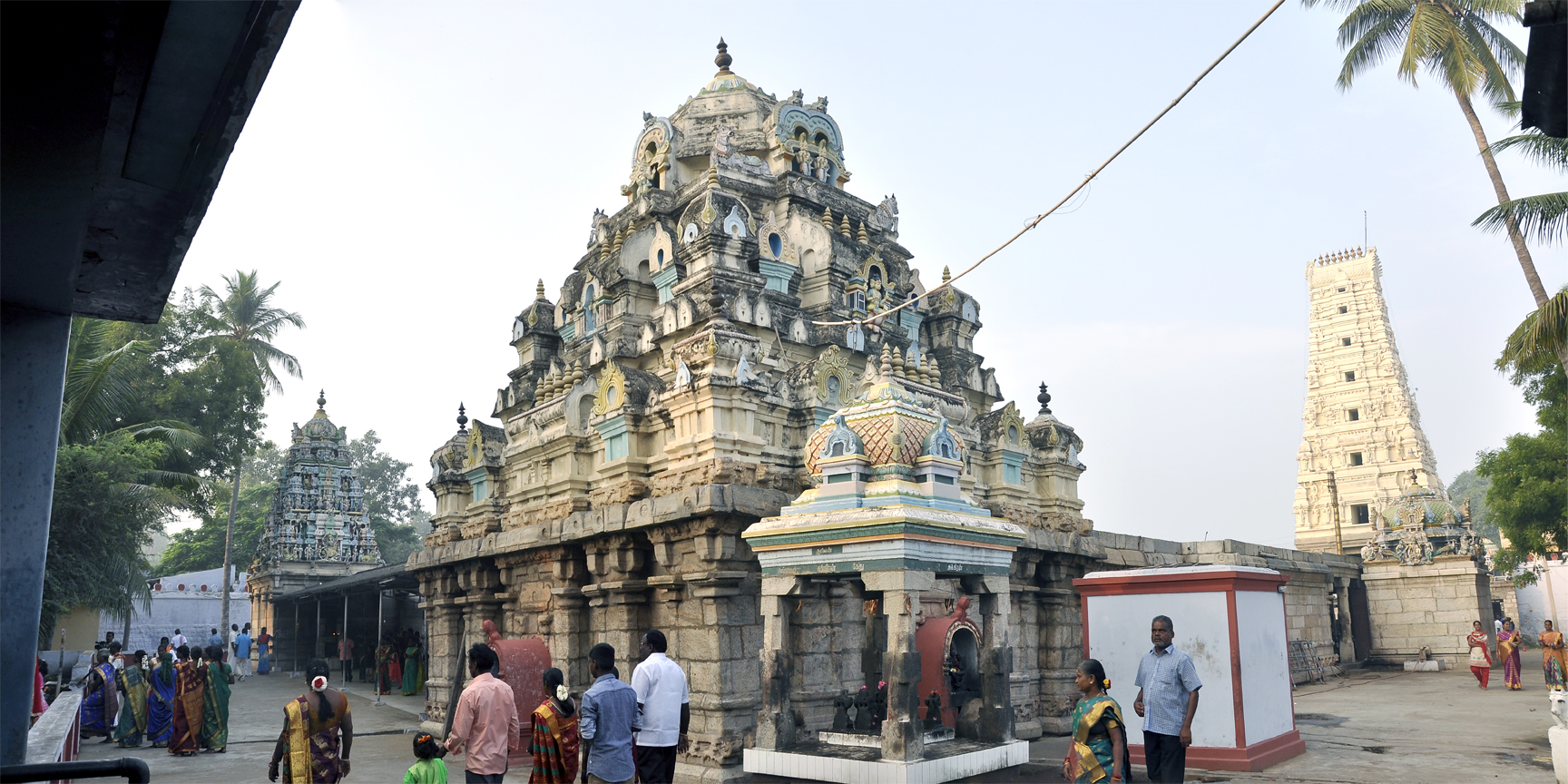
Panorama view of Sree Manneeshwarar Temple (Inner back side)Annur

Annur is a town Panchayat and Taluk headquarters of Annur Taluk of the Coimbatore district. It is a suburb of Coimbatore located north-east about 30 kilometres (19 miles) from the center of the city. The nearest airport is Coimbatore International Airport, which is about 27 kilometres (17 miles) away from Annur. The nearest railway station is Mettupalayam, which is about 21 kilometres (13 miles) away. Other cities/towns near Annur are Mettupalayam, which is 21 kilometres (13 miles) away in the west, Avanashi, which is 18 kilometres (11 miles) away in the east and Punjai Puliampatti, which is about 18 kilometres (11 miles) in the north. Annur has a police station in the Karumathampatti subdivision.

== Etymology ==
The name Annur is believed to have been come from "Vanniyur", later transformed to Anniyur and now to Annur. The myth behind the name says that, over 1000 years ago, when a small hunter hit a stone under a "Vanni" tree, it started bleeding. He was astonished and called the village people to look after this issue. Later they found a "Suyambu" Lord Shiva Idol there and built the Manneeshwarar temple.

== Economy ==
Bildon steel is manufactured from Annur. This famous steel is being exported to different parts of India and abroad. There are a large number of textile mills situated in the Annur region. Pioneers in setting up textile mills in the Annur region were the KG Group founded by K Govindaswamy Naidu also kown as KG. There are several educational institutions operational under KG group in Annur.

== Geography ==
Annur is located at 11.23°N 77.13°E. It has an average elevation of 338 metres (1108 feet). Annur is well connected by roads including the National Highway 209 (New NH948) (Coimbatore to Bangalore highway) and the State Highway 80 SH80 Avanashi to Mettupalayam passes through Annur.

== Demographics ==
According to 2011 census taken by the Government of India, Annur had a population of 20,079, of which, males constitute 9,971 and females constitute 10,108, giving it a lower sex ratio than the national average. Annur has a literacy rate of 80.93%, which is above the national average of 77.70%, as well as the state average of 80.09%.

== Trivia ==
The Gandhi Museum of Coimbatore is located in Sokkampalayam village in Annur. During the Indian independence movement, Mahatma Gandhi visited the village at the request of Bettaiyan, a resident of the village, and delivered a speech emphasising the need for grassroots level participation in the national movement, following which several villagers pledged their allegiance to the movement.
