= Sounthirajan Kumaraswamy =

Indian mechanical engineer

Sounthirajan Kumaraswamy is an Indian mechanical engineer from Coimbatore, Tamil Nadu who invented Super Sonic Hydrogen IC Engine, the first water-based engine that uses hydrogen as fuel and releases oxygen.
