= Vishnu Jejjala =

Indian-American physicist (born 1975)

Vishnumohan "Vishnu" Jejjala (born January 15, 1975) is an Indian-American physicist who specializes in string theory.

Jejjala was born in Coimbatore, India. His family moved to the United States in 1980. Jejjala earned Bachelor of Science degrees in physics, mathematics, and astronomy from University of Maryland at College Park in 1996. He earned a Master of Science and Ph.D. in physics in 2002 from University of Illinois at Urbana-Champaign. He did postdoctoral work at Virginia Tech from 2002 to 2004, Durham University from 2004 to 2007, and Institut des Hautes Études Scientifiques from 2007 to 2009. Since 2009, he has been at Queen Mary, University of London.
