= Motiwala Education and Welfare Trust =

Indian educational and welfare program

Motiwala Education and Welfare Trust is an educational and welfare program based in Nasik, India. The trust was founded in 1989 by Zubie Motiwala and her husband F. Motiwala. The foundation first began by providing medical help to the poor and soon expanded to colleges and schools.

== History ==
=== Motiwala Rural Homeopathic Medical Camps ===
From 1983 to 1989 the Rural Homeopathic Medical Camps provided homeopathic cure and aid in Talukas of Surgana, Dindori, Peth of Maharashtra and Gujarat. The trust is a Baháʼí Faith-inspired organization with focus on long term community building and social service, which the couple were involved in for the most of their adult life.

== Health institutions ==
=== Motiwala National Homeopathic Medical College ===
The college was founded by Dr. Farooq Motiwala and Dr. Afsaneh Motiwala. It is part of the Maharashtra University of Health Sciences. It is an accredited college and grants Bachelor of Homoeopathic Medical Sciences (BHMS).

=== Motiwala Memorial General Hospital ===
The Hospital was established in June 1991 and provides low-cost and free services to patients. It is located in the same arena of the College.

== Educational institution ==
=== Dawn Breakers High School ===
Dawn Breakers High School, originally named Dawn Breakers English Medium School was founded in 1992 by Rajendra Motiwala and is a K-12 Baháʼí-inspired high school named after The Dawn-Breakers historical text. It is located in Nasik, just kilometers away from the college and hospital. The motto of the school is "Morality before Materiality". Mr. Rajendra Motiwala is a Baháʼí and promotes equality, adores diversity and stresses on the betterment of the moral conduct of Faculty and Students in the school, in relation to the same regular moral lectures are also conducted with social service activities by the teachers. Limited number of students are accepted in every class and universal participation is encouraged.

=== Motiwala Educational Science College ===
The emphasis of the college is on environmental and humanitarian arenas. They bring students from all parts of the world so study together and find solutions in the respective field of study.

=== Priceless Pearl Scholars Academy ===
Priceless Pearl Scholars Academy was founded in 2002 and operates in Igatpuri. The school is regulated by ICSE Board since 2005.
