= R.V. Ramani =

Founder of Sankara Eye Foundation

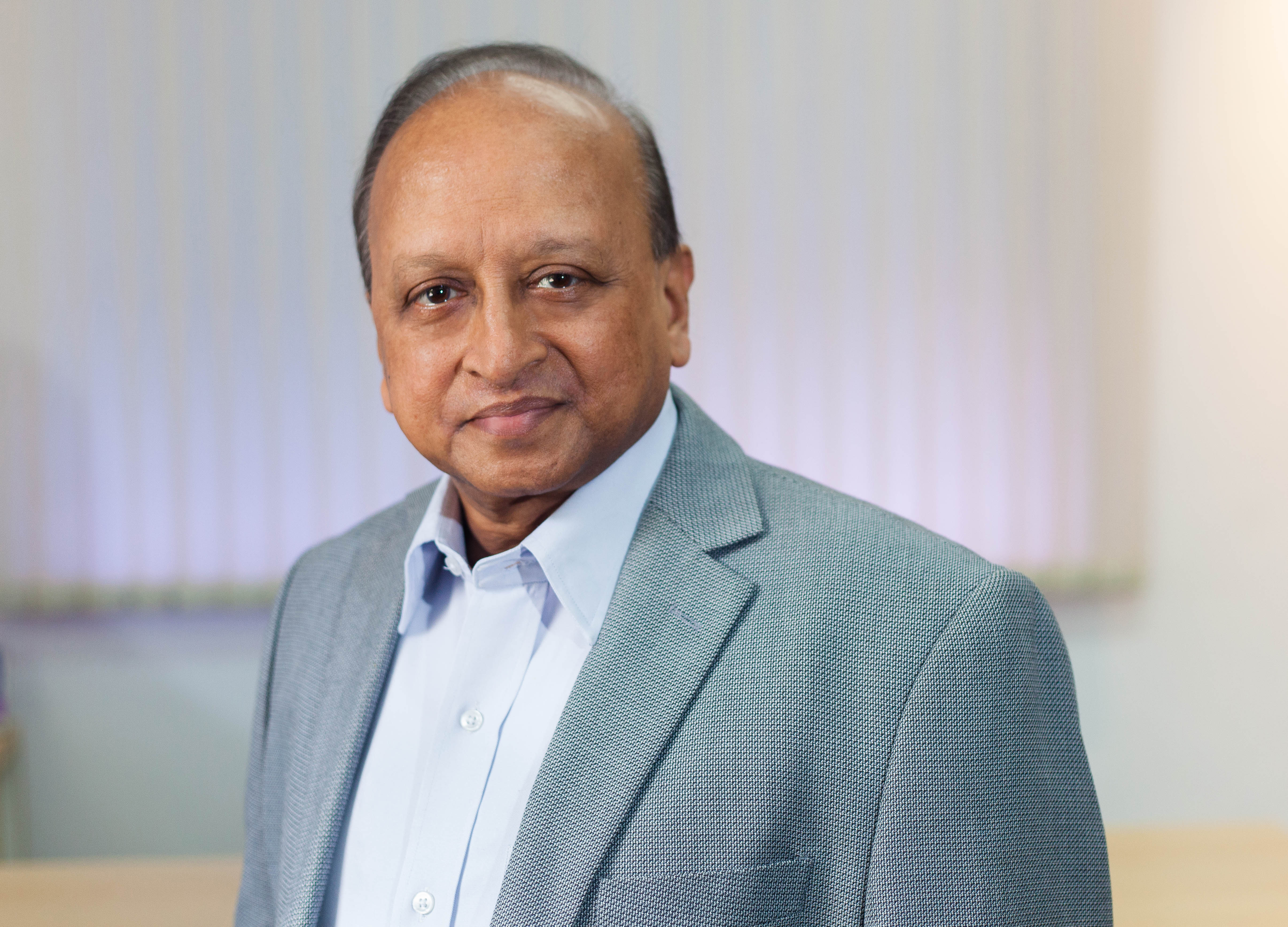
- Born: 24 July 1947 (age 79); British India
- Education: Municipal Boys High School, Coimbatore
- Alma mater: Kasturba Medical College, Mangalore
- Occupation: Doctor
- Title: Dr.
- Spouse: Radha Ramani
- Honours: Padma Shri

Dr. R. V. Ramani or Dr. RVR as he is popularly known, is the founder and the managing trustee of Sankara Eye Foundation (SEF). Sankara Eye Hospital is a unit of SEF. SEFI is a leading not-for-profit Institution in India working towards freedom from preventable and curable blindness. Dr. Ramani was awarded the prestigious Padmashri Award, third highest civilian award by Government of India in 2019.

== Early life and education ==
Dr. Ramani was born to Dr. A Ramanathan and Mrs. Lakshmi Ramanathan in Coimbatore, Tamil Nadu on July 24, 1947. Dr. A Ramanathan was one of the first Doctors of Coimbatore city and contributed significantly towards providing medical care to the populace during the 1942 Plague outbreak. The reverence people had for his father as a Doctor made a deep and lasting impression on young Ramani. Since his school years, Ramani was determined to take up Medicine as a profession and follow in his noble father's footsteps.

Dr. Ramani completed his high school education at Municipal Boys High School in Coimbatore. After high school, he went on to get his Medical Degree from Kasturba Medical College, Manipal where he was given the Best Outgoing Student award for meritorious performance.

== Personal life ==
Dr. Ramani lost his father while he was at the medical school in May 1966. Being the eldest son, he understood the responsibility of caring for his young siblings and his mother, widowed at the age of 40 only. Ramani married Dr. Radha in the year 1971. Dr. Ramani and Dr. Radha, blessed, inspired and guided by the Sankaracharyas of Kanchi, sought to bring light to the lives of people through quality eye care.

== Career ==
Early Years (1972–1977)

Dr. Ramani returned to Coimbatore from his medical college and together, he and Dr. Radha restarted Ramani's father's clinic under the name “Dr. Ramanathan Memorial Clinic”. Very soon, the couple became one of the top Family Doctors of the city with a rich client base.

The Divine Calling (1977–1985)

Despite a highly successful private medical practice, both Dr. Radha and Dr. Ramani had an urge to do something more to help those who could not afford quality health care. In 1977, a small Medical Center was established on the premises of the Kamakshi Amman Temple at R.S. Puram, Coimbatore with the Doctor couple and 10 other likeminded physicians and Medical Representatives as volunteers. During the next 5 years, 9 such centers were established with the involvement of leading Industrial Families of Coimbatore and the panel of Doctors slowly expanded and 75 Consultants from various specialties of Medicine joined the Group in an Honorary capacity.

Sri Kanchi Kamakoti Medical Trust (SKKMT) was established by Dr. Ramani in 1981 exclusively for healthcare service activities under the guidance of the Sankaracharyas of Kanchi. SKKMT is the parent organization of Sankara Eye Hospitals (Sankara Eye Foundation – India).

The Sankara Movement – Leading millions to light (1985 – Present)

In the year 1985, due to increased efforts of the Government towards Primary healthcare in rural and urban areas, Dr. Ramani and SKKMT selected eye care as the chosen super-speciality of service – and thus began the Sankara Movement.

“A World class eye care with a social impact” was Dr. Ramani's dream.

Sankara Eye Hospitals (SEH) began in Coimbatore on the land donated by Late Mr. N. Natraj & Family in mid 80s. By 2023, the SEH family has expanded to 13 centers in 10 states with a total bed strength of 2500. Additionally, Sankara operates 41 vision centers with telemedicine facility across the Nation to expand the reach of quality eye care to the doorsteps of rural India.

As of May 2023, Sankara has screened over 1.3 crore patients and performed over 29.7 lakh eye surgeries.

Gift of Vision (GoV), a flagship initiative of SEFI to provide accessible, free-of-cost eye care for rural India began in 1990 with the involvement of Rotary Coimbatore Central and Mr.G.V.Eswar Chief Patron of Sankara Eye Foundation India.

Dr. Ramani defines community eye care as “high quality, cost effective, readily available eye care at the doorsteps of rural India”. Since then, Sankara has provided free eye surgeries to 24 lakh beneficiaries. Apart from GoV, SEFI has multiple other programs that benefit different strata of the society such as - “Rainbow program” for the school children and eye care program for Diabetic Retinopathy. Under the Rainbow program, 60 lakh children have been screened to date and treatment provided wherever indicated, a huge achievement in itself.

Dr. Ramani and Dr. Radha were instrumental in the inception and growth of Sankara Academy of Vision (SAV). It is the capacity building arm of the Sankara Eye Care Movement, offering Postgraduate and undergraduate courses for Doctors, Administrators, Optometrists and Paramedics.

Pioneering Work towards Eye Banking (1985–Present)

Corneal Blindness is the fourth leading cause of blindness in the world after cataract, glaucoma, and age-related macular degeneration. Corneal transplant is one of the primary treatments available for corneal blindness where damaged tissue is replaced with healthy donor eye tissue.

In the 80s, eye banking had not become widely available in India and the country was dependent on donations from Sri Lanka. Many myths and superstitions surrounded the noble act of tissue donation at the time and not many would have dared to plunge themselves into the cause as Dr. Ramani did in 1985. Dr. Ramani helped channelize thousands of initiatives for awareness towards eye donation and made it a people's movement.

After its founding at Coimbatore, Sankara Eye Banks are now operating at Sankara Eye Hospitals in Shimoga, Guntur, Anand, Bengaluru and Ludhiana.

Dr. Ramani continues to serve Sankara Eye Foundation, India and, provides his resources and expertise free of cost.

== Awards and Achievements ==
- 1980 - Dr. R.V. Ramani was selected as a Group Study Exchange Team Member of Rotary International and visited the US as an Ambassador of goodwill.
- 1982 - Outstanding young person Award of Jaycees International.
- 1985 - Young Doctor Award of Jaycees International.
- 1986 - Meritorious Service Award of Lions International.
- 1989 - Past President of Rotary Club of Coimbatore Central, the first 100% Paul Harris Fellow Club.
- 1996 - Lifetime Achievement Award by Kasturba Medical College Alumni.
- 2000 - Role Model of India Award presented at New Delhi.
- 2000 - Award by Veda Vyasa Sabha Trust.
- 2000 - Vaidyarathna Award presented by Sri Kanchi Kamakoti Peetam, Kanchipuram.
- 2001 - Sankara Eye Foundation, USA award for 25 years of pioneering service in the field of community eye care.
- 2002 - One of the Great Achievers of the year 2002 as identified by the Indian Express Daily.
- 2004 - Navajeevan Sight Saver Award 2004 in recognition of his outstanding services to the Society
- 2005 - Certificate of appreciation from the New York eye and ear infirmary.
- 2005 - Visionary Award by Andhra Society in Greater New York Region and New York.
- 2006 - Dr. R.K. Seth Memorial Award for Community Ophthalmology.
- 2007 - Dr.K.S.Sanjivi Award by CIOSA for the outstanding medical services to the poor and the needy
- 2007 - Mrs. P. Pattanayak Memorial Award, 2006 was presented by INDIAN ALUMNI GROUP OF ICEH, LONDON at Hyderabad on 31st Jan 2007 for his selfless, devoted Community Eye Care Services.
- 2007 - Service to Humanity Award by Rotary Foundation Zone 6 Alumni.
- 2008 - Asia Leadership Summit – NEW YORK - Nov 5th & 6th – 2008 - “The Tale of two challenges”
- Renny Abraham TANKER Foundation Love for Service Award.
- 2010 - Heroes of Humanity Award by the Art of Living Foundation.
- 2012 - The spirit of Mastek Award by Mastek Foundation
- 2013 - Kochousheph Chittiappilly Award for the outstanding humanitarian service by Rotary Dist. 3201
- 2013 - For the Sake of Honour Award by Rotary Club of Udumalpet.
- 2014 - IMC Ramakrishna Bajaj National Quality Excellence Award, Mumbai.
- 2016 - International Agency for Prevention of Blindness (IAPB), Regional achievement award for Southeast Asia – 2016, was awarded to Dr R.V. Ramani for his contribution to Eye Care.
- 2016 - 19th Mahaveer Award in the field of Medicine and Social Service
- 2019 - Awarded Padma Shri in the year 2019 by the Government of India (The 4th most Prestigious Award in the Country).
- 2019 - Qimpro Gold Standard Award
- 2020 - Chosen and appointed by Government of India as a Board of Governor in Super session of Medical Council of India (MCI)
- 2022 - Quality Champion Platinum Award 2022 by Quality Council of India
- 2022 - Healthcare Icon of the Year 2022 by The Economic Times
- 2022 - Best CEO of the year 2022 in the Southern region by Indian Chamber of Commerce
- 2022 - Hero of Indian Ophthalmology Award by Kerala Society of Ophthalmic Surgeons
- 2023 - IFocus Lifetime Achievement Award for the year 2023 by Centre for Sight
- 2026 - Dr Ramanathan V Ramani, the founder and managing trustee has been awarded the PSG Vishwa Seva Rathna Award by PSG & Sons’ Charities
