= PSGR Krishnammal College for Women =

College in Tamil Nadu, India

- Motto: "Educate to Empower"
- Type: Private
- Established: 1963
- Affiliations: Bharathiar University
- Chairperson: Dr. Nandini Rangaswamy
- Principal: Dr. P. B. Harathi
- Location: Coimbatore, Tamil Nadu, India
- Campus: Urban
- Website: psgrkcw.ac.in

PSGR Krishnammal College for Women, is an autonomous arts and science college located in Coimbatore, Tamil Nadu. India. It has been recognized as the 'College of Excellence' by the University Grants Commission.

== History ==
PSGR Krishnammal College for Women was established in 1963 under the GRG Trust, founded by Sri G.R. Govindarajulu and Smt. Chandrakanthi Govindarajulu with a motto of 'empowering women through education', initially affiliated to the University of Madras.

== Rankings ==
College rankings

General – India
- NIRF (Colleges) (2022): 6

The college is ranked 7th among colleges in India by the National Institutional Ranking Framework (NIRF) in 2024.

== Academics ==
The college offers undergraduate, graduate and doctoral degrees in arts, science, commerce, computer science, and management. It has global collaborative agreements with Oregon State University, San Diego State University and Toledo University, USA; Universiti Malaysia Pahang, Malaysia; Nottingham Trent University, UK; CETYS University, Mexico; and Swinburne University, Australia.
