= Sankara Eye Hospital =

Sankara Eye Hospitals

Geography
- Location: Tamil Nadu, India

Organisation
- Type: Specialist

Services
- Beds: 2250
- Speciality: Ophthalmology

History
- Founded: 1977

Links
- Website: www.sankaraeye.com

Sankara Eye Hospital is a not for profit charitable trust which aims at providing affordable eye care and eliminating curable eye blindness in India. Having its headquarters in Coimbatore, Tamil Nadu, Sankara is among the largest community eye care providers in India with ten super specialty eye care hospitals across the country performing over 150,000 free eye surgeries annually.

The hospital follows an 80:20 business model, in which 80 per cent of the patients from rural parts of the country are treated for free, and the remaining 20 per cent are the rich and the middle income sections of the society, who pay for their treatment, thereby cross-subsidizing the free surgeries and making the Hospital self-sustaining. In 2013, Sankara conducted its one millionth free eye surgery.

== History ==
The organization was founded in 1977 by Dr.R.V. Ramani, one of the earliest Doctors of Coimbatore, and his wife Dr. Radha Ramani. The origins of Sankara Eye Foundation can be traced back to the Sri Kanchi Kamakoti Medical Trust. During the initial 5 years of the Movement, the Honorary Panel of Doctors slowly expanded and 75 Consultants from various specialties of medicine came forward voluntarily to join the team in an honorary capacity. By 1982, the activities of the Trust had grown considerably well, and in 1985, the Trust identified community eye care as the major specialized activity. Sankara Eye Hospital was thus established in Sivanandapuram, Coimbatore on the land donated by Late N. Natraj & Family.

== Expansion ==
The Sankara Eye Hospital since its inception has now established 11 hospitals across the nation replicating the 80:20 model.

Guntur, Andhra Pradesh Sankara Eye Hospital, was established in the year 2004 (March). Built in over 4.35 acres land, the hospital is a 225 bed capacity facility.

Krishnankoil, Tamil Nadu was inaugurated on February 4, 2004 by Sri. VijayKumar IAS, Collector of Ramanathapuram District and Sri Mohamed Aslam IAS, Collector of Virudhunagar District. Built in over 6.1 acres land, the hospital is a 225 bed capacity facility.

Anand, Gujarat Sankara Eye Hospital, was established in the year 2008. The hospital was inaugurated by then Chief Minister Shri Narendra Modi. Built in over 5.5 acres land, the hospital is a 225 bed capacity facility.

Bangalore, Karnataka was inaugurated in 2008 and it has attained self-sufficiency because of the paying patients it is able to attract. Built in over 4 acres land, the hospital is a 225 bed capacity facility.

Shivamoga, Karnataka was inaugurated on October 12, 2008. It was made possible due to the initiative of a group of residents from Shimoga who heard about Sankara and approached the group for setting up a hospital in Shimoga. Built in over 5.5 acres land, the hospital is a 225 bed capacity facility.

Coimbatore, Tamil Nadu (R.S. Puram) was established in the year 2011. The hospital functions as a facility performing day care surgery with an operation theatre complex, outpatient clinics and optical services.

Ludhiana, Punjab was inaugurated on April 2, 2012 by Charanjeet Singh Atwal, speaker of the Punjab Vidhan Sabha, in the presence of Sankaracharya of Sri Kanchi Kamakoti Peetam Sri Jayendra Saraswathi and Singh Sahib Giani Gurbachan Singh, Jathedhar of Sri Akal Takht Sahib, among others. Built in over 2 acres of gifted land, the hospital is having 125 beds in total where 100 dedicated for the free patients and 25 rooms for the paying patients.

Kanpur, Uttar Pradesh Sankara Eye Hospital, Kanpur, Uttar Pradesh was inaugurated on October 12, 2014. Sankaracharya of Kanchi was present for the inaugural function.

Jaipur, Rajasthan Sankara Eye Hospital is opening its doors to eye care needs of Jaipur for the first time in December 2017. The Hospital performs Refractions to advanced eye care surgeries of Cataract, Retinal surgeries, Corneal Transplants, Paediatric Eye care and Squints, Glaucoma.

Sankara Eye Centre, Indore, Madhya Pradesh the 11th eye hospital of Sankara Eye Foundation, India. This hospital is designed to deliver eye treatment related with Cornea, Retina, Glaucoma, and Diabetic retinopathy to the both rural and urban peoples of Indore, Madhya Pradesh.

== Sankara Eye Bank ==
The Sankara Eye Bank Coimbatore started functioning from 1987 to promote organ and tissue donation through a program of public and professional education and donor registration; and to procure and distribute eye tissue for transplant surgery. The Sankara Eye Bank is recognized as a model eye bank by the Government of India, receiving a pair of eyes every day.

Currently the Eye Banks are operational in Coimbatore, Bangalore, Shivamogga, Anand and Guntur.
