= Kashmir Reader =

English daily newspaper published from Srinagar

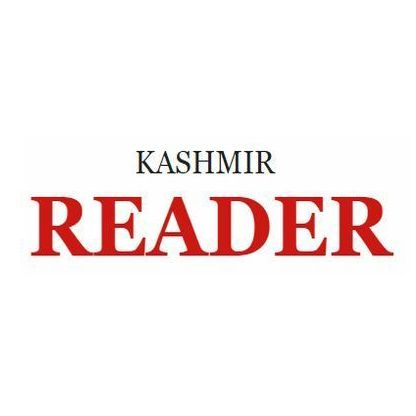
- Type: Daily newspaper
- Format: Broadsheet
- Owner(s): Haji Hayat Mohammad
- Founder(s): Haji Hayat Mohammad
- News editor: Bilal Bhat
- Founded: May 15, 2012
- Language: English
- Headquarters: Srinagar
- Website: kashmirreader.com

Kashmir Reader is an English-language daily newspaper published from Srinagar, and is owned by the Helpline Group. It was launched in May 2012 with the motto of "Nothing But News".

Kashmir Reader has published articles by well-known Kashmiri writers and journalists, including Gautam Navlakha, Hilal Ahmad Mir, Abdul Mohamin, Yasir Ashraf, Moazum Mohammad Bhat, Bilal Bhat.

== Newspaper ban ==
Kashmir Reader was indefinitely banned for 'inciting violence' by Indian authorities on September 30 during 2016 Kashmir uprising. It was asked to stop publication on the evening of Sunday, October 2. The daily was accused of publishing material that "tends to incite acts of violence" and "disturb public peace and tranquility". Human rights group Amnesty International said the ban was a "setback to free speech" and that the government "cannot shut down a newspaper simply for being critical of the government," calling on authorities to revoke the order. The "order does not specifically mention any news items in Kashmir Reader that incited violence," said Aakar Patel, executive director, Amnesty International India. On 28 December, the newspaper resumed publication after the government lifted the ban after nearly three months.
