= M. Shanmugavel =

M. Shanmugavel, (4 July 1927 - 11 December 2007) popularly known as MS, was a Tamil journalist and the editor of Makkal Kural, Nixs News Tamil in Coimbatore, and Trinity Mirror.

== Biography ==
Shanmugavel started his journalistic career in 1946 at the Daily Thanthi in Coimbatore. In the mid-1950s, he formed a cooperative venture with other journalists, Navamani, a Tamil-language evening newspaper. The paper twice won the Central government's best display award. After a few years, he quit the Navamani and founded Alai Osai.

In 1973, Shanmugaval started his own venture, Makkal Kural, as a limited company. He was invited by Prime Ministers Indira Gandhi, Rajiv Gandhi and Narashima Rao to accompany them on their foreign tours on several occasions, and also attended the UN conference and the Davos economic summit.

Shanmugavel died on 11 December 2007.

== Awards ==
Shanmugavel won the Central government's award for best layout and news presentations five times, twice for Tamil and three times for the English paper. He was a member of Temples committee under HR and CE department headed by then Chief Minister of Tamil Nadu Jayalalitha and was also a member of the high-level committee for prohibition enforcement constituted by the Government of Tamil Nadu.
