= Sankara Eye Foundation =

U.S.-based non-profit organization

Sankara Eye Foundation (SEF) USA is a US-based non-profit organization that workss toward eliminating curable blindness in India. SEF is a 501(c)(3) registered non-profit organization.

== Beginning ==
Founded in 1998 by Murali Krishnamurthy, K. Sridharan, and Sridharan's neighbor Ahmad Khushnood with the help of their first donor, Harihara Moorthy. At the urging of their uncle Mr. P. Balasubramaniam of India, brothers Murali and Sridharan became motivated to help Sankara Eye Hospital run by Dr.R.V. Ramani (awarded with Padma Shri), whose mission headquarters is in Coimbatore, India.

Foundation raises $1.4 million to end curable blindness in India through its gala programme, 'Be the Light' in New York in September 2023.

== Sustainable Development Goals ==
The Foundation's Vision 2030 is modeled after the United Nations' Sustainable Development Goals and it aims to end avoidable blindness in India by providing 1 million free eye surgeries annually by the year 2030. It has done 355,000 free eye surgeries in 2022. In October 2024, it opened one more branch, RJ Sankara Eye Hospital in Varanasi, which was inaugurated by prime minister Narendra Modi. It has a network of 27 hospitals in 14 states in India.
