= 2016–2017 Kashmir unrest =

Pro Independence demonstrations in Indian Administered Kashmir

2016 Kashmir Riots
- Part of the Insurgency in Jammu and Kashmir
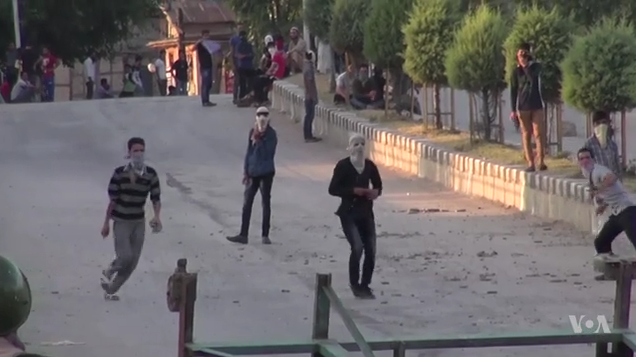
- Kashmiri youths throwing stones at Indian Troops
- Date: 8 July 2016 – February 2017
- Location: Kashmir Valley, Jammu and Kashmir, India
- Caused by: Killing of Burhan Wani; Reaction to Hindu nationalism; Persistent militarisation of Kashmir; Shrinking political space
- Goals: Demilitarization of valley; Repeal of AFSPA and Public Safety Act; Independence/autonomy/self-determination for Kashmir
- Methods: Protests; Mob violence Stone-pelting; General strikes

Parties
Government of India; (Jammu and Kashmir (state)) Government of Jammu and Kashmir; Jammu and Kashmir Police; Central Reserve Police Force; Indian Armed Forces; Indian Army	Kashmiri protesters and separatists: All Parties Hurriyat Conference; Jammu and Kashmir Liberation Front; Dukhtaran-e-Millat

Lead figures
Narendra Modi; Rajnath Singh; Mehbooba Mufti; K. Durga Prasad; D.S. Hooda	Syed Ali Shah Geelani; Mirwaiz Umar Farooq; Yasin Malik; Asiya Andrabi; Burhan Wani †

Casualties and losses
3 soldiers killed 2 policemen killed 4,000+ security personnel injured	100+ protestors killed 15,000+ injured
- 8,587 arrested 1,000+ detained

The 2016 Kashmir Riots, also known as the Burhan aftermath, refers to protests in Indian Administered Kashmir, chiefly in the Kashmir Valley. It started after the killing of militant leader Burhan Wani by Indian security forces on 8 July 2016. Wani was a commander of the Kashmir-based Islamist militant organisation Hizbul Mujahideen.

Curfew was imposed in all 10 districts of the valley on 15 July and mobile services were suspended. Protests started in all 10 districts of the Kashmir Valley. Protesters defied curfew with attacks on security forces and public properties. Kashmir valley then remained under 53 consecutive days of curfew. The curfew was lifted on 31 August, but was reimposed in some areas the next day.

Jammu and Kashmir police and Indian paramilitary forces used pellet guns, tear gas shells, rubber bullets, as well as assault rifles. More than 90 civilians were killed and over 15,000 civilians were injured, including many who were blinded by pellet guns. Two security personnel died and over 4,000 were injured.

Columnists including Prem Shankar Jha termed the unrest as Kashmir's Intifada.

== Background ==
In the 2014 Indian general election, the Bharatiya Janata Party (BJP) won a majority in the Lower House of the Indian Parliament. Narendra Modi became the prime minister. In the accompanying state Legislative Assembly elections the Peoples Democratic Party (PDP) won a majority of the seats in Kashmir and the BJP won the majority in Jammu. Even though the parties campaigned against each other, they formed a coalition government, with Mufti Mohammad Sayeed as chief minister. Following Sayeed's death in 2016, his daughter Mehbooba Mufti took over as chief minister, becoming the first female chief minister of the state.

In late 2015 and early 2016, observers of Kashmir reported growth in Islamic militancy and increased radicalization of the Kashmiri Muslim population. Reasons for the growth included the absence of political dialogue, lack of economic opportunities, high unemployment, excessive militarization and repeated human rights violations by the security forces. According to Haris Zargar, the increasing radicalization was a reaction to Indian nationalist identity. The rise of Hindu nationalism affected how Kashmiri Muslims viewed the Indian state and reshaped their identity. The polarization in India and the violence targeting Muslims were widely discussed in Kashmiri homes.

Wani's militant Islamic wing, Hizbul Mujahideen, was dubbed "new-age militancy". It was designated a terrorist organization. It recruited youth, the educated and middle-class, who were conversant with social media and not afraid to reveal their identities. They achieved popularity among the Kashmiris. When Waseem Malla and Naseer Ahmad Pandit, two of Burhan's associates were killed by security forces, tens of thousands attended the funeral; funeral rites had to be repeated six times to allow all to participate. Youths who recently became militants campaigned for PDP during the general elections in 2014.

=== Death of Burhan Wani ===
On 8 July 2016, Burhan Wani was killed in a planned operation by the Jammu and Kashmir Police and the Rashtriya Rifles. Following a tip-off that Wani was planning to come down from the Tral forest for Eid celebrations, he and two associates were cornered in the Kokernag area. According to police officials, after an exchange of fire, the house in which the militants were staying was bombed, killing all three militants. Some eyewitnesses stated that the three were shot while trying to escape.

According to a police official, the security establishment was conflicted about killing Wani owing to his popularity, but the misgivings were not heeded. Wani left home to become a militant at age 15 after an incident with the police that humiliated him. Kashmiri youth angered by the "never-ending militarization" of the Valley were drawn to him. His constant presence on social media made him a household name.

Journalist Fahad Shah stated that, with Wani's killing, the situation in Kashmir entered a period of "amplified instability". At Wani's funeral, an estimated 200,000 people came to mourn him. Forty funeral prayers were offered as well as a 21-gun salute by militants. His death launched demonstrations, and many incidents of stone-pelting were reported. (Note: Journalist Praveen Swami estimated from the video footage that the attendees at the funeral numbered about 15,000 people. He stated that the estimates of 200,000 were exaggerated.)

== Organizations involved ==
Several separatist and terrorist organizations were actively involved in inciting unrest and fueling anti government sentiment in Jammu and Kashmir. These groups played a significant role in organizing protests, issuing hartal calls, and provoking violence in the region, particularly following the killing of Hizbul Mujahideen commander Burhan Wani. Allegedly acting on the instructions of foreign entities, including Pakistan’s intelligence agency Inter-Services Intelligence (ISI), these organizations, according to Indian sources, sought to destabilize the region by exploiting public sentiment and spreading misinformation.

In a significant development that highlighted the shifting landscape in Jammu and Kashmir, six separatist and terrorist organizations failed to appear before a tribunal to contest the bans imposed on them under the Unlawful Activities (Prevention) Act (UAPA) by the Government of India in 2024. These organizations—comprising four factions of the Jammu and Kashmir Peoples League (JKPL), Muslim Conference Jammu & Kashmir (Bhat faction), and Muslim Conference Jammu and Kashmir (Sumji faction)—were accused of inciting and orchestrating unrest following key events, including the killing of militant Burhan Wani. The Centre stated that these groups, operating under instructions from Pakistan and its intelligence agency ISI, had incited violence and mobilized mass protests through hartal calls and protest calendars, which led to the deaths of 86 civilians, injuries to nearly 9,000 others, and harm to over 8,000 security personnel.

Despite multiple opportunities, including public hearings held in Srinagar, the groups did not present any defense or evidence before the tribunal, effectively accepting the bans. The tribunal confirmed the government's action after an objective review of the evidence, as mandated by precedent. According to the Centre's submission, the organizations had been involved in spreading misinformation and provoking unrest during incidents such as the "Amarnath land row" and the Shopian case of 2009. The refusal of these groups to engage with the legal process was noted as a tacit acknowledgment of the allegations presented against them.

== Timeline of unrest ==
=== 2016 ===
==== July ====
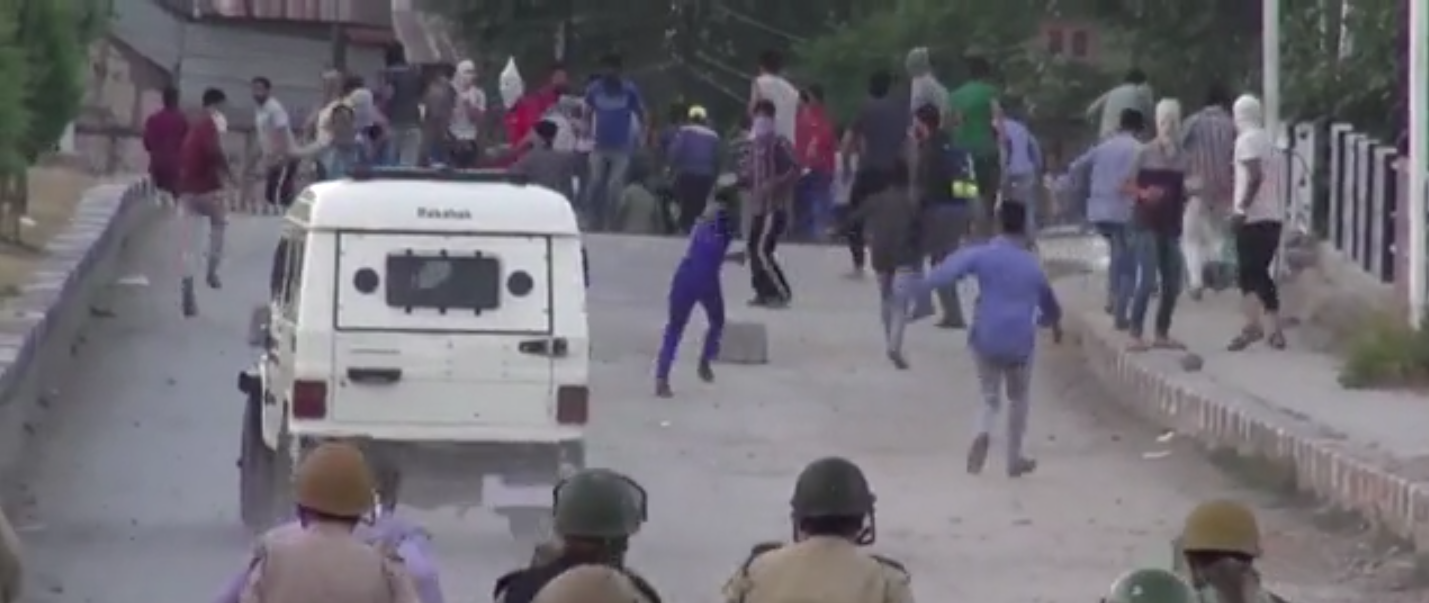
Police and stone-throwing demonstrator clash on a street in Srinagar.

After the news of Wani's death spread, protests erupted in some areas of Kashmir Valley. Curfew-like restrictions were imposed in South Kashmir during the night, and internet services in many areas were suspended. Hurriyat chairman Syed Ali Shah Geelani and Jammu Kashmir Liberation Front chairman Yasin Malik called for a strike to protest against the killing. Geelani, along with other separatist leaders including Asiya Andrabi and Mirwaiz Umar Farooq, called for a three-day shutdown. The shutdown extended into August.

Violent clashes broke out on 9 July in some areas. Over 20 police stations were attacked by mobs who stole weapons and fired upon security forces. Stone pelting was reported from many parts of Kashmir, including transit camps of Kashmiri Pandits. Train services and the pilgrimage to Amarnath Temple were suspended. State board exams were postponed, while the Jammu–Srinagar National Highway was shut. By the end of the day, over 200 people were injured and 11 protesters were killed. By 10 July, more than 20 were confirmed to have died. More than 300 CRPF personnel were reported to have been injured. In addition, many vehicles and buildings belonging to security forces were attacked and a number were set ablaze. Some militants hiding among protesters threw grenades at security personnel.

Two policemen died. One (Feroz Ahmed) of Mattan, Anantnag died on 9 July when a mob attacked and pushed his mobile bunker into Jhelum river. Another died on 24 July, from injuries received in an attack on a police station by stone-pelters on 15 July.

On the night of 12 July, about 200–300 Kashmiri Pandit employees fled the transit camps in Kashmir due to the constant attacks. Over 1300 government employees belonging to the community fled the region. 800 personnel of the Central Reserve Police Force (CRPF) meanwhile were sent to Kashmir, adding to the 1,200 sent on 9 July.

On 15 July, curfew was imposed across Kashmir and mobile phone networks were suspended. On the same day, separatists extended the shutdown until 18 July. Re-opening of schools and colleges in Kashmir was postponed. The government announced that it was sending 2,000 additional CRPF personnel to Kashmir.

The law-and-order situation had started to improve by 24 July. Curfew was lifted from four districts and parts of Srinagar city, while Section 144 of Code of Criminal Procedure remained in force. By 26 July, it was lifted everywhere except Anantnag.

Protests erupted in many areas after the lifting of the curfew. It was reimposed a day later in Kulgam district, Anantnag and some parts of Srinagar in view of the march called by separatists. It was later reimposed in Pulwama district and Shopian district as well.

On 29 July, violent clashes broke out in several places. Over 130 people were reported injured. 70 incidents of stone-pelting were reported, including attacks on army camps. During the protests, a government building in Rafiabad and an animal husbandry office in Shopian were set on fire, and a grenade lobbed in Shopian. On 30 July, the motorcade of state Education Minister Naeem Akhtar, who was traveling with MLC Yashir Reshi, was pelted with stones by crowds who were later dispersed at Dangerpora and Shilwat.

==== August ====
On 1 August, protesters in Srinagar attacked state Education Minister Naeem Akhtar's residence with petrol bombs. Akhtar and his family were not present at the time. The cavalcade of Law and Rural Development Minister Abdul Haq was attacked with stones by protesters in Tangdhar area managed to escape the attack unhurt. A mob attacked the vehicle of the Additional Deputy Commissioner (ADC) of Ramban with stones and set it ablaze on the national highway near Lethpora. Two protesters were killed in defence by a Personal Security Officer of the ADC who was rescued by the CRPF.

The shutdown was repeatedly extended by separatists into September.

The unrest spread to the Chenab valley region of Jammu Division in August with shutdowns being observed in many towns. Protests against civilian casualties were held in Doda with people shouting pro-freedom slogans. On 5 August curfew was imposed in several places in view of the march called by separatists. Three people were killed and 674 injured during violent clashes that erupted after Friday prayers.

The separatists asked Kashmiris to observe a "black day" on 15 August on 11 August. Curfew was extended in several parts of Kashmir the next day in view of the separatists' call for marching to the Eidgah on 13 and 14 August. The next day after Friday prayers, violent protests erupted in several cities, leaving hundreds of people injured. Protests followed Friday prayers in Doda against the civilian deaths in Kashmir. Many were injured in the clashes, with police and protesters blaming each other. The Seerat committee called for a three-day shutdown.

Most parts of Kashmir were placed under curfew on 13 August.

On Pakistan's Independence Day, flags of Pakistan were hoisted across Kashmir and pro-Pakistan rallies were carried out, with dozens of people reported injured when security personnel tried to disperse them. Separatist leader Asiya Andrabi was injured along with many other protesters while leading a women-only rally in Tral when security personnel used teargas.

On 16 August, five protesters were shot and killed by security personnel.

On 17 August, a march called by the separatists to the office of UNMOGIP, in Srinagar, was stopped by security forces. On the same day, the house of the MLA of Shopian, Mohammed Yousuf Bhat, was attacked by a mob.

On 21 August, a youth was killed after he was hit by a teargas shell in Srinagar while 70 others were injured in protests across the region, including about 60 people in a village of Rafiabad Tehsil. Pro-freedom rallies were held at Anantnag, Shopian and Pulwama, with 40,000 people attending a rally in a Shopian village addressed by separatists including Geelani. The Border Security Force (BSF) was removed from counter-insurgency operations and deployed to maintain law and order in Srinagar for the first time in 12 years on 22 August. On 23 August, two special police officers in Sopore resigned after their houses were attacked by mobs.

On 24 August, a youth died after receiving injuries in a clash with security forces while 9 policemen were reportedly injured when a grenade was lobbed at them in Pulwama.

Curfew was lifted from all parts of Kashmir on 31 August. One person was killed while over 100 were injured in clashes during the day. A police quarters and house of Rajya Sabha member of PDP, Nazir Ahmad Laway were set on fire by protesters in Hanad Chawalgam of Kulgam district.

==== September ====
Curfew was reimposed in most places on 2 September including Srinagar, Badgam, Ganderbal, Bandipora and Handwara. The next day, curfew was lifted from most places, with only some areas of Srinagar remaining under curfew. Meanwhile, a youth was killed in clashes in Qazigund. Over 600 people were reported to have been injured on 4 September. The office of Deputy Commissioner in Shopian was torched. On 5 September, a youth who had been wounded a day earlier, died from his injuries in Sopore. Over 120 people were injured. In Zangalpora village of Kulgam, protesters set a policeman's house on fire.

On 15 September, the shutdown was extended until 22 September. On 16 September, a protester died who had been injured on 9 September. Over 50 people were injured including 15 in Dooru village and 20 in Sopore.

On 7 September, over 250 protesters were injured. A Jawahar Navodaya Vidyalaya school in Kulgam caught fire after teargas shells landed inside the school compound. Meanwhile, a rest house in Chawalgam village of Kulgam was set on fire after protesters hurled petrol bombs at it. Curfew and restrictions on assembly of people were lifted. They were reimposed in most parts of Srinagar on 9 September, but were lifted again the next day. Two protesters were killed on 10 September.

Curfew was reimposed on 13 September across the entire region in view of the call for a march to the UN offices in Kashmir, while helicopters and drones were deployed. This was the first time in 26 years that curfew had been imposed in the region during Eid al-Adha. Eid congregations were barred at the Eidgah and Hazratbal Shrine. Two protesters were killed. On 17 September, the body of an 11-year-old boy, who went missing in protests on the previous day in Harwan, was found near a stream at Dachigam National Park. He had been hit by pellets. Protests erupted in Harwan and other areas after the news of his death. Several people were injured.

On 19 September, curfew was lifted from all areas except some parts of Srinagar. A 19-year-old girl died of cardiac arrest in Shopian district while a school in Vehil village of the district was burnt under unknown circumstances. The police blamed the protesters for setting the fire, however locals denied the accusation. Another school in Anantnag district was also burnt. Curfew was lifted from all parts of Kashmir on 25 September, as the separatists declared a temporary relaxation in the shutdown.

Curfew was reimposed in Kishtwar after clashes erupted due to the arrest of three youths. It was lifted two days later, with night curfew remaining in place.

Operation Calm Down was launched by the Indian army to restore normalcy and connectivity to regions that had been most affected, especially in South Kashmir. The additional 4000 troops were ordered to use minimal force. Tasks involved ensuring schools opened and were secure.

==== November ====
On 16 November, separatists announced a full-day relaxation for two days on 19 and 20 November. This was the first such relaxation since the beginning of the unrest.

==== December ====
The separatists increased a full-day relaxation to five days on 14 December, calling for shutdown on two days. They also stated on 16 December that they would announce an annual protest program.

=== 2017 ===
==== February ====
The separatists called off their strikes in mid-February, including the one scheduled for 24 February as it coincided with the Shivaratri festival celebrated by the Hindu community.

== Casualties ==
More than 100 people including 5 security personnel died. Over 19,000 people including more than 15,000 civilians as well as 4,000 security personnel were injured. According to local doctors, at least 117 civilians were likely to lose their eyesight as a result of injuries caused by buckshot blasts. Three policemen went missing on 9 July and one was killed on 10 July during protests in Anantnag district when a mob pushed his vehicle into the Jhelum river. Another policeman died on 24 July, succumbing to injuries received on 15 July during an attack on a police station in Kulgam. Two of the missing policemen were later traced by the state police and were found to have become incommunicado after mobile services were cut. Security forces were not able to find the third policeman, or a large cache of arms that went missing after a police station in south Kashmir was immolated. On 18 September 2016, 18 Indian Army soldiers were killed during an attack by militants in Uri. The target was a Brigade headquarters.

=== Use of pellet guns ===
Indian security forces trying to control the Kashmiri agitators used pellet guns, which, although billed as "non-lethal", led to many casualties including permanent eye injuries. 10 civilians were killed by pellet gunfire.

The medical emergency in Kashmir led to a shortage of eye specialists who could treat the injured. In Shri Maharaja Hari Singh (SMHS) Hospital of Srinagar, over 200 patients were admitted by 13 July with the same problem. A five-year-old, Zohra Zahoor, had pellet wounds in her legs, forehead and abdomen. Human Rights Watch strongly condemned the use of pellet guns on protesters and called it a failure by the authorities to respect basic human rights. According to a Sky News report, the Indian paramilitary fired up to 3,800 cartridges between July and August, each containing 450 metal balls, up to 1.7 million pellets.

A team of three eye-specialists from the All India Institute of Medical Sciences in New Delhi, headed by ophthalmologist Prof Sudarshan K. Kumar, reached Kashmir to help the local doctors treat the pellet gun injuries. By 22 July, the SMHS Hospital had received at least 182 patients with eye injuries, mostly due to pellets. More than 137 eye surgeries took place. Another team of three eye-specialists, led by ophthalmologist Sundaram Natarajan of Aditya Jyot Eye Hospital, Mumbai, organized by Adhik Kadam of Borderless World Foundation arrived in the region on 26 July to treat eye injuries and performed over 40 retinal surgeries in 3 days. By 28 August 570 people had been treated in the SMHS hospital and 425 eye surgeries were performed. About 3,000 civilians were injured.

== Events ==
=== Media blackout ===
On 9 July, mobile internet services were suspended in Kashmir and Jammu to reduce rumor-mongering. On 16 July, the Jammu and Kashmir government imposed a press emergency. The police raided newspaper installations and seized copies of newspapers and printing plates. They said that, in view of the curfew, movement of newspaper staff and the distribution of newspapers would not be possible "for a few days". Landline and mobile telephone services were blocked, except for the lines of a government-owned company, BSNL. Internet services remained suspended. Cable television was also shut off, ostensibly to stop the broadcast of Pakistani channels.

On 19 July, Chief Minister Mehbooba Mufti denied the ban on newspapers. Her adviser Amitabh Mattoo hinted that the decision was taken at the "local level". Mattoo also declared that newspapers would be able to print from 19 July. However, the newspapers refused to publish, alleging uncertainties about the restrictions. One editor asked the government to "own the ban" and issue a statement guaranteeing that the media would not be hampered. The chief minister held a meeting with Srinagar-based newspaper editors, expressing regret for the restrictions and assuring them that their work would not be hampered. Following this, the newspapers resumed deliveries on Thursday. The senior superintendent of police of Budgam district Fayaz Ahamad Lone was held responsible for raiding the press and transferred.

Mobile internet was restored in Jammu on 26 July. Mobile telephone services were restored on 27 July for most postpaid and some prepaid numbers in Kashmir. Mobile internet was suspended again in Jammu on 5 August in view of the growing unrest in Chenab valley however they were restored later the same day. Mobile telephone services in Kashmir were suspended again on 11 August. In addition, broadband services were suspended in Kashmir on 13 August, stopping Internet service. Broadband internet was restored on 18 August. Mobile services were again partially restored in Kashmir on 20 August.

On 12 September, the state government again ordered the suspension of internet and mobile phone services in Kashmir excluding postpaid connections of BSNL for a period of 72 hours.

In April 2017, state authorities banned 22 social media sites for a one-month period in an effort to calm tensions in the disputed region after videos depicting the alleged abuse of Kashmiris by Indian forces emerged.

=== Newspaper ban ===
Kashmir Reader, a prominent English newspaper which is published in Srinagar, was indefinitely banned by the state authorities on 30 September. It was asked to stop publication on the evening of Sunday, 2 October. The ban order, issued by the Deputy Commissioner of Srinagar Farooq Ahmad Lone cited that the reason for this was that the newspaper contains "material and content which tends to incite acts of violence and disturb public peace and tranquility".

A variety of individuals, academic and civil groups in Kashmir and international rights groups, such as Jammu and Kashmir Coalition of Civil Society (JKCCS), Kashmir Economic Alliance (KEA), the Kashmir Center for Social and Development Studies (KCSDS) and Amnesty International, among others have decried this as a clampdown on freedom of expression and democracy in Kashmir, as a part of the massive media censorship of the unrest undertaken by the central government. Working journalists protested the ban by marching to the Directorate of Information and Public Relations while the Kashmir Editors Guild (KEG) held an emergency meeting in Srinagar, thereafter asking the government to revoke the ban immediately, and asking for the intervention of the Press Council of India. Most of the major Kashmiri dailies have also rallied behind the KR, while claiming that the move represented a political vendetta against the newspaper for reporting events in the unrest as they happened on the ground. Hurriyat leaders, known to champion the cause of Kashmiri independence, also recorded their protests against the banning of the newspaper. Amnesty International released a statement saying that "the government has a duty to respect the freedom of the press, and the right of people to receive information," and that the move was a "setback to free speech" and called on authorities to revoke the order. The journalists associated with the paper allege that, contrary to the claims of the J&K government, they had not been issued a notice or warning, and had been asked to stop production suddenly, which was only one manifestation of the wider media gag on Kashmir. Previously, the state government had banned newspapers for a few days in July, calling the move a "temporary measure to address an extraordinary situation", only to deflect the blame onto the police upon facing a tremendous backlash, and thereafter asking the presses to resume publication. On 28 December 2016, the newspaper resumed publication after the government lifted the ban after nearly three months.

=== Arrest of Khurram Parvez ===
Khurram Parvez, a prominent Kashmiri human rights activist, was first stopped by Indian authorities at New Delhi airport on 14 September to prevent him from attending the UN Human Rights Council session in Geneva. Parvez was arrested on 15 September by Indian officials from his home in Srinagar. On 21 September, a day after a sessions court ordered his release, Khurram Parvez was detained a second time under Public Safety Act (PSA). After 76 days of detention, on 30 November he was again released, following the orders of Jammu and Kashmir High Court.

=== Action against security personnel ===
Fayaz Ahamad Lone, the senior superintendent of police (SSP) of Budgam district who had ordered the police forces to raid press offices and stop the newspapers, was transferred to the State Disaster Response Fund as a commandant. Two officers were later transferred from South Kashmir: the deputy inspector general of police in South Kashmir and the senior superintendent of police in Anantnag.

The SSP in Srinagar was directed on 19 July by a local court to register a case against a deputy superintendent of police (DSP) and other police personnel for allegedly murdering a youth after breaking into his house on 10 July. It also ordered that the case could not be investigated by anyone below the rank of DSP. Instead of registering a case against the DSP, the state police registered a case against the youth over various offenses and alleged that he was leading a procession on the day he was killed. The court rejected the argument and ordered the SSP to register a case against the DSP within a day. A non-bailable warrant was later issued against the SSP for not obeying the court order and registering a case within the allotted time-period. The SSP was produced in the court by the Deputy Inspector General of Police of Central Kashmir and was granted bail. He was ordered to file his statement and register the case against the DSP. A petition against the filing of the report was dismissed by the Jammu and Kashmir High Court. The Court directed the Chief Judicial Magistrate of Srinagar to initiate contempt proceedings against the SSP if the report was not registered. The Supreme Court stayed the contempt proceedings as well as the Inspector General of Police in Kashmir on 9 August. The court directed the state government on 12 August to exhume the body and conduct an autopsy. The autopsy report was submitted to the Supreme Court on 26 September 2016, with the report concluding that he had died due to pellet injuries.

A CRPF sub-inspector who shot an ambulance driver on 18 August was suspended the following day. On 18 August, a probe was ordered into the death of a person who was killed after an Indian Army raid in a Khrew village. D.S. Hooda admitted the next day that the person was beaten to death by soldiers and stated that the raid on the village was unsanctioned.

=== Internet censorship ===
On 26 April 2017, the state government directed various Internet service providers (ISPs) to block access to 22 social networking websites, saying it was needed to prevent spreading of rumors and to maintain law and order in the state, under the Indian Telegraph Act, 1885. The youth used virtual private networks (VPNs), Internet proxies and other tools to circumvent the block.

== Reactions ==
=== India ===
==== Government and politicians ====
On 9 July, Home Minister Rajnath Singh appealed for peace and calm in Kashmir. On 10 July, the state government appealed to all the political parties including the separatists for help in restoring normalcy. Separatist leader Geelani agreed and asked Kashmiris to remain "disciplined" while Farooq ridiculed the appeal. Chief Minister of Jammu and Kashmir Mehbooba Mufti appealed for calm on 12 July. Prime Minister Modi expressed concern over the unrest and appealed for calm while promising help to the state government.

Congress party chairperson Sonia Gandhi expressed deep anguish at the loss of innocent lives. She pointed out advances made over the prior two decades and appealed to Kashmiris to let political parties find durable ways of fulfilling people's aspirations. Congress also dispatched a fact-finding team of senior leaders Ambika Soni and Salman Khurshid. They criticised the government for discontinuing development policies and for excessive force in dealing with protesters. The party demanded an all-party meet to discuss the Kashmir situation. The party later criticized Mufti for not knowing about Burhan's presence during the encounter and blamed the unrest in on her. It also criticised the Union government for continuing talks with Pakistan during the unrest.

Women's activist and CPIM party leader Kavita Krishnan termed Burhan Wani's death an "extrajudicial killing". She noted the Supreme Court decree that required every single encounter to be followed by a FIR and a magisterial enquiry.

On 17 July, Minister of State for External Affairs Vijay Kumar Singh urged people of Kashmir to cooperate with the government and stated that they had been misguided by unwanted elements. On 19 July, Home Minister Singh blamed Pakistan for the violence, stating, "Whatever is happening in Kashmir is Pakistan-sponsored. The name is 'Pakistan', but its acts are na-pak (impure)."

An all-party meeting was held on 21 July with the aim of building a consensus on measures to restore normalcy. The Jammu & Kashmir National Conference boycotted the meeting, blaming the government for the situation.

A two-day visit by Singh beginning on 23 July was announced, in which Singh visited Kashmir to try to calm down the situation. After arrival he met with local entrepreneurs, houseboat owners, Muslim clerics, members of the Sikh community, members of the Kashmiri Pandit community, and civilians. The meeting was boycotted by several trade groups, ostensibly due to the killings and lack of results from past meetings. Later in the day, he met Governor Narinder Nath Vohra and Chief Minister Mehbooba Mufti. On the second day he met political leaders and members of civil society – the Congress party boycotted the meeting.

The Supreme Court of India on 29 July sought a report from the Union Government while promising all possible help to Kashmiri civilians.

An all-party conference was announced on 10 August along with a visit by an all-party delegation to hold talks with various sections. During the New Delhi meeting on 12 August, various suggestions were made. Former Home Minister P. Chidambaram on 17 August blamed the state and union government for the unrest. A meeting of all opposition political parties in Jammu and Kashmir was held on the same day with resolutions demanding an enquiry by a retired Supreme Court Judge over allegations of use of excessive force, special assembly session on the unrest and the start of a political dialogue with Pakistan about the Kashmir dispute were passed. During the meeting, the participants decided that a delegation of opposition political parties would meet President Pranab Mukherjee over the unrest.

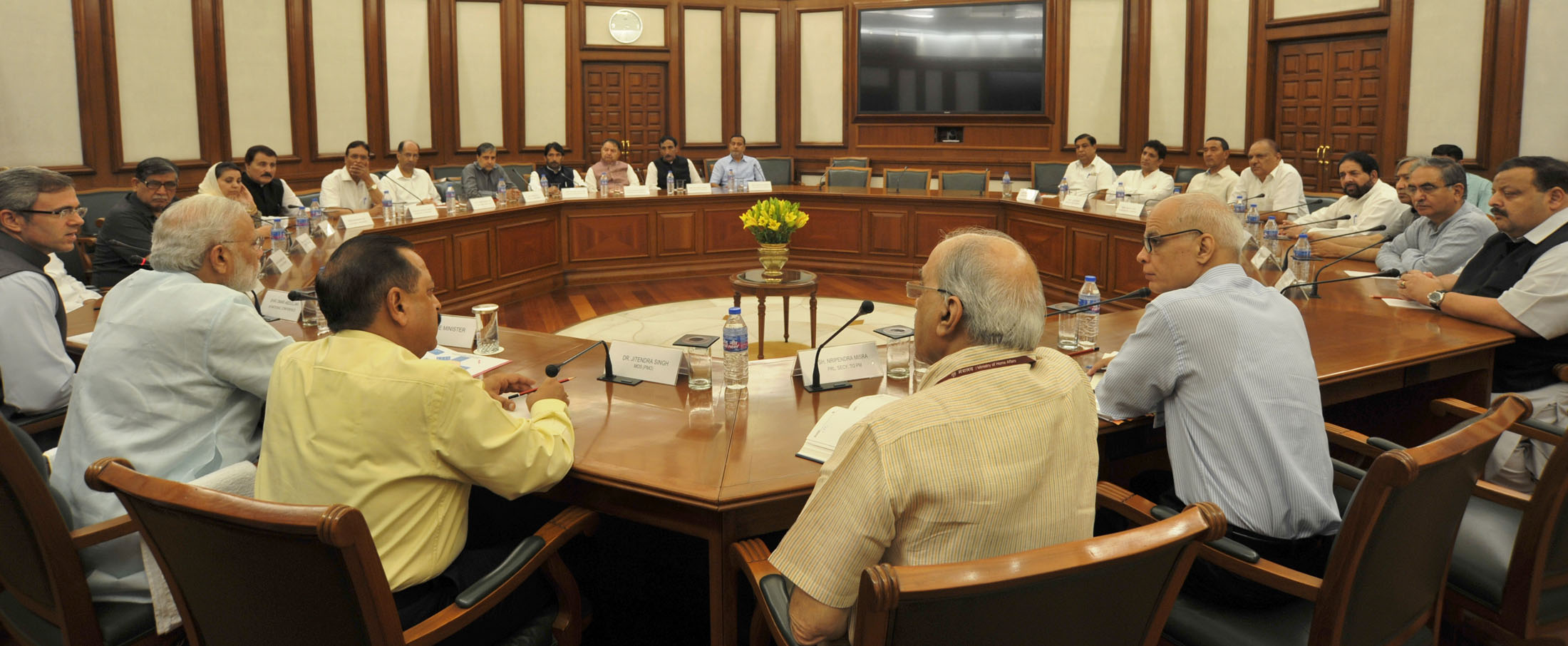
PM Narendra Modi with delegation of leaders from Jammu and Kashmir Opposition Parties on 22 August 2016

On 19 August 2016, former Chief Minister of Kashmir, Farooq Abdullah stated that Indian forces were "unleashing a reign of terror in Kashmir" that would damage India's global reputation. On the same day, the General Officer Commanding-in-Chief of India's Northern Command reached out to separatist leaders, stating that their help was required to restore normalcy in the region. In addition, a delegation consisting of opposition parties met the President and requested him initiate a political dialogue with all stakeholders and to acknowledge it as a political issue. They requested that the President end the use of lethal force against civilians. They claimed that instead of the government, the opposition parties were taking steps to restore calm. The delegation met the Prime Minister on 22 August, submitting a memorandum in which it demanded that the central government ban the use of pellet guns and start a political dialogue with all stakeholders to end the unrest. During the meeting, Modi asked all political parties work together to find a "permanent and lasting" solution.

Janata Dal (United) on 21 August advised that the Prime Minister or Home Minister lead an all-party delegation to the region. Arun Jaitley on 21 August labeled stone-throwers as attackers, while blaming Pakistan for the unrest and rejected any compromise with people indulging in violence.

The Home Minister visited Kashmir on 24 August. On the first day, he reviewed the security situation in a meeting attended by top Army, police and state officials. He met with delegations of several political parties, most of which demanded resumption of talks initiation talks with separatists. There was also a near unanimous consensus supporting a ban on pellet guns. The meeting was boycotted by many trade bodies of the state. Singh also met with state Governor N. N. Vohra who briefed him about the internal security situation and steps needed to restore normalcy.

The next day, the state's Chief Minister held a press meet along with Singh that she stormed out of after getting upset over allegations of her government's disproportionate use of force. Singh promised to look into alternatives to pellet guns and also stated that he is willing to talk with separatists. Meeting with Modi over the unrest on 27 August, Mufti called for creating interlocutors to hold talks with all stakeholders and blamed Pakistan for fuelling the unrest. The next day, Modi said that unity and compassion were the "twin mantras" for solving the Kashmir issue and criticized those inciting youth to violence saying they will have to answer to them someday. He deplored the loss of life, saying that the loss of anyone's life was a loss for the whole country and they should do whatever it takes to restore peace in the region. On the same day, Mufti said that talks should be held with anyone willing to reject violence and restore peace. Mufti also stated the format of dialogue needs to improve. She criticized people instigating the youth to violence. An all-party delegation agreed to visit Kashmir on 4 September. The delegation was to be led by R. Singh. During a press conference with US Secretary of Defense Ash Carter on 30 August, Indian Defense Minister Manohar Parrikar stated that a small percentage of demonstrators were holding the majority "at ransom".

The delegation that arrived on 4 September met various representatives. The separatists refused to meet, despite Mufti's invitation. A National Conference delegation stated that the unrest in Kashmir was due to Kashmiris' sense of alienation arising from the Union government's unjust behavior in the name of the national interest. Some members of the delegation tried to meet separatist leaders, but only Mirwaiz Umar Farooq was willing to talk, briefly, with All India Majlis-e-Ittehadul Muslimeen leader Asaduddin Owaisi. According to Owaisi, Farooq told him that the separatists rejected talks because the government was not serious about political dialogue. R. Singh criticized the separatists for this refusal, saying they did not believe in Kashmiriyat, Insaniyat (humanity) and Jamhooriyat (democracy). The all-party delegation disbanded on 5 September, after meeting with over 30 delegations (300+ members) representing various sections of Kashmiri society.

21 Sufi clerics met Singh on 6 September and requested his permission to carry out an Aman Yatra in Kashmir and hold talks with the locals. The clerics stated that no dialogue should be held with separatists and that Pakistan was behind the unrest. On 7 September, the delegation that had visited Kashmir asked the Central government to hold talks, while rejecting compromise on national sovereignty. On 10 September, the National Conference expressed regrets over protesters' deaths. It accused the Chief Minister of the State as insensitive and ruthless.

On 11 September, R. Singh directed the security forces to crack down on those who were instigating the youth in the region.

==== Reports ====
In March 2017, India Today, after an investigation, reported that the stone-pelters stated they were paid for protesting but did not disclose their identity. India Today interviewed five protesters who confessed on camera that they are paid Rs 5,000-Rs 7,000 a month and were provided with clothes and shoes. One claimed that separate funds were given for making petrol bombs.

In April 2017, a report by Indian Intelligence Bureau (IB) stated that an uprising was planned by Pakistan before July 2016, and that Wani's encounter helped the Pakistan Inter-Services Intelligence (ISI) ignite rebellion. The report said that ISI supplied Rs 800 crore to Kashmiri separatist leaders including Syed Ali Shah Geelani and Asiya Andrabi. The report stated that ISI's funds were used to pay off stone-pelters and petrol bomb throwers, and also to propagate anti-India and anti-security forces sentiments.

==== Others ====
An Indian Army veteran penned an open letter in mid-July, stating that Wani would have died even if he managed to escape as he was a terrorist and all those who conspired to take away Kashmir from India would be met with an iron hand.

South Asia director of Human Rights Watch, Meenakshi Ganguly, said that stone-pelting does not give the police a "free pass" to use force. She pointed out that the main grievance of the protestors was the authorities' failure to ensure human rights. Writer Arundhati Roy asked for an honest conversation about what kind of azadi (freedom) the Kashmiris are demanding.

Panun Kashmir, an organisation for displaced Kashmiri Pandits said on 22 July that the union government should recognise the "fundamentalist upsurge" and asked it to take immediate steps to prevent Kashmir from becoming an "Islamist-controlled territory". It also demanded that the government publish a report detailing attacks on Kashmiri Hindus.

Hurriyat chairman Syed Ali Shah Geelani on 16 July wrote to several international bodies and Heads of States, outlining six measures: offer self-determination, demilitarize the valley, repeal AFSPA and the Public Safety Act, release all political prisoners in Kashmir, restore their right to political activity, allow all international human rights and humanitarian organizations to work in the state and ensurw free political space to all parties.

A Facebook spat erupted in August 2016 over the unrest between Ruveda Salam, Kashmir's first woman Indian Police Service officer, and Harmeet Singh Mehta, the SP of Sopore after the former criticized the PDP.

In a video that went viral on 15 March, Hizbul Mujahideen commander Zakir Rashid Bhat asked the stone-pelters to attack the security forces for the supremacy of Islam, but not to fall for nationalism. In the video he stated that he observed that the protesters were mostly fighting for nationalism which Islam did not permit. He criticized the separatist leaders and threatened the local police as well as police informers.

=== Pakistan ===
On 11 July, Pakistan's Prime Minister Nawaz Sharif in a statement expressed "shock" over the killing of Burhan Wani and other civilians. He said that it was "deplorable that excessive and unlawful force was used against the civilians". The Indian government responded by saying that the Pakistan government's view on Wani's killing reflected its association with terrorism and advised it to refrain from interfering in India's internal affairs. On 13 July, Pakistan's Chief of Army Staff Raheel Sharif condemned the killings.

Sharif declared Wani to be a martyr on 15 July and said that 19 July would be held as a "black day" to express solidarity with Kashmiri people. The Indian Ministry of External Affairs criticised Pakistan for glorifying individuals belonging to proscribed terrorist organisations. Observance of the "black day" was postponed by Pakistan's government to 20 July while 19 July was instead observed as "Kashmir's Accession Day" to Pakistan.

A rally called Kashmir Caravan organised by Jamaat-ud-Dawa (JuD) and led by Hafiz Saeed was launched on 19 July at Lahore in support of the Kashmiri people. Members of various religious organisations re expected to join the rally. The rally's first phase was in Pakistan's capital Islamabad. During the second phase reached Muzaffarabad and Chakothi. In the third phase, the rally planned to cross into Jammu and Kashmir. All government officials were directed to wear black arm bands and prayers for Kashmiris were held during the afternoon. In addition, all diplomatic missions of Pakistan were scheduled to hold special ceremonies to highlight the issue and overseas Pakistanis would hold demonstrations outside offices of United Nations around the world. In a special message, Sharif said that India had no option but to accept "defeat" in front of the "freedom wave" in Kashmir.

Sharif declared that Pakistan would approach the United Nations Human Rights Council on behalf of itself and Organisation of Islamic Cooperation to request it to send a fact-finding team over the killings of civilians in Kashmir and banning the use of pellet guns. Pakistan's Ambassador to the United Nations Maleeha Lodhi met with UN officials on 19 July. She briefed them on Kashmir and forwarded letters by Adviser to the Prime Minister on Foreign Affairs Sartaj Aziz, who raised the issue of civilian deaths and said that Kashmiris fundamental human rights had been violated.

A JuD official reported on 25 July that a 30-member medical team of its Muslim Medical Mission would apply for visas to India in order to treat the injured Kashmiri civilians and would seek help of Pakistan's government in getting the visas. The mission's president threatened to hold demonstrations if the Indian government denied its visas. The Indian Embassy in Islamabad did not allow the team to enter its premises when they went there on 26 July. The team then applied through the Internet and courier. A caravan of the JuD bringing relief material was stopped on 2 August by Pakistani security forces at Chakothi. The organisation declared that they would not leave unless India accepted the relief material.

On 1 August, the Parliament of Pakistan unanimously passed a resolution criticising the alleged human rights violations in Kashmir and demanded the UNHRC investigate it. On 3 August, ahead of the SAARC Interior Ministers' Conference, Sharif called the situation "a new wave of freedom movement," and said, "The Kashmiri youth are writing new chapters of sacrifices to get the right to self determination." On 6 August, Pakistan's government offered medical treatment to those injured requested the international community to ask the Indian government to allow it to treat injured Kashmiris which was rejected by the Indian government. On 26 August, Sartaj Aziz met ambassadors of United Nations Security Council and European Union. In the meeting, he briefed the ambassadors about the "killings and human rights violations".

On 1 September, Foreign Office Spokesperson Nafees Zakariya stated that Sharif had written another letter to Ban Ki-moon alleging the situation in Kashmir was deteriorating and requested a fact-finding mission to probe alleged human rights violations. On 6 September, Awais Leghari one of 22 members of parliament selected to highlight the situation, briefed the presidents of Human Rights Council and International Committee of the Red Cross over the alleged human rights violations and attacked India's use of pellet guns. On 7 September, General Raheel Sharif stated that the solution for the Kashmir issue lay in heeding the Kashmiris and respecting their aspirations, not in shooting at them.

On 13 September 2016, Sharif dedicated Eid al-Adha to "sacrifices of Kashmiris" and stated that their voices could not be suppressed through force. President of Pakistan Mamnoon Hussain stated that Kashmiris were attacked for their demands of self-determination and Pakistanis must support them. During his speech at the United Nations General Assembly on 21 September, Sharif highlighted Wani as a symbol of the latest "Kashmiri Intifada" while calling for an independent inquiry into the alleged extrajudicial killings committed by Indian security forces in Kashmir.

On 30 May 2017, the Punjab Assembly unanimously adopted a resolution demanding that Pakistan's federal government immediately take the Kashmir issue to the United Nations.

=== United Nations ===
United Nations Secretary General Ban conveyed his concern over Kashmir and called for maximum restraint from all parties. He offered to mediate between India and Pakistan, provided both countries agreed. UNHRC requested the Indian government to let it visit Kashmir to investigate the alleged human rights abuses. The request was rejected, calling the request interference in the country's internal affairs. On 17 August, United Nations' High Commissioner for Human Rights Prince Zeid bin Ra'ad appealed to the Indian and Pakistani governments to allow access. On 12 August, Ban responded to a letter from Sharif, stating: "I deplore the loss of life and hope that all efforts will be made to avoid further violence... The United Nations remains convinced that it is only through dialogue that the outstanding issues between Pakistan and India, including on Kashmir, can be addressed."

=== United States ===
The US Department of State briefed the media on 12 and 14 July, stating that the United States was concerned about the violence in Jammu & Kashmir and that the US government was in touch with India and Pakistan.

Sharif met Secretary of State John Kerry in September, and expressed their "strong concern" over the violence, particularly the attack on an army base in Uri. The official State Department press release mentioned that Kerry reiterated the need for Pakistan to prevent terrorists from using Pakistani territory as safe havens, while commending recent efforts by Pakistani security forces to counter extremist violence.

=== European Union ===
In a statement on 28 July, the European Union expressed its condolences to those killed and injured while urging calm and law and order, further urging India and Pakistan to involve people of Kashmir in the dialogue.

=== Organization of Islamic Cooperation ===
In July 2016, the Organization of Islamic Cooperation's (OIC) Independent Permanent Human Rights Commission expressed concern over alleged human rights violations. In August, OIC's secretary-general Iyad bin Amin Madani said human rights violations in Kashmir were "not an internal matter of the Indian state", adding: "The international community should raise its voice against the atrocities in India-held Kashmir... The situation in Kashmir is heading towards a referendum. No one should be afraid of a referendum and the solution should be through the United Nations resolutions."

On 19 September, the OIC's contact group on Kashmir met at the 71st session of the UN General Assembly. Amin again expressed concerns and called for an immediate settlement in accordance with wishes of Kashmiri people and United Nations Security Council resolutions, while calling on India to immediately stop committing atrocities in Kashmir. Turkey emphasised the need to resolve the dispute, while Azerbaijan called on the OIC to explore "innovative means to highlight the human rights violations" occurring in Kashmir.

=== China ===
China expressed concern over the casualties and called for a proper settlement of the Kashmiri issue through peaceful means. Pakistani media reports claimed that Prime Minister Li Keqiang assured his country's support to Pakistan. The statement added, "We support Pakistan and will speak for Pakistan at every forum." Li encouraged Pakistan and India to de-escalate tensions . China's official press release on a meeting between Keqiang and Sharif made no mention of Kashmir.

=== Turkey ===
Turkey backed Pakistan's position of sending a team from the Organisation of Islamic Cooperation to probe the alleged human rights violations, expressing hopes that the Kashmir issue would be resolved through dialogue.

=== Italy ===
Pakistani media reports claimed that Italy's defence minister Roberta Pinotti (while visiting Pakistan) said India's use of force was "unbearable", and that Italy would apprise the international community concerning the situation. However, Italy's official press release made no mention of Kashmir.

=== Belarus ===
A press release by Pakistan government mentioned that Belarusian President Alexander Lukashenko during his visit to Islamabad in October 2016, exchanged views on Kashmir with Sharif. The two delegations released a joint statement underlining the "need for resolution of all outstanding issues between Pakistan and India including the Jammu and Kashmir dispute through peaceful means and in accordance with UN Security Council resolutions". However, the official press release by Office of President of Belarus made no mention of Kashmir or UN resolutions.

=== Amnesty International ===
Amnesty International accused Indian security forces of using "arbitrary and excessive force" to deal with the protests. It stated that their actions were a violation of international standards and were worsening the human rights crisis. The organisation criticised the use of pellet guns. It called for a ban, and also expressed concern at the deployment of PAVA shells as they could be used in an "arbitrary or indiscriminate manner". Following a seminar on human rights abuses in Kashmir, the group was accused of sedition in India.

=== Human Rights Watch ===
In July, Human Rights Watch (HRW) urged Indian authorities to credibly and impartially investigate the use of lethal force. HRW's South Asia Director Meenakshi Ganguly criticized India for previously ignoring "the finding of abuses under the draconian Armed Forces Special Powers Act". Later in October, HRW urged Indian authorities to end arbitrary detentions.

=== Pellet guns ===
Amnesty International asked the Indian government to end the use of pellet guns. On 4 August, Amnesty International India called for such a ban following the death of a third person.

In response to pellet gun-related casualties, R. Singh announced that a panel would be set up to look for alternatives. During a visit to Kashmir, he asked security forces to avoid using pellet guns as much as possible. The Director-General of Central Reserve Police Force, K. Durga Prasad, in a statement issued on 25 July, regretted the injuries to Kashmiri civilians, but said that they were the least lethal option available and assured that they would only be used in extreme situations. Lieutenant general D. S. Hooda, chief of the Northern Command of the Indian Army, supported his claim. Prasad's comments were criticised by Congress leaders Ghulam Nabi Azad and Amarinder Singh as well as Mohammed Yousuf Tarigami, the state chief of CPI-M.

The Jammu and Kashmir High Court on 23 July advised the government to discontinue the use of pellet guns. On 26 July, the court required the Union Government to report on the use of the guns. It asked the government to only allow trained personnel to use them, while looking into other means of crowd-control. The High Court issued notices to the state and Union government asking them to file a response to a petition seeking to ban the guns. Deputy Chief Minister Nirmal Singh ruled out a ban on the weapons, stating they were only used in extreme situations. The army recommended the use of sound cannons, pepper shotguns and chilli grenades instead of pellet guns.

In an affidavit filed before the court on 17 August, CRPF told the court that the guns were only used in extreme situations and their withdrawal would force CRPF personnel to resort to the use of rifles, which might increase fatalities. The government-appointed panel submitted its report on 29 August, reportedly recommending nonivamide (PAVA) shells, stun lac shells and Long Range Acoustic Devices. It was reported that a ban on pellet guns was ruled out, but the use of weapons would be limited only to the "rarest of rare" cases. On 3 September, R. Singh approved PAVA shells as a replacement.

On 6 September, the state government justified the use of pellet guns before the state's high court, stating they were a modern method to deal with violent protesters and contended that a court could not specify how situations were to be handled. It claimed that pellet guns were not compatible with the Standard Operating Procedure of firing below the knees as the pellets spread to a diameter of 6 metres. On 10 September, V.K. Singh, former chief of Indian Army, supported the use of pellet guns stating they were non-lethal and were a "sensible and well-thought" alternative. On 21 September, the state High Court rejected the ban petition, stating that the use of force was inevitable as long as unruly mobs were violent.

In February 2017, CRPF introduced deflectors as a modification for its pellet guns.

== See also ==
- 2008 Kashmir unrest
- 2010 Kashmir unrest
- 2017 Srinagar by-election
- 2019 Kashmir lockdown
