= K. V. Ramachandran =

- Born: Coimbatore and Madras
- Education: University of California – Los Angeles
- Known for: Music and art critic

K.V. Ramachandran (1898–1956) of Coimbatore and Madras was a 20th-century Indian music and art critic. He had a reputation for being extremely opinionated and influential, and people who knew him recall that he instilled fear in musicians, dancers and artists around the country. In addition to books, his writings were featured in The Hindu, India's national newspaper, and the Journal of the Music Academy.

Ramachandran developed and produced Kesavardhini hair oil. His wife and daughters continued to run the company in Chennai after his death.

He was a collector of rare, antique Indian artwork and instruments including the dilrupa. He was a friend and colleague of the Canadian composer and ethnomusicologist Colin McPhee, and their correspondence on Indian music can be found in the McPhee Collection at the University of California – Los Angeles Ethnomusicology Archive.

Ramachandran edited and brought out a magazine Shilpasree devoted to Bharatanatyam, music and fine arts.

Ramachandran died in Coimbatore on 26 March 1956. His eldest daughter, Seetha Rajagopal lives in Madras. All his other daughters have died (Shyamala, Gowri, Bapu). As of 2007, his grandchildren and their children lived in various locations around the globe, including Switzerland, the U.S., New Zealand, Canada and India.
