= Watter Khani =

Watter Khani Water Khani
- Village
- Nickname: WatterKhaai
- Location in Jammu and Kashmir, India
- Coordinates: 34.4775499°N 74.2968715°E
- Country: India
- Union Territory: Jammu and Kashmir
- District: Kupwara

Population (2011)
  - Total: 969

Languages
  - Official: Kashmiri, Urdu, Hindi, Dogri, English
- Time zone: UTC+5:30 (IST)
- PIN: 193222
- Vehicle registration: JK-09

Watter Khani is a village in Kupwara district of the Indian union territory of Jammu and Kashmir. The village is located at a distance of 7 kilometres (4.3 mi) from district headquarters Kupwara town.

== Demographics ==
According to the 2011 census of India, Watter Khani has 152 households. The literacy rate of Watter Khani was 64.49% compared to 67.16% of Jammu and Kashmir. In Watter Khani, Male literacy stands at 35.29% while the female literacy rate was 29.20%.

Demographics (2011 Census)
	Total	Male	Female
Population	969	481	488
Children aged below 6 years	134	68	66
Scheduled caste	0	0	0
Scheduled tribe	0	0	0
Literacy	64.49%	35.29%	29.20%
Workers (all)	199	183	16
Main workers (all)	120	9	11
Marginal workers (total)	79	74	5

== Transport ==
=== Road ===
Watter Khani is connected by road with other places in Jammu and Kashmir and India through NH 701.

=== Rail ===
The nearest railway stations to Watter Khani are Sopore railway station and Baramulla railway station both located at a distance of 40.5 kilometres from Watter Khani.

=== Air ===
The nearest airport is Srinagar International Airport located at a distance of 90 kilometres.

== See also ==
- Trehgam
- Kigam
- Wavoora
- Lolab Valley
- Gurez
- Tulail Valley
