= Kigam =

Kigam Kegam
- Town
- Location in Jammu and Kashmir, India
- Coordinates: 34.422932°N 74.274086°E
- Country: India
- Union Territory: Jammu and Kashmir
- District: Kupwara

Population (2011)
  - Total: 6,179

Languages
  - Official: Kashmiri, Urdu, Hindi, Dogri, English
- Time zone: UTC+5:30 (IST)
- PIN: 193221
- Vehicle registration: JK-09

Kigam is a village in Kupwara district of the Indian union territory of Jammu and Kashmir. The village is located at a distance of 9 kilometres (5.6 mi) from district headquarters Kupwara town.

== Demographics ==
According to the 2011 census of India, Watter Khani has 455 households. The literacy rate of Kigam was 67.55% compared to 67.16% of Jammu and Kashmir. In Kigam, Male literacy stands at 87.54% while the female literacy rate was 12.46%.

Demographics (2011 Census)
	Total	Male	Female
Population	6179	3654	520
Children aged below 6 years	916	479	437
Scheduled caste	128	128	0
Scheduled tribe	279	166	113
Literacy	64.49%	35.29%	29.20%
Workers (all)	3,641	3,388	253
Main workers (all)	3,085	3,064	21
Marginal workers (total)	556	324	232

== Transport ==
=== Road ===
Kigam is connected by road with other places in Jammu and Kashmir and India through NH 701.

=== Rail ===
The nearest railway stations to Kigam are Sopore railway station and Baramulla railway station both located at a distance of 30.03 kilometres from Kigam.

=== Air ===
The nearest airport is Srinagar International Airport located at a distance of 81.8 kilometres.

== See also ==
- Watter Khani
- Trehgam
- Wavoora
- Lolab Valley
- Gurez
- Tulail Valley
