= Yigoban =

- Village
- Location in Jammu and Kashmir, India Yigoban (India)
- Coordinates: 34.759°N 74.391°E
- Country: India
- Union Territory: Jammu and Kashmir
- District: Kupwara

Languages
  - Official: Kashmiri, Hindi, Urdu, Dogri, English
- Time zone: UTC+5:30 (IST)
- PIN: 193222

Yigoban is a village in Machil valley in northern part of Kupwara district of the Indian union territory of Jammu and Kashmir.

Yigoban

== Transport ==
Yigoban, near the India-Pakistan Line of Control, is reachable by a motorable road.

Machil Pass Tunnel (Zamindar Gali Tunnel or Z-Gali Tunnel), is planned under the Machil Pass (also called the Zamindar Gali or Z-Gali). Pass, at an elevation of 3,150 metres (10,334 feet) above sea level, lies on the Sh Shamsbari mountain range in the high-altitude fringes of the northwestern Himalayas. It separates the main Kashmir valley from the remote Machil Valley (Machil Sector). Union Minister for Road Transport and Highways Nitin Gadkari has approved the proposed tunnels at Razdan Pass and Machil Pass to be taken up under the Other Than Capital Acquisition (OTCA).

== See also ==
- Tunnels in North West India
- Lolab Valley
- Tulail Valley
