= Abdul Haq Khan (advocate) =

Indian politician

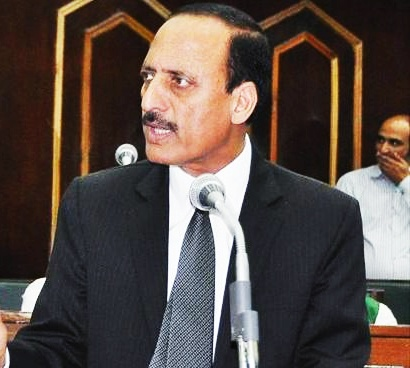

Member of Jammu and Kashmir Legislative Assembly
- In office 2008–2018

Personal details
- Born: 10 March 1950 (age 76) Diver Anderbugh Lolab Valley, Kupwara
- Party: Jammu and Kashmir Peoples Democratic Party
- Occupation: Politician
- Website: jkpdp.org

Abdul Haq Khan is a Kashmiri politician, lawyer, and former Minister for Rural Development Department and Panchayati Raj and Law & Justice, Jammu and Kashmir under PDP-BJP coalition government. He was Member of Legislative Assembly representing Lolab constituency at the Jammu and Kashmir Legislative Assembly from January 2009 to November 2018. He is associated with Jammu and Kashmir Peoples Democratic Party.

Abdul Haq Khan was born in Diver Anderbugh village of Lolab Valley. He has studied B.A. LLB from Kashmir University which he completed in 1977.

In 2014 Assembly elections, Khan was elected for the second time by defeating Qaiser Jamsheed Lone of National Conference by a margin of 2870 votes.

Khan is a critic of the liquor trend in Kashmir.

On 6 January 2019 when his security was withdrawn by the Government, Khan blamed BJP for the same.

In November, 2022 Khan disassociated himself from the PDP and political affairs in general due to health issues. However, Khan rejoined the PDP in August 2024 shortly before the assembly elections. During General Election to Legislative Assembly of Jammu and Kashmir 2024 Khan's son Waqar - ul - Haq Khan replaced him as a candidate for Lolab assembly segment as Khan developed severe health issues and survived a heart attack, but he lost.
