= Tekipora =

Village in India

Teki Pora Tekipor Tekipora
- Village
- Location in Jammu and Kashmir, India Teki Pora (India)
- Coordinates: 34.4671°N 74.4265°E
- Country: India
- Union territory: Jammu and Kashmir
- District: Kupwara

Area
  - Total: 515.2 ha (1,273 acres)
- Elevation: 1,715 m (5,627 ft)

Population (2011)
  - Total: 7,437
  - Density: 1,444/km^{2} (3,739/sq mi)

Languages
  - Official: Kashmiri, Urdu, Hindi, Dogri, English
- Time zone: UTC+5:30 (IST)
- PIN: 193223
- Vehicle registration: JK-09

Teki Pora, commonly known as Tekipor, is a village in Kupwara district of Jammu and Kashmir, India. The village is 25 km (16 mi) away from Kupwara.

== Demographics ==
As of the 2011 Census of India, Teki Pora village has a total population of 7,437 people including 3,711 males and 3,726 females. The literacy rate of the Teki Pora village is 49.97%.
