= Gulgam =

Village in India

- Village
- Location in Jammu and Kashmir, India Gulgam (India)
- Coordinates: 34.4711°N 74.1378°E
- Country: India
- Union territory: Jammu and Kashmir
- District: Kupwara

Area
  - Total: 551.6 ha (1,363 acres)

Population (2011)
  - Total: 9,679
  - Density: 1,755/km^{2} (4,545/sq mi)

Languages
  - Official: Kashmiri, Urdu, Hindi, Dogri, English
- Time zone: UTC+5:30 (IST)
- PIN: 193222
- Vehicle registration: JK-09

Gulgam is a village in Kupwara district, and the Indian union territory of Jammu and Kashmir. The village is 6 km (3.7 mi) away from Kupwara. There are 119 scheduled tribes persons of which 55 are females and 64 are males. Females constitute 46.22% and males constitute 53.78% of the scheduled tribes population. Scheduled tribes constitute 1.23% of the total population.

Population density of Gulgam is 1754.71 persons per square kilometer.

== Demographics ==
As of the 2011 Census of India, Gulgam village has a total population of 9,679 people including 4,944 males and 4,735 females. The literacy rate of the village is 49.40%. Male literate population is 2773, while female literate population is 2008.
