= Lolab Assembly constituency =

Constituency of the Jammu and Kashmir legislative assembly in India

Coordinates: 34.50°N 74.38°E

Lolab
- Constituency No. 4 for the Jammu and Kashmir Legislative Assembly

Constituency details
- Country: India
- State: Jammu and Kashmir
- District: Kupwara
- Lok Sabha constituency: Baramulla
- Established: 1962

Member of Legislative Assembly
- Incumbent Qaysar Jamshaid Lone
- Party: Jammu and Kashmir National Conference
- Elected year: 2024

Lolab Assembly constituency is one of the 90 constituencies in the Jammu and Kashmir Legislative Assembly of Jammu and Kashmir a north state of India. Lolab Valley is also part of Baramulla Lok Sabha constituency.

== Members of the Legislative Assembly ==
Election	Member	Party
1962	Ghulam Nabi Wani	Jammu & Kashmir National Conference
1967	Ghulam Nabi Wani	Indian National Congress
1972	Saif Ullah Bhat	Indian National Congress
1996	Mushtaq Ahmad Lone	Jammu & Kashmir National Conference
2002	Qaysar Jamshaid Lone	Jammu & Kashmir National Conference
2008	Abdul Haq Khan	Jammu and Kashmir People's Democratic Party
2014	Abdul Haq Khan	Jammu and Kashmir People's Democratic Party
2024	Qaysar Jamshaid Lone	Jammu and Kashmir National Conference

== Election results ==
=== Assembly Election 2024 ===
2024 Jammu and Kashmir Legislative Assembly election : Lolab
Party	Candidate	Votes	%	±%
JKNC	Qaysar Jamshaid Lone	19,603	33.03%	New
Independent	Dawood Bashir Bhat	11,732	19.77%	New
JKPDP	Waqar Ul Haq Khan	10,508	17.71%	▼23.36
Independent	Haji Farooq Ahmad Mir	6,292	10.60%	New
JKPC	Mudasir Akbar Shah	4,095	6.90%	▲1.34
DPAP	Muneer Ahmad Mir	2,998	5.05%	New
Independent	Nazir Ahmad	974	1.64%	New
NOTA	None of the Above	1,220	2.06%	▲0.35
Margin of victory		7,871	13.26%	▲9.26
Turnout		59,344	65.65%	▼5.93
Registered electors		90,392		▼9.65
JKNC gain from JKPDP		Swing	▼8.03	

=== Assembly Election 2014 ===
2014 Jammu and Kashmir Legislative Assembly election : Lolab
Party	Candidate	Votes	%	±%
JKPDP	Abdul Haq Khan	29,408	41.06%	▲0.39
JKNC	Qaysar Jamshaid Lone	26,538	37.06%	▲5.70
INC	Haji Farooq Ahmad Mir	7,629	10.65%	▲2.95
JKPC	Abdul Rehman Wani	3,981	5.56%	New
BJP	Abdul Rashid Zargar	1,092	1.52%	New
RPI	Suriaya Bano	765	1.07%	New
All J & K Kisan Majdoor Party	Mohammad Sultan Magray	458	0.64%	New
NOTA	None of the Above	1,222	1.71%	New
Margin of victory		2,870	4.01%	▼5.31
Turnout		71,617	71.58%	▲3.43
Registered electors		1,00,045		▲18.82
JKPDP hold		Swing	▲0.39	

=== Assembly Election 2008 ===
2008 Jammu and Kashmir Legislative Assembly election : Lolab
Party	Candidate	Votes	%	±%
JKPDP	Abdul Haq Khan	23,337	40.67%	▲37.50
JKNC	Qaysar Jamshaid Lone	17,990	31.35%	▼10.91
INC	Farooq Ahmad Mir	4,417	7.70%	▲3.71
Independent	Abdul Rehman Wani	4,087	7.12%	New
BSP	Mohammed Maqbool Shah	3,265	5.69%	New
Independent	Maha Wali Khan	1,566	2.73%	New
JKANC	Barkat Ali Khan	1,195	2.08%	New
Margin of victory		5,347	9.32%	▲3.46
Turnout		57,382	68.15%	▲21.27
Registered electors		84,198		▲15.79
JKPDP gain from JKNC		Swing	▼1.59	

=== Assembly Election 2002 ===
2002 Jammu and Kashmir Legislative Assembly election : Lolab
Party	Candidate	Votes	%	±%
JKNC	Qaysar Jamshaid Lone	14,408	42.26%	▲5.00
Independent	Abdul Haq Khan	12,412	36.41%	New
LJP	Mushtaq Ahmad Wani	1,473	4.32%	New
INC	Ghulam Mohi-U-Din Dar	1,361	3.99%	▼16.75
JKNPP	Lal Din Plote	1,115	3.27%	▼9.99
JKPDP	Khazir Mohammed Ganai	1,082	3.17%	New
Independent	Mohammed Sarfaraz	863	2.53%	New
Margin of victory		1,996	5.85%	▼2.68
Turnout		34,093	46.89%	▲4.87
Registered electors		72,715		▲19.16
JKNC hold		Swing	▲5.00	

=== Assembly Election 1996 ===
1996 Jammu and Kashmir Legislative Assembly election : Lolab
Party	Candidate	Votes	%	±%
JKNC	Mushtaq Ahmad Lone	9,554	37.26%	New
JD	Abdul Rahim Wani	7,367	28.73%	New
INC	Ch. Jalah-Ud-Din	5,318	20.74%	▼32.53
JKNPP	Ghulam Mohi-Ud-Din	3,399	13.26%	New
Margin of victory		2,187	8.53%	▼12.87
Turnout		25,638	43.82%	▼20.63
Registered electors		61,022		▲116.09
JKNC gain from INC		Swing	▼16.01	

=== Assembly Election 1972 ===
1972 Jammu and Kashmir Legislative Assembly election : Lolab
Party	Candidate	Votes	%	±%
INC	Saif Ullah Bhat	9,424	53.28%	New
Independent	Nabi Shah	5,638	31.87%	New
Independent	Abdul Rasheed Mir	1,379	7.80%	New
JI	Mohammed Yousef	720	4.07%	New
Independent	Subhan Joowani	528	2.98%	New
Margin of victory		3,786	21.40%	
Turnout		17,689	65.38%	▲62.64
Registered electors		28,239		▲8.36
INC hold		Swing		

=== Assembly Election 1967 ===
1967 Jammu and Kashmir Legislative Assembly election : Lolab
Party	Candidate	Votes	%	±%
INC	Ghulam Nabi Wani	Unopposed		
Registered electors		26,060		▲5.12
INC gain from JKNC		Swing		

=== Assembly Election 1962 ===
1962 Jammu and Kashmir Legislative Assembly election : Lolab
Party	Candidate	Votes	%	±%
JKNC	Ghulam Nabi Wani	Unopposed		
Registered electors		24,790		
JKNC win (new seat)				

== See also ==
- Lolab Valley
- Kupwara district
- List of constituencies of Jammu and Kashmir Legislative Assembly
