= Drugmulla =

Village in Jammu and Kashmir, India

Drugmulla Drugmul
- Village
- Location in Jammu and Kashmir Drugmulla (India)
- Coordinates: 34.506°N 74.253°E
- Country: India
- Union Territory: Jammu and Kashmir
- District: Kupwara
- Tehsil: Drugmulla

Population (2011)
  - Total: 12,930

Languages
  - Official: Kashmiri, Urdu, Dogri, Hindi, English
  - Spoken: Kashmiri, Urdu
- Time zone: UTC+5:30 (IST)
- PIN: 193222
- Vehicle registration: JK-09
- Website: kupwara.nic.in

Drugmulla is a village and tehsil headquarter in Kupwara district of the Indian union territory of Jammu and Kashmir. It is located 5 kilometres from the district headquarters Kupwara.

== Demographics ==
According to the 2011 census of India, Drugmulla had 736 households. The literacy rate of Drugmulla town is 71.51%. The male literacy stands at 82.73% while the female literacy rate was 54.73%.

Demographics (2011 Census)
	Total	Male	Female
Population	12930	7665	5265
Children aged below 6 years	2394	1353	1041
Scheduled caste	8	8	0
Scheduled tribe	724	368	356
Literacy	71.51%	82.73%	54.73%
Workers (all)	4025	3729	296
Main workers (all)	2841	2691	150
Marginal workers (total)	1184	1038	146

=== Education ===
Some of the institutions of Drugmulla Village which provide quality education to the students of Drugmulla and other areas of the district:

1. UPS Bandpora Drugmulla
2. Iqbal Memorial Dugmulla
3. Imperial Drugmulla
4. Alfayaz Public School
5. IDPS Drugmula, Kupwara.

== Transportation ==
=== Air ===
The nearest airport is Srinagar International Airport, 88 kilometres or a two and a half an hour drive away.

=== Rail ===
The nearest railway stations are Baramulla railway station and Sopore railway station, located 42 and 50 kilometres from Drugmulla respectively. There are plans to connect Drugmulla by rail by extending the Jammu–Baramulla line to Kupwara which will pass through Drugmulla.

=== Road ===
Drugmulla is well-connected by road to other towns and villages in Jammu and Kashmir and the rest of India by the Sopore-Kupwara Road and Drugmulla-Kupwara Road. The NH 701 passes through Drugmulla.

== See also ==
- Kupwara
- Jammu and Kashmir
- Handwara
- Karnah
