= Ashraf Sehrai =

Kashmiri separatist leader and chairman of Tehreek-e-Hurriyat

Chairman of Tehreek-e-Hurriyat
- In office 19 May 2018 – 5 May 2021
- Preceded by: Syed Ali Shah Geelani
- Succeeded by: Ameer Hamza Shah

Personal details
- Born: 1944 Tekipora, Baramulla district, Jammu and Kashmir, British India
- Died: 5 May 2021 (aged 76–77) Jammu, Jammu and Kashmir, India
- Citizenship: Indian
- Party: Jamaat-e-Islami Kashmir (1960–2006); Tehreek-e-Hurriyat (2004–2021)
- Children: 6
- Education: BA (Hons)
- Alma mater: Aligarh Muslim University

Mohammad Ashraf Khan (23 March 1944 – 5 May 2021), chiefly known as Ashraf Sehrai or just as Sehrai, was a Kashmiri separatist leader and chairman of Tehreek-e-Hurriyat, a Kashmiri separatist political party. He was elected chairman through a first-ever election conducted in the history of Hurriyat when Syed Ali Shah Geelani relinquished office due to his deteriorating health.

He had also served as general secretary and deputy chairperson of Jamaat-e-Islami Kashmir. He was later appointed the head of its political division.

== Life and background ==
Sehrai was born in 1944 in Tekipora village of Lolab Valley in Baramulla district (presently the village is part of the Kupwara district, separated from Baramulla in 1970s) of Jammu and Kashmir to Shams-ud-din Khan. His ancestors had migrated from areas now part of modern-day Pakistan to Jammu and Kashmir. He also had two elder brothers. One of them was Muhammad Yousuf Khan, one of the founders of Tehreek-e-Islami, who died in 2016. The other was Qamar-ud-din Khan, a renowned member of Jamaat-e-Islami in the Lolab area who died in 2009.

As a student, he used to show interest in the religious and political discussions. He also had an interest in poems and literature, authoring writings as well as poems, most of which were published in "Azaan" and "Tulu" magazines. He started publishing Tulu in 1969 from Sopore. Sehrai commissioned articles, took care of its design as well as printing and also wrote for the column called Safa-e-Pakistan which covered the events happening in Pakistan. He and Syed Ali Shah Geelani dedicated a special issue to Allama Iqbal in which they both wrote lengthy columns against Kashmiri socialists and a writer called Ashia Bhat while also defending the magazine and Jamaat-e-Islami, after the magazine's claim of Iqbal not being a socialist led to a controversy.

Sehrai completed his primary education in his hometown Tekipora and secondary education in Sogam Lolab High School in 1959. After clearing his secondary examination, he moved to Uttar Pradesh where he received a Bachelor of Arts (Hons) in Urdu from Aligarh Muslim University.

He was the father of six children, including four sons and two daughters. His sons are named Khalid Ashraf, Rashid Ashraf and Mujahid Ashraf. His youngest son Junaid Ashraf Khan became a militant in March 2018 by joining Hizbul Mujahideen.

Sehrai had stated that he never expected Junaid to become a militant, but would not request him to return. Junaid later became Hizbul's divisional commander, but was killed in an encounter with the CRPF & Jammu and Kashmir Police on 19 May 2020. Sehrai personally led his funeral prayers attended by about 300 people despite the lockdown due to the coronavirus pandemic.

== Political activities ==
Sehrai became an affiliate of Syed Ali Shah Geelani in 1959 after being encouraged to do so by his elder brother. He officially became a member as a "rukun" of Jamaat-e-Islami in 1960. Sehrai was jailed for the first time in 1965 over anti-government activities after he delivered a speech criticising Ghulam Mohammed Sadiq's government for repression of free speech and arrest of members of the Moh-e-Muqaddas Majlis-e-Amal. After he started focusing on the Tulu magazine, JeI cadres complained about him staying away from the activities of the organisation and the magazine was thus shut down in 1971.

In August 2003, JeI removed Geelani from the position of head of its political bureau after he started having differences with the moderate wing of All Parties Hurriyat Conference, and appointed Sehrai in his place. He too was however sacked from the position in March 2004 and his membership was also suspended for consorting with Geelani. After the JeI expelled Geelani following the formation of his own Hurriyat Conference party due to opposition to a dialogue with the central Indian government, Sehrai also left the group and was appointed as the general secretary of the Tehreek-e-Hurriyat in 2004 during its foundation. While his membership was later restored, the JeI again expelled him in 2006.

Following the 2016–2017 Kashmir unrest, the National Investigation Agency published a report to address his involvement in issuing protest calendars and carrying out anti-India activities.

He was appointed as the acting chairman by the Majlis-e-Shoora of Tehreek-e-Hurriyat on 19 March 2018. Later, he was elected as the chairman for 3 years on 19 August by a margin of 410 votes out of a total of 433, in the first-ever Hurriyat election since Geelani stepped down.

=== Detentions ===
Sehrai spent over sixteen years in various jails during his career. He was first arrested on 13 March 1965 for speaking against the arrests by the Prime Minister of Jammu and Kashmir Ghulam Mohammed Sadiq, who had ordered arrests of all those who participated in Sheikh Abdullah's boycott call against the Indian National Congress in Jammu and Kashmir. He was then subsequently jailed in Central Jail, Srinagar for over twenty months.

He was among the separatist leaders detained during the state-wide lockdown imposed after the revocation of special status of Jammu and Kashmir. Later in July 2020, he was arrested from Barzulla Baghat area of Srinagar by the Jammu and Kashmir Police under the Public Safety Act. He was imprisoned in the Kot Balwal jail in Jammu.

His family had submitted three applications to the high court requesting for his medical examination and treatment at Government Medical College, Srinagar or Jammu after he started falling ill, however his son Rashid alleged that the judge delayed the review of the submitted requests until his health deteriorated in jail week before he died in May.

The Jammu and Kashmir Prisons Department, according to The Wire wrote a letter to the Department of Home seeking for available resources in the jail for Sehrai's health condition, however jail officials didn't receive any reply to the submitted letter from the home department.

== Death ==
Sehrai had been arrested under the Jammu and Kashmir Public Safety Act in July 2020 and had been serving his sentence in Udhampur district jail. His health deteriorated on 4 May 2021 and he complained of breathlessness. He was subsequently admitted to the Government Medical College, Jammu and died on the next day in the hospital from COVID-19. Sehrai's family alleged that he was "murdered" by the authorities, while the Jammu and Kashmir High Court Bar Association alleged that his death was a "custodial murder".

Sehrai's body was handed over to his relatives in the evening of 5 May, after the completion of his autopsy. Only his family were allowed to attend his funeral on the next day, with his body being buried at his native village. His family alleged that they originally wanted to bury him at the "martyrs' graveyard" in Srinagar, but were forced to bury him in Tekipora by the police. His sons Mujahid and Rashid were arrested on 16 May for engaging in anti-India sloganeering at his funeral.

== See also ==
- Yasin Malik
- Asiya Andrabi
- Mirwaiz Umar Farooq
- Maqbool Bhat
- Operation Gibraltar
