= Bangus Valley =

High Altitude Meadow In Kashmir

- Location within Jammu and Kashmir Location within India
- Floor elevation: 3,012 m (9,882 ft)

Geography
- Location: Kupwara district, Jammu and Kashmir, India
- Coordinates: 34°22′52″N 74°04′12″E
- Interactive map of Bangus Valley

The Bangus Valley official name Bungus Valley is located in Kupwara District of Indian Administered Jammu and Kashmir. It is west of Handwara town. It is situated in the Pir Panjal range and is known for its breath-taking natural beauty, including snow-capped mountains, lush green forests, and crystal clear streams. It has got two ways, one from Kupwara side which is 42 kms away from main town Kupwara and other from handwara side which is 29 kms respectively. Both the roads are almost completed.

== Etymology ==
The term Bangus comes from sanskrit word Van (Forest) and gase (grass).

== Geography ==
Bangus is about 100 kilometres (62 mi) from Srinagar at an altitude of 10,000 feet (3,000 m). The principal valley is locally known as "Boud Bangus" (Big Bangus) and has an estimated area of about 300 square kilometers. It consists of a linear elliptical bowl aligned along the east–west axis and is surrounded by Rajwar and Mawar in the east, Shamasbury and Dajlungun Mountains in the west and Chowkibal and Karnah Guli in the north. Kazinag Range (up to 4,732 metres (15,525 ft) from sea level) in the south. A smaller valley known as "Lokut Bangus" (Small Bangus) lies on the north-eastern side of the main valley. Lashar valley is from North side of boud bangus and bidrun Top is favourite destination for trekkers. Bidrun Top is a one kilometre (0.62 mi) long steep trekking from Behak area. There are three routes to visit this place. The least distance route is from Handwara via Rajwar. The second route is also from Handwara but via Reshwari mawer. The third route from Kupwara via Chowkibal.The rajwar route is the latest one developed gives easy access to bungus valley as the road through this route is plain and offers no steep slopes or curves upto wadder payeen. Zachaldara being the tehsil on this route can serve the purpose of food and accommodation. The route via mawer and chowkibal kupwara are quite beautiful but long.

The valley is traversed by many small streams with nearly 14 tributaries, including the Roshan Kul, Tillwan Kul and Douda Kul. The water of these streams form one of the headwaters of the Kamil River which in turn joins the Lolab stream, thus forming the Pohru River.

== Flora and fauna ==
Bangus is replete with a diverse variety of flora and fauna. The meadows and the slopes of the side plateaus are covered with a range of flowers and medicinal plants. Fresh water fishes of moderate size and their fingerlings inhabit the streams. The valley's forests and plains serve as the breeding, feeding and protection grounds for many wild animal species. The wild life of includes about 50 species of animals and about 10 species of birds. The animal species include the musk deer, antelope, snow leopard, brown bear, black bear, monkeys, and red fox. A large number of residents and migratory birds can also be found feeding and breeding in the valley. The prominent resident birds include pheasants, tragopan, monal pheasant, black partridge, bush quail, and wild fowl.

== Tourism ==
Bangus has remained largely restricted and an unfavorable tourist spot due to the armed conflict that affects this area, and also due to the lack of infrastructure. However, efforts have been made to bring the valley on the tourist map. As of 2 June 2022, the road connectivity from Handwara side via Mawer is complete. People can take only small cars to Bangus because work on macadamisation is still going on. Vehicles are available on rent basis from Handwara market. Night stay tents are also available there.

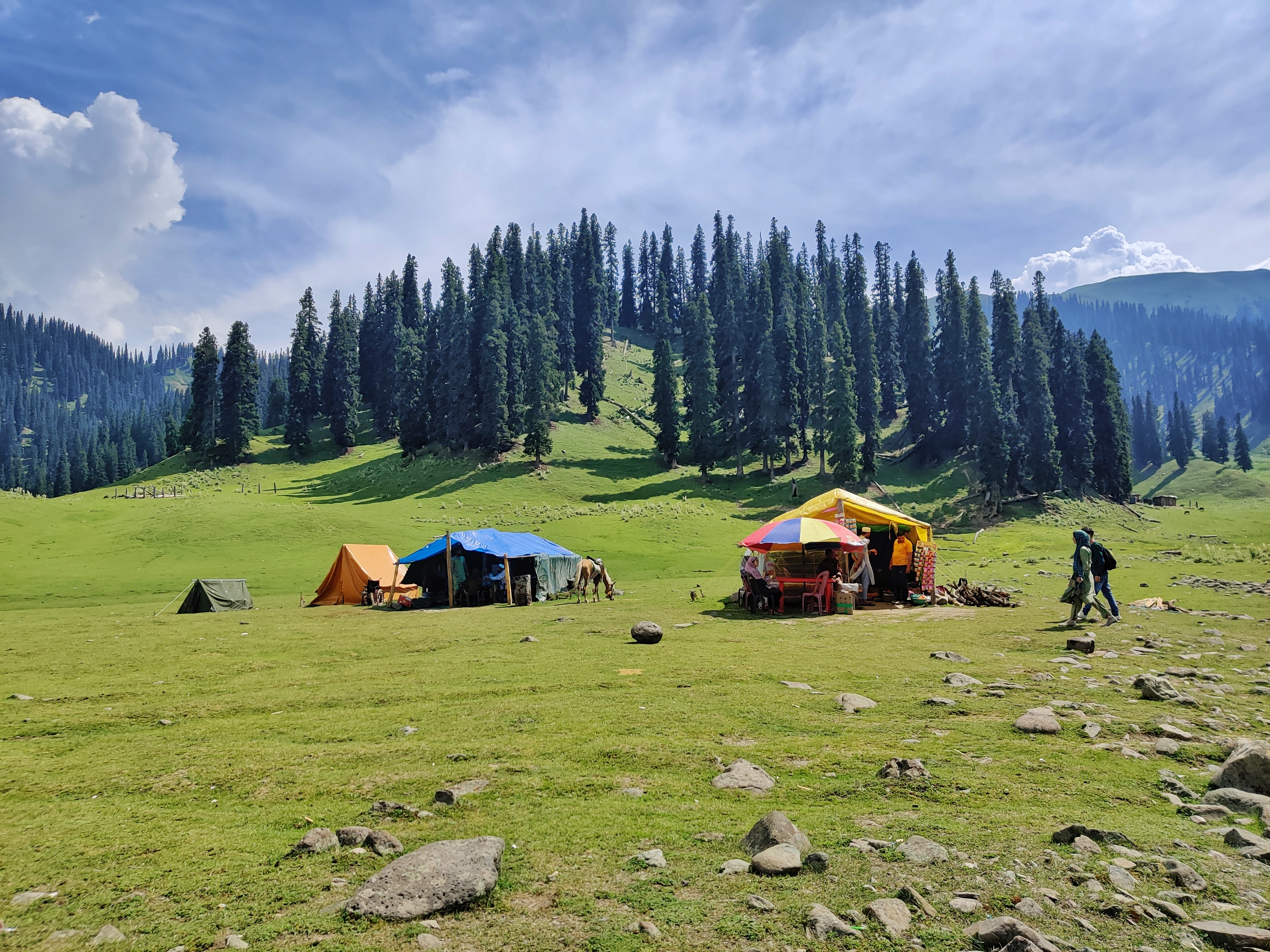
Tents Pitched In Bangus Valley Kashmir
