= Shah Faesal =

Indian civil servant, physician and former politician

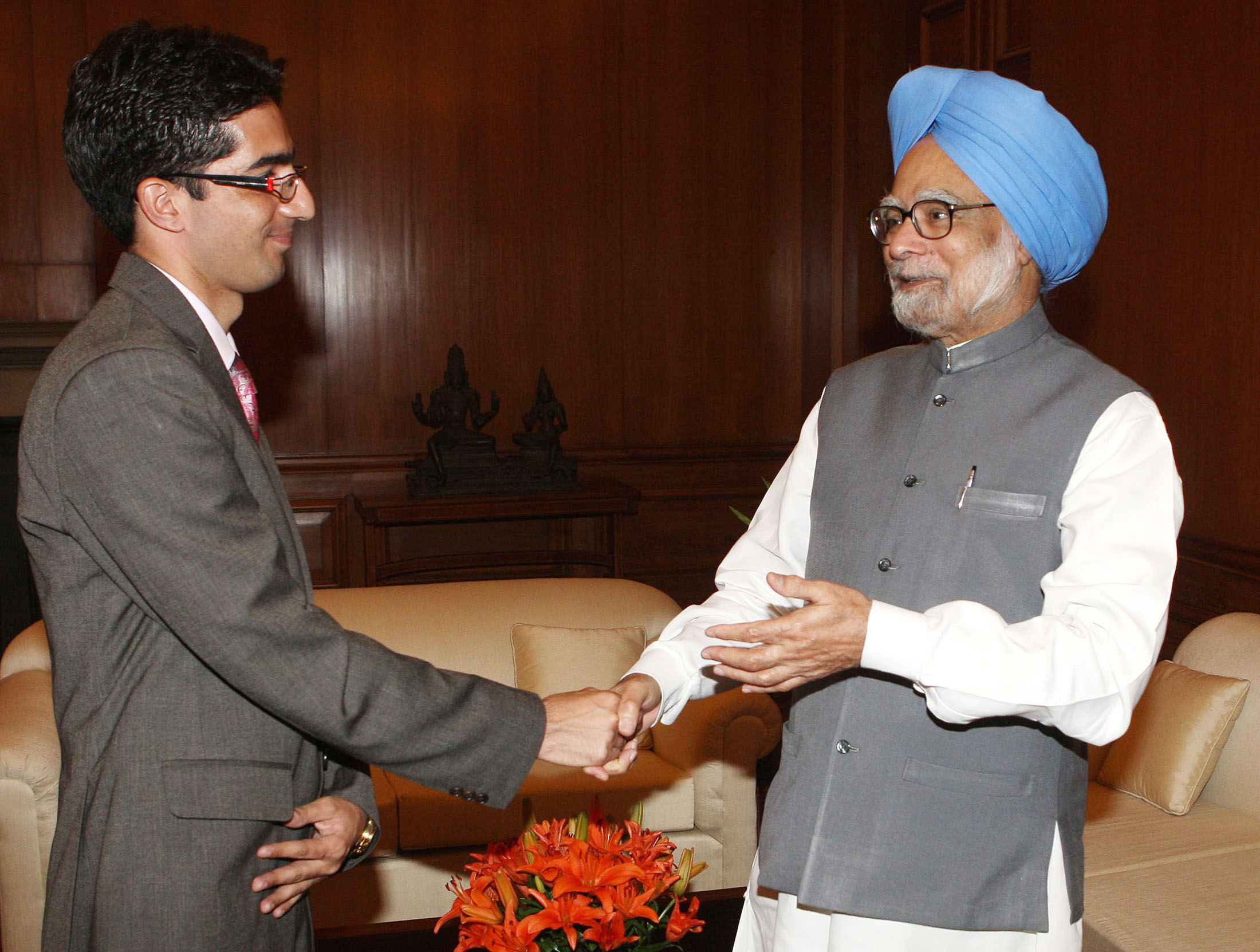
- Shah Faisal with Prime Minister Manmohan Singh

Deputy Secretary in Ministry of Culture (India)
- Incumbent
- Assumed office 11 August 2022

Chairman of Jammu & Kashmir People's Movement
- In office 21 March 2019 – 9 August 2020
- Preceded by: position established
- Succeeded by: Javaid Mustafa Mir

Managing Director (J&K State Power Development Corporation)
- In office 18 October 2016 – 9 January 2019
- Preceded by: Kifayat Rizvi
- Succeeded by: Hirdesh Kumar

Director School Education (Kashmir)
- In office 22 August 2015 – 18 October 2016
- Preceded by: Showkat Ahmad Beigh
- Succeeded by: Ajaz Ahmad Bhat

Deputy Commissioner (Bandipora)
- In office 8 February 2014 – 22 August 2015
- Preceded by: Mohammad Yousuf Zargar
- Succeeded by: Sajad Hussain Ganai

Assistant Commissioner, Revenue (Pulwama)
- In office 16 August 2012 – 8 February 2014
- Preceded by: Nasir Ahmad Lone
- Succeeded by: Syed Sajad Qadiri

Personal details
- Born: 17 May 1983 (age 43) Sogam Lolab, Kupwara, Jammu and Kashmir
- Spouse: Iram Rashid
- Children: 2
- Parent(s): Ghulam Rasool Shah; Mubeena Shah
- Education: Sher-i-Kashmir Institute of Medical Sciences, Srinagar, Jammu and Kashmir; Fulbright fellow at Harvard Kennedy School
- Profession: Bureaucrat, Doctor,

Shah Faesal (born 17 May 1983) is an Indian bureaucrat currently posted as Deputy Secretary in the Ministry of Culture (India) In 2010, Faesal secured Rank 1 and became the first Kashmiri to top the Indian Civil Services Examination. He tendered his resignation from the Indian bureaucracy in protest on 9 January 2019, citing "unabated killings" in Kashmir among other things, which, reportedly, was "never accepted" by the central government and he even withdrew the same later.

On 4 February 2019, Shah Faesal began his momentary political life by giving a public speech in his hometown of Kupwara. Shortly after, on 16 March 2019, he announced his own political party, the Jammu and Kashmir People's Movement (JKPM). He left politics on 10 August 2020 and quit the JKPM.

He was reinstated in the Indian Administrative Service in April 2022 by the Modi government. In August 2022, he was posted as Deputy Secretary in Union Ministry for Tourism.

== Early life and education ==
Faesal Shah was born in the Sogam area of Lolab Valley, located in Kupwara district of Jammu and Kashmir. His father, Ghulam Rasool Shah, was a teacher who was killed by militants in 2002. Shah Faesal was 19 at the time. His mother, Mubeena Shah, as well as grandfather were teachers.

He is a 2008 batch graduate of the Jhelum Valley Medical College. He holds an MBBS degree from Sher-i-Kashmir Institute of Medical Sciences (SKIMS), Srinagar as well as has a master's degree in Urdu. He finished MBBS at 26 and left IAS at 35. In 2018, he was a recipient of the Fulbright-Fellowship at Harvard Kennedy School.

== Bureaucrat career ==
Before cracking Civil Service exam, Faesal was the gold medalist at Sher-i-Kashmir Institute of Medical Sciences (SKIMS), Srinagar, where he studied medicine. In 2009, he became the first Kashmiri to get first place in the UPSC civil services exam, which he also cleared on his first attempt. He was also the first candidate from Kashmir in several years to be selected to the Indian Administrative Service (IAS) through open merit. He was the fourth Muslim (after Independence) to top the civil service exam.

On 16 August 2012, Faisal was appointed as the assistant commissioner, revenue, of Pulwama district. He was transferred to the deputy commissioner of Bandipora district on 8 February 2014. He was transferred to the position of Director School Education, Kashmir, on 22 August 2015, replacing Showkat Ahmad Beigh. Sajad Hussain Ganai replaced him as deputy commissioner of Bandipora. Faesal on 26 March 2016 was temporarily given the additional charge of the vice-chairman of J&K Lakes and Waterways Development Authority while Sarmad Hafeez had been sent to Hyderabad for the IAS Induction Training Programme.

During his stint as director of school education, he faced a months-long shutdown of schools during the 2016 Kashmir unrest, causing him to sarcastically post on Facebook that he needed a job, which invited varied comments. Ajaz Ahmad Bhat took over the charge from him on 18 October 2016, after he had been transferred to J&K State Power Development Corporation and made its managing director. He was transferred from his post to that of an administrative secretary to the state tourism department in May 2018, however, was later asked to remain on his current post.

Faesal also received the Fulbright-Nehru Masters's Fellowship in May 2018 to study at the Harvard Kennedy School. He tendered his resignation from the IAS on 9 January 2019 citing "unabated killings" in Kashmir among other things, through a Facebook post. He was also generally disillusioned with his role as a bureaucrat, which included jailing people and imposing curfews.

In April 2022, he presented an application for withdrawing his resignation & was reinstated in the service, and in August 2022, he was posted as Deputy Secretary in Union Ministry for Tourism.

== Political career ==
On 4 February 2019, Faesal Shah began his political life by giving a public speech in his hometown of Kupwara. During this speech he compared his experience in the IAS with feeling like having "spent the last 10 years in a jail." On 25 February 2019, he announced during a live debate on NDTV that he is launching his own political party and has already applied to the Election Commission regarding this. On 16 March 2019, he announced through Facebook that he would be launching his own political party on 17 March, the Jammu & Kashmir Peoples' Movement (JKPM), at a football ground in Rajbagh area, Srinagar.

Faesal formed the JKPM on 21 March and stated it would provide a political platform to the youth as well as veteran politicians with a clean image. He later announced that it will not contest the 2019 Indian general election to focus more on outreach, and encouraged people to vote for the right politicians. He also said the party would focus on safeguarding Article 370 and Article 35A of the Constitution of India. On 18 June, he and Engineer Rashid announced that their parties, JKPM and Awami Ittehad Party, would be entering into a political alliance called Peoples United Front. The main points of its agenda were the resolution of the Kashmir dispute based on the wishes of Kashmiris, peaceful relations between India and Pakistan, protecting the state's special status, return of Kashmiri Pandits and release of all politicians from detention.

Faesal was one of the political leaders detained after the revocation of the special status of Jammu and Kashmir. As he tried to take a flight to Turkey on 14 August 2019, he was stopped and later taken into preventive detention. He was first kept at the Centaur Hotel in Srinagar and then shifted to the MLA hostel where he spent the next six months.

Faesal later in August filed a habeas corpus plea before the Delhi High Court, stating that he was going to the United States to complete his studies, but had been illegally detailed. The government of the union territory stated that he had no student visa, and upon being brought to Srinagar Airport, provoked the people to protest against India. It additionally claimed that he had refused to guarantee that he won't create any such situation again if released. The plea was withdrawn by his wife after she met him in September 2019.

He was booked under the Public Safety Act in February 2020, being accused of subtly advocating separatism. The detention under PSA was extended by three months on 13 May. On 3 June, PSA against Faesal was revoked and he was released after a detention of 10 months. He was, however, put under house arrest on the very next day.

Faesal has also written for the Greater Kashmir newspaper and was a part of Jammu & Kashmir's Right to Information movement along with Dr. Raja Muzaffar Bhat.

JKPM announced on 10 August 2020 that Faisal had told them he couldn't remain in politics any longer and asked to be relieved from being a member of the party, which they acceded to. Chairman Javaid Mustafa Mir was chosen as his replacement.

== Controversies ==
Shah Faesal wrote many bold social media posts as a bureaucrat. In July 2018, when he was a civil servant, he had posted a tweet, writing:

"Population +patriarchy +illiteracy +alcohol +porn +technology +anarchy = rapistan".

People had said his tweet was in relation to India, but he had later clarified it was not. However disciplinary action was taken by the Jammu and Kashmir government as well as the central government's Ministry of Personnel, Public Grievances and Pensions and the inquiry was still going on before his resignation.

During the 2016 Kashmir unrest, Faesal had urged the national media not to use his pictures for drawing a comparison with Burhan Wani, a Kashmiri militant and commander of Hizbul Mujahideen. During this episode he had threatened to resign through a Facebook post if such primetime propaganda did not stop. In 2019, Hizbul Mujahideen circulated a poster warning people about Shah Faesal.

In February 2019, the Ministry of Home Affairs withdrew the security cover of 155 people in Jammu and Kashmir, and this included Shah Faesal, who had until then had been provided security as a bureaucrat.

On 14 August 2019 he was detained while flying out of IGI Airport to Turkey and sent back to Kashmir.

== Views ==
Apart from the Prime Minister of Pakistan Imran Khan, Shah Faesal has also named Delhi Chief Minister Arvind Kejriwal as a role model. Mani Shankar Aiyar, another Indian bureaucrat turned politician who went on to become a Union Minister, wrote an article on Shah Faesal called "Kashmir's Arvind Kejriwal".

On 3 March 2019, Shah Faesal recommended the Nobel Peace Prize for Imran Khan for "saving South Asia from a nuclear catastrophe."

Faesal, during a talk in New Delhi in February 2019 at the India International Center, said that Kashmir is like a "High Altitude Graveyard". He has suggested ways forward including "humanising the discourse" and advising people not to see the Kashmir issue as a mere "law and order problem".

On 5 March 2021, taking to Twitter, Faesal wrote, "Friends let’s sort it out for once. I have always been pro-India. But now I am single-mindedly, shamelessly, helplessly and unapologetically pro-India. I stick to my side. It is a long story and I have to tell this story one day. But this is how it is going to be. Peace."

== Personal life ==
Shah Faesal is married to Iram Rashid, an officer of KAS, and has a son named Jami Faesal.

== Bibliography ==
- Khalid Shah (2019). Shah Faesal and the paradox of Kashmir. Observer Research Foundation
- Murtaza Shibli (2019). Shah Faesal: A Forged Journey. Countercurrents.org
