= Wavoora =

- Village
- Location in Jammu and Kashmir, India Wavoora (India)
- Coordinates: 34.53°N 74.37°E
- Country: India
- Union Territory: Jammu and Kashmir
- District: Kupwara

Population (2011)
  - Total: 3,129

Languages
  - Official: Kashmiri, Urdu, Hindi, Dogri, English
- Time zone: UTC+5:30 (IST)
- PIN: 193223

Wavoora or Wavoor is a village in the Lolab Valley in the Kupwara district of the Indian state of Jammu and Kashmir, 13 kilometres (8.1 mi) from the district headquarters Kupwara.

== Demographics ==
According to the 2011 census of India, Wavoora has 401 households. The literacy rate of Wavoora village was 68.15% compared to 67.16% of Jammu and Kashmir. In Wavoora, Male literacy stands at 77.13% while the female literacy rate was 59.03%.

Demographics (2011 Census)
	Total	Male	Female
Population	3129	1582	1547
Children aged below 6 years	708	362	346
Scheduled caste	0	0	0
Scheduled tribe	27	10	17
Literacy	68.15%	77.13%	59.03%
Workers (all)	820	565	255
Main workers (total)	285	–	–
Marginal workers (total)	535	330	205

== See also ==
- Jammu and Kashmir
- Lolab Valley
- Kupwara
