= 51 Medium Regiment (India) =

- Active: 1961 – present
- Country: India
- Allegiance: India
- Branch: Indian Army
- Type: Artillery
- Size: Regiment
- Mottos: Sarvatra, Izzat-O-Iqbal (Everywhere with Honour and Glory); Farz-o-dileri
- Colors: Red & Navy Blue
- Anniversaries: 1 March – Raising Day

Insignia
- Abbreviation: 51 Med Regt

51 Medium Regiment is part of the Regiment of Artillery of the Indian Army.

== Formation ==
The regiment was raised on 1 March 1961 in a field area at Harchura in Assam as 51 Mountain Composite Regiment (Pack). It was one of the few animal pack artillery units raised prior to the 1962 war, when the gravity of the threat posed by the Chinese started emerging. The first commanding officer was Lieutenant Colonel (later Brigadier) Anyattuparmbil John Itty Cheria. The regiment had a headquarters battery, three mountain (pack) batteries with 3.7 inch mountain howitzers and a mortar battery equipped with 120 mm mortars. Three batteries were of Dogra troops and one of Sikhs. The regiment shed its pack animals in 1966. After 25 years as a mountain regiment, the unit was converted to a field regiment and is currently a medium regiment. The regiment presently consists of 139, 140 and 141 medium batteries. Of the initial four batteries, 142 Mountain Battery was hived off and formed the nucleus of 182 Light Regiment (Pack) in September 1965 (presently 1821 Light Regiment).

== Operations ==
The regiment has taken part in the following operations –

- Sino-Indian War – Soon after its formation, the regiment saw action in the Tawang Sector. Thought then still without its guns, it was deployed in an infantry role, used as reconnaissance and observation detachments and as forward observers during the war. Lieutenant A S Balasubramanian and four other ranks lost their lives during the war (when serving with 22 Mountain Regiment).
- During the Indo-Pakistani war of 1965, the unit was in the eastern sector and did not see action.
- Indo-Pakistani war of 1971 – The regiment was equipped with 75/24 mountain guns and was part of 19 Artillery Brigade under 19 Infantry Division. It was deployed along the Uri-Tangdhar axis in Jammu and Kashmir and saw intense action. 141 Mountain Battery was part of the artillery support for the 104 Infantry Brigade offensive in Tithwal sub-sector to capture many strategic posts.
- Operation Trident
- Operation Falcon
- Operation Rhino – counter terrorist operations in Assam
- Operation Rakshak – counter terrorist operations in Jammu and Kashmir.
- Operation Vijay

== Gallantry awards ==
The regiment has won the following gallantry awards -

- Shaurya Chakra – 1 (Major Gurmukh Singh Dhillon)
- Sena Medal – 4 (Major Jagtar Singh Virk)
- Vishisht Seva Medal – 1 (Colonel Rajesh Kumar)
- Chief of Army Staff Commendation cards – 16
- Vice Chief of Army Staff Commendation cards – 1
- General Officer Commanding in Chief Commendation cards – 16

== Motto ==
The motto of the regiment Farz-o-dileri was coined by the third commanding officer - Lieutenant Colonel AS Cheema.

== Notable Officers ==
- Major General Kuldip Singh Bajwa

== See also ==
- List of artillery regiments of Indian Army
