= 1821 Light Regiment (India) =

Indian Army artillery unit

- Active: 1965 – present
- Country: India
- Allegiance: India
- Branch: Indian Army
- Type: Artillery
- Size: Regiment
- Motto(s): SARVATRA, IZZAT-O-IQBAL “Everywhere With Honour and Glory”.
- Colors: "Red & Navy Blue"

Insignia
- Abbreviation: 1821 Lt Regt

1821 Light Regiment is part of the Regiment of Artillery of the Indian Army.

== Formation ==
1821 Light Regiment was raised at Siliguri on 15 September 1965 as 182 Light Regiment (Pack). The first Commanding Officer was Lieutenant Colonel E D Alexander. The nucleus of the regiment was the 142 Mountain Battery – which itself was raised on 1 March 1961 as part of 51 Mountain Regiment (Pack) at Harchura (Rangapara North), Assam.

In 1973, 182 Light Regiment (Pack), was split into 1821 (Independent) Light Battery and 1822 (Independent) Light Battery. The class composition was changed from a single class (Sikhs) to ‘All India, All Classes’. On 4 August 1984, the 1821 (Independent) Light Battery was redesignated as 1821 Light Regiment.

== History ==
Sino-Indian War

142 Mountain Battery took part in the operations in NEFA in 1962.

Nathu La clashes

During the Nathu La operation in 1967, 182 Light Regiment provided timely and effective fire support. Captain NS Burns was awarded the Sena Medal for his courageous action. It lost Gunner Sukhdev Singh.

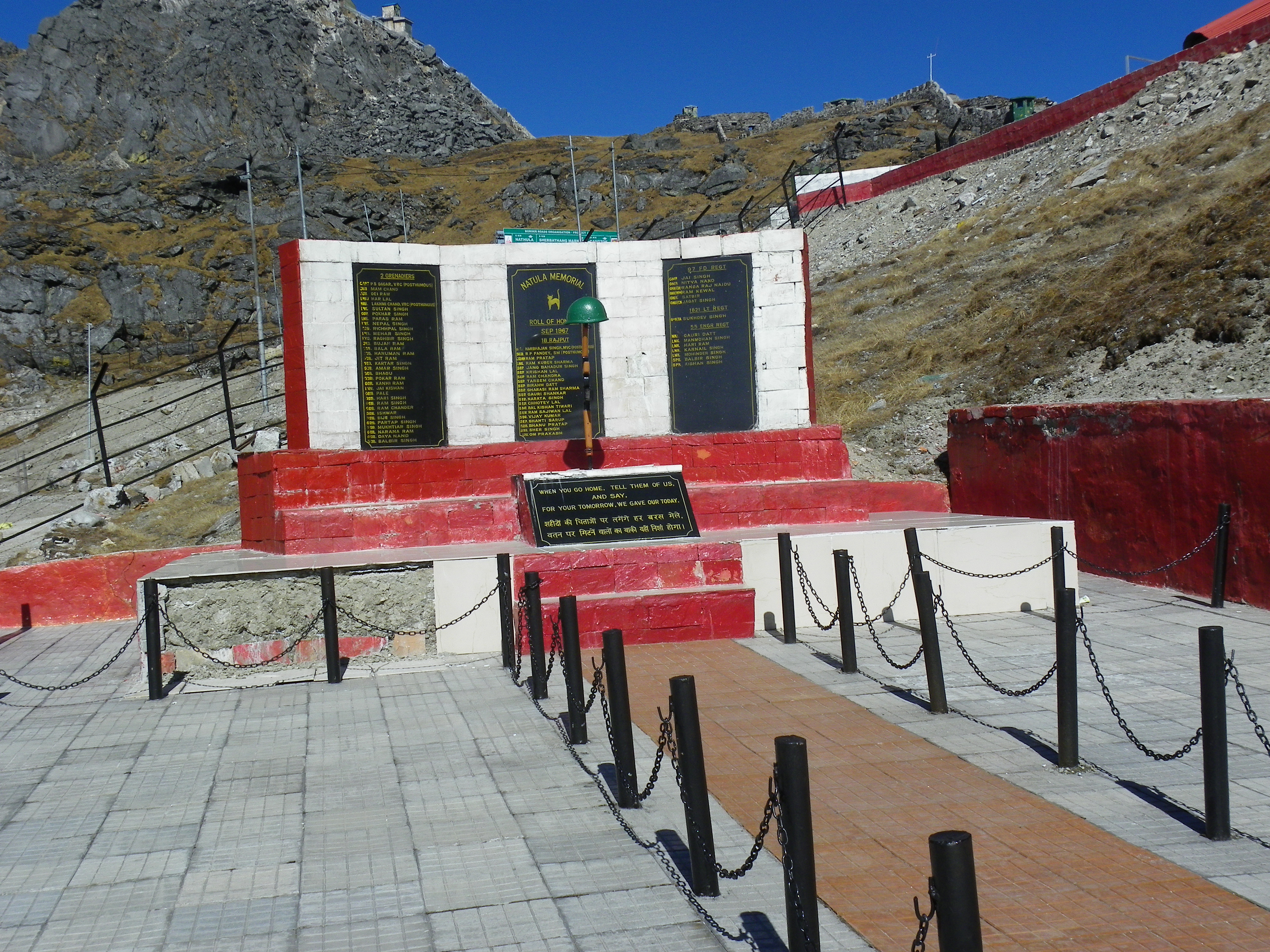
Memorial at Nathu La with the names of those martyred in the 1967 clashes

Indo-Pakistani War of 1971

The unit was part of the 104 Infantry Brigade under 19 Infantry Division in Tithwal Sub-sector. It proved its mettle in Lipa Valley at Tangdhar. It played a stellar role in providing fire support for the capture of Wanjal, when field and medium guns were crested.

Other operations

The regiment has also participated in Operation Rakshak between 1993 and 1996 at Gund, during Operation Vijay in 1999 at RS Pura and in Operation Parakram.

== Honours and awards ==
The regiment has won one Sena Medal, one Mentioned in dispatches, four COAS Commendation Cards and six Army Commander Commendation Cards.

== See also ==
- List of artillery regiments of Indian Army
