= National Highway 701A (India) =

National Highway in India

National Highway 701A
- Map of National Highway 701A in red
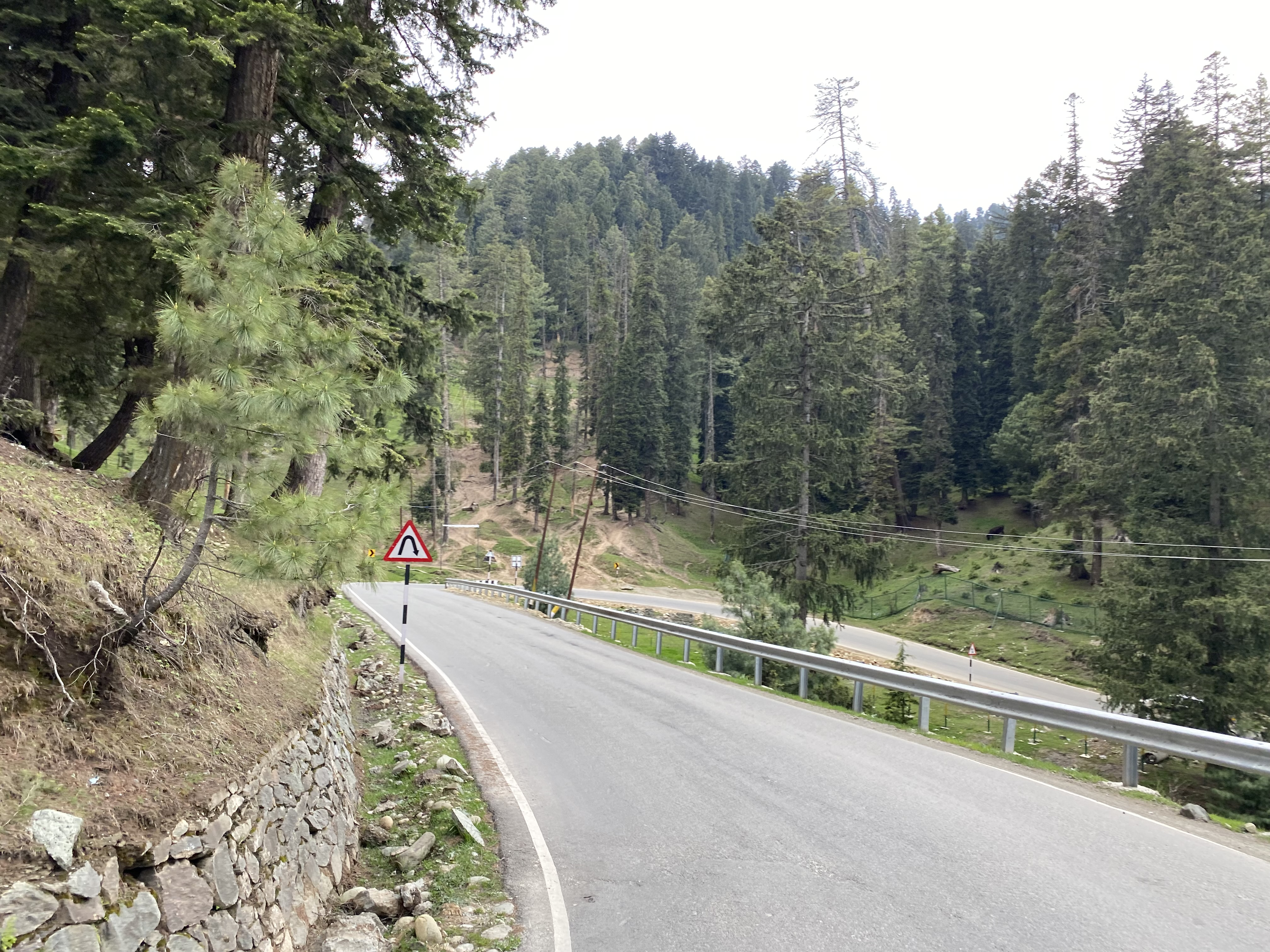
- NH 701A near Gulmarg in 2023

Route information
- Auxiliary route of NH 1
- Maintained by NHAI
- Length: 39 km (24 mi)

Major junctions
- North end: NH 1 in Baramulla
- South end: Gulmarg

Location
- Country: India
- States: Jammu and Kashmir

Highway system
- Roads in India; Expressways; National; State; Asian
← NH 701	→ NH 2

National Highway 701A, commonly referred to as NH 701A, is a national highway in India. It is a secondary route of National Highway 1. NH-701A runs in the state of Jammu and Kashmir in India.

== Route description ==
NH701A connects Baramulla and Gulmarg, in Baramulla district in the state of Jammu and Kashmir.

== Major intersections ==
NH 1 Terminal near Baramulla.

== See also ==
- List of national highways in India
- List of national highways in India by state
