= Sogam Lolab =

Town in Indian-administered Jammu and Kashmir

- Sogam
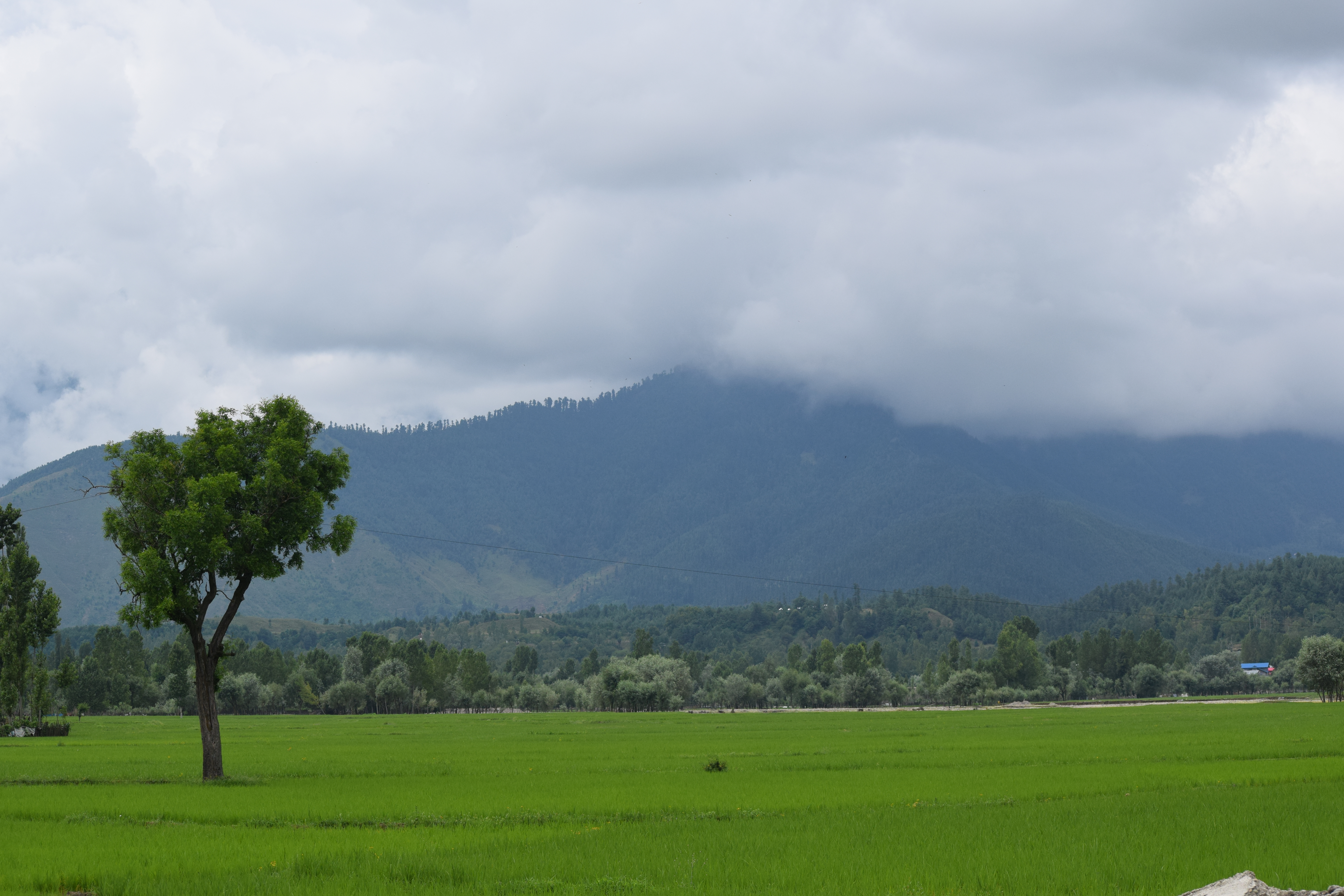

- Location in Jammu and Kashmir, India Sogam Lolab (India)
- Coordinates: 34°29′50.8″N 74°22′51.8″E
- Country: Administered by India
- Union Territory: Jammu and Kashmir
- District: Kupwara
- Elevation: 1,696 m (5,564 ft)

Population
  - Total: 16,166

Languages
  - Official: Kashmiri, Urdu, Hindi, Dogri, English
- Time zone: UTC+5:30 (IST)
- PIN: 193223
- Telephone code: 0195
- Vehicle registration: JK 09
- Sex ratio: 898 ♀/ 1000 ♂
- Literacy: 79.61%
- Climate: Cfa
- Precipitation: 710 millimetres (28 in)
- Avg. summer temperature: 23.3 °C (73.9 °F)
- Avg. winter temperature: 3.2 °C (37.8 °F)
- Website: www.smcsite.org

Sogam Lolab is a municipality located in Kupwara district of the Kashmir Valley, in the Indian union territory of Jammu and Kashmir. Roughly 17 km from Kupwara city, Sogam Lolab is a prominent town situated in the heart of the scenic Lolab Valley and holds significant administrative importance in the region. Functioning as the sub-district headquarters, Sogam serves as the central hub for governance and public administration for the surrounding villages and settlements within the valley. The town is home to various key government offices, including those for revenue, health, education, and rural development departments.

It is separated from Bandipora district to the east by the Nagmarg Meadows. Sogam is situated at an altitude of 1,589 metres (5,213 ft) above sea level and has a population of approximately 16,166 with literacy rate of about 79.61%.

== Geography ==
The Lolab Valley falls within the jurisdiction of Sogam Lolab, a sub-division of Kupwara. It is bordered by the Kashmir Valley to the south and the Neelum Valley to the north and is separated Bandipora to the east by the Nagmarg Meadows. The valley is formed by the flow of the Lahwal River, which runs from east to west. The Lolab Valley is home to many ancient springs and is covered with dense forests of deodar, kair, budul, pine, and fir. Fruit trees such as apple, cherry, peach, apricot, and walnut are common in the valley, which is known as "the fruit bowl of Jammu and Kashmir". The valley contains several natural landmarks and tourist spots, including the caves of Kalaroos and Green Meadows. The main villages in the Lolab Valley include Saiwan, Surigam, Putushai, Khumriyal, Sogam, Lalpora, Darpora, Cherkoot, Kalaroos, Wavoora, Maidanpora, Shalgund, Khurhama, Warnow, Aafan, Takipora, Cheepora, Goose.

== Ecology ==
Like other valleys in the region, Sogam Lolab is home to many Himalayan wild animals, including the Himalayan black bear, Himalayan brown bear, snow leopard, ibex, markhor, the hangul, and the musk deer. The overall Lolab Valley, particularly Sogam Lolab, is adjacent to Kishenganga Valley, and separated by the Line of Control. The Valley has witnessed many armed conflicts, which have caused displacement of wild species and significant damage to the local environment and peopulation.

== Educational Institutes ==
- Govt Boys Higher Secondary School Sogam
- Govt Girls Higher Secondary School Sogam
- Govt Degree College Sogam

== Notable people ==
- Shah Faesal - the first IAS topper from Kashmir, and a bureaucrat
- Mushtaq Ahmad Lone, former Cabinet Minister, politician
- Qaysar Jamshaid Lone, politician, MLA Lolab
- Ghulam Nabi Wani - former politician
