= Ghulam Nabi Wani =

Indian politician

Ghulam Nabi Wani Sogami

Member of J&K Legislative Assembly

Personal details
- Born: Ghulam Nabi Wani Sogami; 2 January 1916; Sogam Lolab, Jammu & Kashmir, British India
- Died: 23 July 1981; Srinagar, Jammu & Kashmir, India
- Resting place: Sogam Lolab, Jammu & Kashmir, India
- Political party: Janata Party & INC
- Occupation: Indian Politician

Ghulam Nabi Wani Sogami (O2 January 1916 - 23 July 1981) was an Indian politician from the erstwhile state of Jammu and Kashmir. He was the grandfather of Nasir Aslam Wani. Born in Sogam Lolab, Wani represented the Lolab Valley constituency of Kupwara district, as an MLA from 1951 to 1977.

== Ministry ==
Sogami was a Minister in Bakshi Ghulam Mohammad's Cabinet. He was a Cabinet Minister for Forests, Industries & Commerce, and Rural Development.

Sogami died in the Rajbagh neighborhood of Srinagar, India on 23 July, 1981.
