= Diver Anderbugh =

Diver
- Village
- Diver Anderbugh
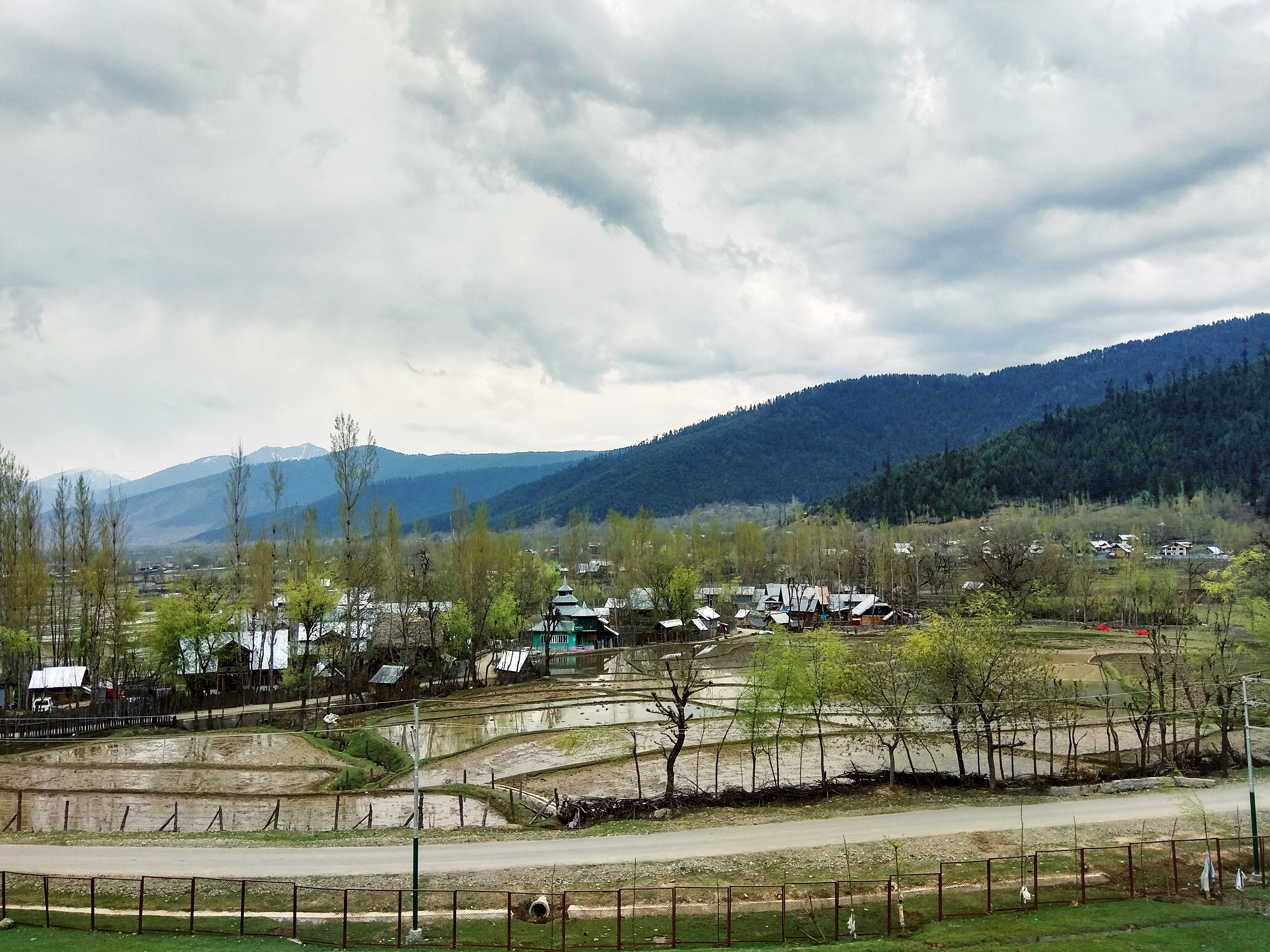
- Nickname: Diver
- Location in Jammu and Kashmir, India Diver (India)
- Coordinates: 34°27′22.3″N 74°27′02.2″E
- Country: India
- Union territory: Jammu and Kashmir
- District: Kupwara

Government
  - Type: Sarpanch
  - Body: Local Panchayat

Area Sub villages
  - Total: 6 km^{2} (2.3 sq mi)
  - Rank: 4

Population (2011)
  - Total: 13,075
  - Density: 2,200/km^{2} (5,600/sq mi)

Languages
  - Official: Kashmiri, Hindi, Urdu, Dogri, English
  - Spoken: Kashmiri, Pahari
- Time zone: UTC+5:30 (IST)
- PIN: 193223

Diver Anderbugh is a village situated in the Lolab Valley, Kupwara, Jammu and Kashmir, India. The village is combination of two places, Diver and Anderbugh. The site is connected to the village of Anderbugh. It is situated 25 kilometres (16 mi) away from district headquarter Kupwara.

== Demography ==
Diver Anderbugh has a total population of 10,863 of which 5,495 are males while 5,368 are females, the village with a total of 1,378 families residing as per Population Census 2011. The total geographical area of village is 456.5 hectares. Diver is at an altitude of 1,590 metres (5,215 ft) above the Sea level.

In Diver Anderbugh, the population of children with age 0-6 is 3,028 which makes up 27.87% of total population of the village. Average sex ratio of Diver Anderbugh is 977 which is higher than Jammu and Kashmir state average of 889. Child sex ratio for the Diver Anderbugh as per census is 960, higher than Jammu and Kashmir average of 862.

Diver Anderbugh has lower literacy rate compared to Jammu and Kashmir. In 2011, literacy rate of Diver Anderbugh was 65.87% compared to 67.16% of Jammu and Kashmir. In Diver Anderbugh, Male literacy stands at 77.70% while female literacy rate was 53.85% as per Census 2011.

== Administration ==
As per constitution of India and Panchyati Raj Act, Diver Anderbugh is administrated by Sarpanch (Head of Village) who is elected representative of village.

New Tourist Site (Kairwan) is under Construction at Anderbugh.
