= Nasir Aslam Wani =

Indian politician

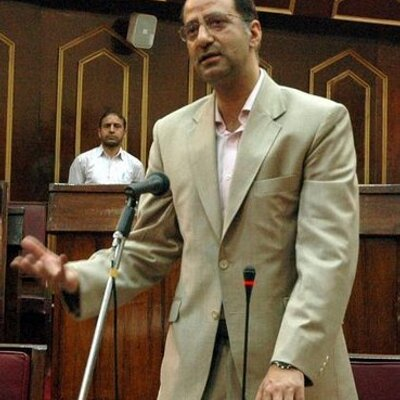
- Wani at Jammu and Kashmir Legislative Assembly, Srinagar in 2013

Advisor to Chief Minister of J&K
- In office 16th October 2024 – Incumbent

Member of Legislative Assembly
- In office 2008–2014
- Preceded by: Muhammed Shafi Bhat
- Succeeded by: Syed Mohammad Altaf Bukhari
- Constituency: Amira Kadal

Minister of State for Housing & Urban Development, PHE, Tourism, Revenue & Relief
- In office 2009–2014

Minister of State for Home
- In office 2011–2014

Personal details
- Born: 31 August 1964 (age 61) Srinagar
- Party: Jammu and Kashmir National Conference (since 1998)
- Spouse: Samia Nasir (m. 1990)
- Children: Saadat and Sarmad (sons)
- Occupation: Politician

Nasir Aslam Wani (born 31 August 1964) is an Indian politician from the union territory of Jammu and Kashmir and belongs to the National Conference party.

He has served the State as the Minister of State for Tourism & Culture, Housing & Urban Development, PHE, Revenue & Relief and later taking on responsibility for the Minister of State Home department as an additional portfolio.

He won the state assembly elections in 2008 from Amirakadal Constituency and served as a minister in the cabinet.

In the 2024 assembly elections Wani contested from Kupwara and lost to Fayaz Mir of PDP, Wani was then nominated as the Advisor to the Chief Minister Omar Abdullah. He is the grandson of politician, late Ghulam Nabi Wani Sogami.

== Political career ==
Nasir Aslam Wani was involved with various NGOs for social work. He joined the Youth National Conference in 1998 and was nominated as Central Secretary. He worked as the Provincial Secretary of Kashmir Province and was also a member of the Central Working Committee of the Jammu and Kashmir National Conference.

=== Amirakadal Constituency ===
At Amirakadal, Nasir got 3922 votes against 3103 of his rival Parvez Ahmad of PDP.

== Ministry ==
Wani was elected as a member of J&K Legislative Assembly in 2008 General Elections from Amirakadal Constituency; inducted in the Council of Ministers headed by Mr. Omar Abdullah as Minister of State for Housing & Urban Development, PHE, Tourism and Revenue & Relief on 11 July 2009.

=== Home Ministry ===
In 2011, Wani was given an additional charge of the Home Department.
