= Lolab Valley =

Valley in Kupwara, Jammu and Kashmir, India

- Lolo
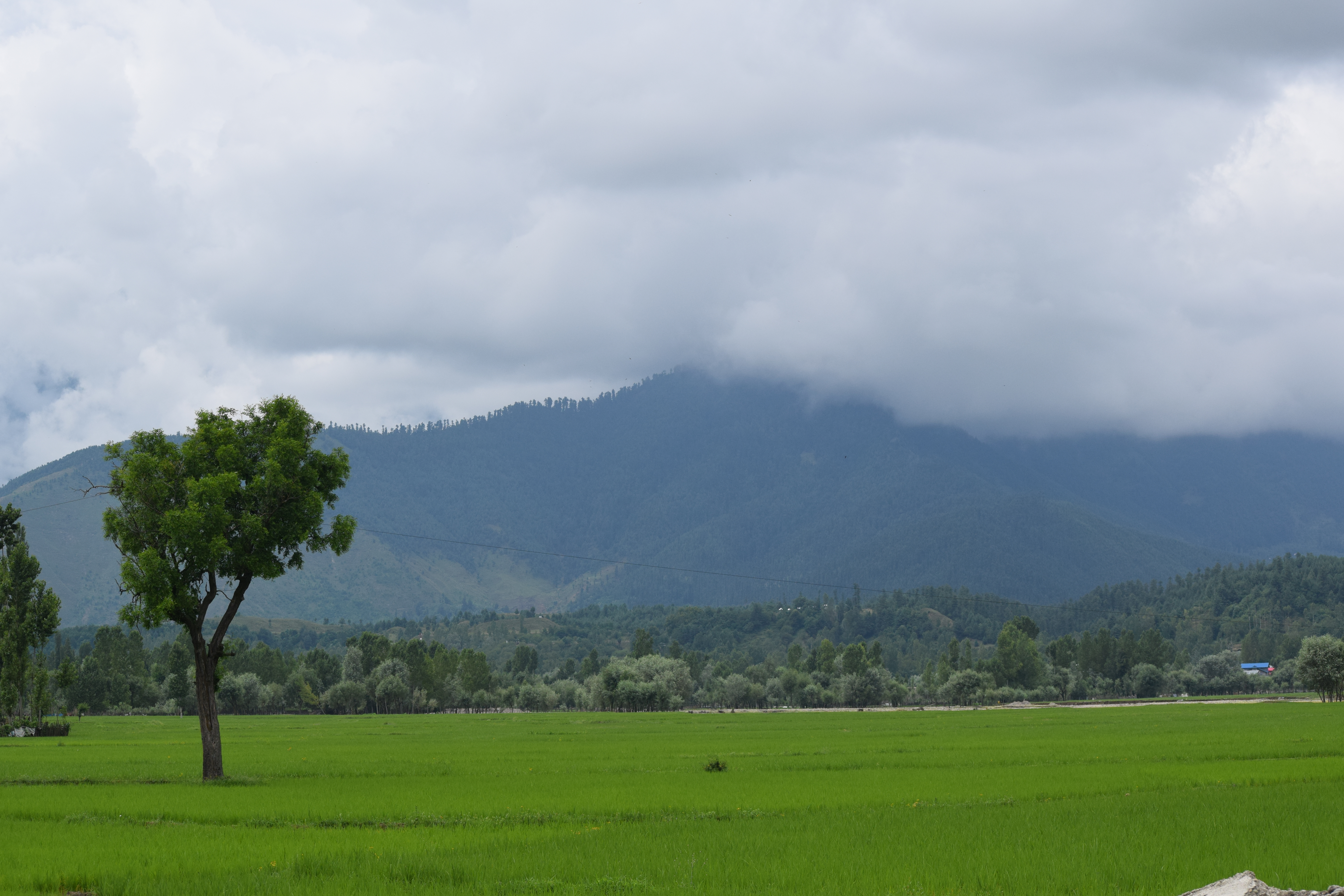
- Lolab Valley

- Location within Jammu and Kashmir Location within India
- Floor elevation: 5,464 ft (1,665 m)
- Length: 16 mi (26 km)
- Width: 3.10 mi (4.99 km)

Geography
- Country: India
- State: Jammu and Kashmir
- District: Kupwara
- Borders on: Kishanganga River (North); Kashmir Valley (South)
- Coordinates: 34°29′50″N 74°24′45″E
- River: Lahwal River
- Interactive map of Lolab Valley

The Lolab Valley, earlier known as Lolo, is a Himalayan sub-valley of the larger Kashmir Valley located in the northern Kupwara district of the Indian union territory of Jammu and Kashmir in the disputed Kashmir region. It is named after its founder, Maharaja Lolo. Lolab Valley extends from its entrance at Goose Village, 1 km (0.62 mi) east of Kupwara, to Diver. The valley is oval-shaped, 15 miles (26 km) long with an average width of 3.10 miles (5 km) that includes three sub-valleys: Kalaroos, Potnai, and Brunai. The valley is at an altitude of 1,590 metres (5,215 ft) above sea level. Lolab Valley is characterised by lush green fields, dense forests, and scenic views, making it a popular destination for nature enthusiasts and tourists seeking tranquility.

== Geography ==
The Lolab Valley is situated within the jurisdiction of Sogam Lolab, a sub-division of Kupwara. Lolab is a sub-district of Kupwara. It is a sub-valley of the much larger Kashmir Valley and borders to the bulk of the main valley or Bandipore in south by the Nagmarg meadows. In the north it is bordered by the Neelum Valley. It is formed by the Lahwal River, which flows from east to west. The Lolab Valley is home to many ancient springs and is covered with dense forests of deodar, kair, budul, pine, and fir. Fruit trees such as apple, cherry, peach, apricot, and walnut are common in the valley, which is known as "the fruit bowl of Jammu and Kashmir". The valley has several natural landmarks and tourist spots, such as the caves of Kalaroos and Green Meadows. The main villages in the Lolab Valley are Saiwan, Surigam, Putushai, Khumriyal, Sogam, Lalpora, Darpora, Cherkoot, Kalaroos, Wavoora, Maidanpora, Khurhama, Warnow, Aafan, Tekipora, Cheepora, Goose, wani dorusa

== Ecology ==
Like other valleys in the region, Lolab Valley is also home to many Himalayan wild animals, which include the Himalayan black bear, Himalayan brown bear, snow leopard, ibex, markhor, hangul, and musk deer. Lolab Valley is adjacent to Kishenganga Valley, and separated by the Line of Control. The Valley has seen many armed combats, which have resulted in the displacement of many wild animals.

== Access ==
The Lolab Valley is well connected by road to Srinagar, the capital of Jammu and Kashmir, and Srinagar Airport. A bus takes 2 hours & 30 minutes to cover a distance of 114 km (71 mi) and leads through the towns of Sopore and Kupwara. An under-construction road from Bandipora to Lolab via Anderbugh, Nagmarg Meadows, will cut short the Srinagar-to-Lolab distance by 50 kilometres. In Lolab Valley, there are a few tourist huts and many camping sites. It has the potential to become one of the best tourist destinations in Kashmir.

== Tourism ==
Travelers visiting Lolab sometimes visit the resting place of the saint Kashyap Reshi, which is located at a distance of 1 km from the village of Lalpora. A spring called Lavnag can be found nearby. The spring is three feet deep and has crystal clear water. Gauri Spring is another major spring in the area. Due lack of intervention by the government, the place has a very poor flow of tourists, which keeps its tourism potential still unexplored. This place still manages to be one of the topmost camping sites in Kashmir.

Some tourist attractions in the valley include Nagmarg Camping Site, Kairwan, Satbaran Kalaroos, Kalaroos Caves, Chandigam, Warnow, Aafan, Machil, Kairwan Anderbugh, Gagal, Doorusa, and some upper forest places like Nagmarg, Trumukhann, Nachyan, Lashkoot, Ibje Pathar, and Kimsar.

== Poem ==
Lolab Valley was once visited by the Urdu poet Muhammad Iqbal, and he wrote a poem, O Valley of Lolab! in honour of Lolab's natural environment, which starts with:

پانی ترے چشموں کا تڑپتا ہوا سیماب

مرغانِ سحَرتیری فضاؤں میں ہیں بیتاب

اے وادیِ لولاب اے وادیِ لولاب

The waters of thy springs, like restless, shimmering quicksilver

the morning birds fluttering about the sky, agitated and in turmoil,

O Valley of Lolab! O Valley of Lolab!'

گر صاحبِ ہنگامہ نہ ہو منبر ومحراب

دیں بندہٌ مومن کے لیے موت ہے یا خواب

اے وادیِ لولاب اےوادیِ لولاب

When the pulpit and the niche cease to re‐create Resurrections,

faith then is dead or a mere dream, for thee, me, and all.

O Valley of Lolab! O Valley of Lolab!

== Notable people ==
- Shah Faesal, a bureaucrat and the first Kashmir Civil Services Examination topper.
- Anwar Shah Kashmiri, an Islamic scholar of hadith
- Mushtaq Ahmad Lone, Cabinet Minister, Politician
- Abdul Haq Khan, cabinet minister
- Qaysar Jamshaid Lone, Politician, MLA Lolab
- Ashraf Sehrai, politician, separatist, and former chairman and founding member of Tehreek-e-Hurriyat
- Ghulam Nabi Wani, politician

== See also ==
- Kupwara district
- Lolab Assembly constituency
- Sogam Lolab
