= Tangdhar, Jammu and Kashmir =

Tangdhar
- Village
- Location in Jammu and Kashmir, India Tangdhar (India)
- Coordinates: 34.39°N 73.86°E
- Country: India
- Union territory: Jammu and Kashmir
- District: Kupwara

Languages
  - Official: Kashmiri, Hindi, Urdu, Dogri, English
  - Spoken: Pahari, Kashmiri, Gojri
- Time zone: UTC+5:30 (IST)
- PIN: 193225
- Vehicle registration: JK

Tangdhar is a village located in Kupwara district of the Indian administered union territory of Jammu and Kashmir. The village is located at a distance of 67 kilometres (42 mi) from the district headquarters Kupwara. It is a forward village along the Line of Control (LoC). With Neelum District to its north and Leepa to the south, Tangdhar is surrounded by Pakistan administered Kashmir from three sides. Tangdhar sector is popular for infiltrations by militants from Islamist militant and terrorist organisations based in Pakistan-administered Kashmir and for cross-border shelling along the line of control.

== Climate ==
Climate data for Tangdhar (1981–2023 via satellite observations )
Month	Jan	Feb	Mar	Apr	May	Jun	Jul	Aug	Sep	Oct	Nov	Dec	Year
Record high °C (°F)	19.5 (67.1)	20.7 (69.3)	25.2 (77.4)	28.5 (83.3)	32.3 (90.1)	34.8 (94.6)	36.1 (97.0)	35.2 (95.4)	33.4 (92.1)	30.6 (87.1)	22.9 (73.2)	19.8 (67.6)	36.1 (97.0)
Mean daily maximum °C (°F)	3.1 (37.6)	6.9 (44.4)	10.1 (50.2)	18.5 (65.3)	21.3 (70.3)	25.2 (77.4)	26.4 (79.5)	26.1 (79.0)	24.8 (76.6)	19.5 (67.1)	10.4 (50.7)	5.1 (41.2)	16.5 (61.6)
Mean daily minimum °C (°F)	−7.1 (19.2)	−5.8 (21.6)	−2.4 (27.7)	1.5 (34.7)	7.2 (45.0)	10.9 (51.6)	13.5 (56.3)	13.3 (55.9)	10.1 (50.2)	0.8 (33.4)	−3.7 (25.3)	−6.2 (20.8)	2.7 (36.8)
Record low °C (°F)	−24.2 (−11.6)	−27.8 (−18.0)	−12.3 (9.9)	−5.1 (22.8)	−3.5 (25.7)	1.8 (35.2)	5.4 (41.7)	4.9 (40.8)	1.3 (34.3)	−6.4 (20.5)	−13.2 (8.2)	−23.1 (−9.6)	−27.8 (−18.0)
Average rainfall mm (inches)	140.2 (5.52)	144.6 (5.69)	304.7 (12.00)	240.1 (9.45)	184.9 (7.28)	82.4 (3.24)	134.2 (5.28)	131.8 (5.19)	43.4 (1.71)	42.1 (1.66)	31.0 (1.22)	128.3 (5.05)	1,607.7 (63.29)
Average rainy days	11.4	12.1	18.2	13.4	8.6	4.7	8.3	7.4	2.6	3.7	3.5	4.6	78.3
Source: India Meteorological Department

== See also ==
- Kupwara
- Lolab Valley
- Kupwara district
- Tulail Valley
- Teetwal
