= Tehreek-e-Hurriyat =

Political party in Jammu and Kashmir

Tehreek-e-Hurriyat (lit. 'Movement for Freedom') is a separatist political party in Jammu and Kashmir, India founded by Syed Ali Shah Geelani. It was founded on 7 August 2004 after Geelani quit his former party Jamaat-e-Islami Kashmir. The Indian government on 31 December 2023 declared the party an ‘Unlawful Association’ under the anti-terror law- the Unlawful Activities (Prevention) Act (UAPA) for a period of five years.

Geelani stated that, when he was released from prison, his former party Jamaat-e-Islami Kashmir "retired" him. He needed to form a party in order to be part of the All Parties Hurriyat Conference (APHC). He continued to serve as the Chairman of his faction of APHC, referred to as APHC (G).

On its first foundation day, 7 August 2004, more than 1 lakh people, according to most conservative estimates, gathered at Hyderpora, Srinagar; showing solidarity and commitment to its objectives and goals. In August 2006, instead of a public convention, Tehreek-e-Hurriyat's Central Council decided to organize a convention of members, candidates for membership and the basic members of the party. Need was felt to elaborate the basic goals and objectives of Tehreek-e-Hurriyat in this convention. The convention was scheduled for Sunday to make it easier for the majority of members to participate. The basic objective before the founders of Tehreek-e-Hurriyat is to earn Allah's pleasure through unambiguous service to the basic principles of Islam (Faith), Azadi (Freedom) and Itihad-e-Millat (Fraternity).

Ashraf Sehrai was elected as chairman of TeH in 2018 after Geelani stepped down from the post citing ill health and his house detention as reasons. Ameer Hamza Shah was elected as the chairman in February 2022 following Sehrai's death.

In December 2023, the Tehreek-e-Hurriyat was banned for five years by the union government of India under the Unlawful Activities (Prevention) Act (UAPA), stating that it wanted to separate Jammu and Kashmir from India, establish an Islamic state, spread anti-Indian propaganda and supported terrorism.
