= Qaysar Jamshaid Lone =

Indian politician

Member of Jammu and Kashmir Legislative Assembly
- Incumbent
- Assumed office 8 October 2024
- Preceded by: Abdul Haq Khan
- Constituency: Lolab

Personal details
- Political party: Jammu & Kashmir National Conference
- Profession: Politician

Qaysar Jamshaid Lone is an Indian politician from Jammu and Kashmir. He is a member of the Jammu and Kashmir Legislative Assembly from 2024, representing Lolab Assembly constituency as a member of the Jammu & Kashmir National Conference party.

== See also ==
- 2024 Jammu and Kashmir Legislative Assembly election
- Jammu and Kashmir Legislative Assembly
