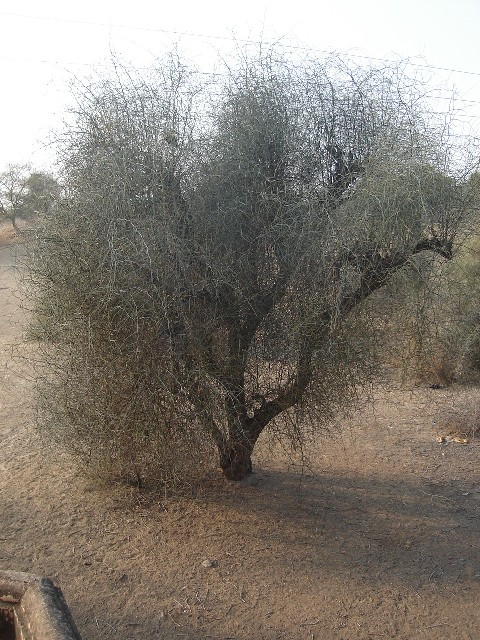

Conservation status
- Least Concern (IUCN 3.1)

Scientific classification
- Kingdom: Plantae
- Clade: Tracheophytes
- Clade: Angiosperms
- Clade: Eudicots
- Clade: Rosids
- Order: Brassicales
- Family: Capparaceae
- Genus: Capparis
- Species: C. decidua

Binomial name
- Capparis decidua (Forssk.) Edgew.

Synonyms
- Capparis aphylla Roth; Capparis decidua Pax; Capparis sodada R.Br. nom. illeg.; Sodada decidua Forssk.

= Capparis decidua =

Species of tree

Capparis decidua, commonly known as karira/kair (Rajasthani: कैर), karīr (Punjabi: ਕਰੀਰ / کریر) or karil (Braj Bhasha: करील) is a useful plant in its marginal habitat.

== Description ==
It is a small much-branched tree or shrub. It bears a mass of slender, gray-green leafless branches, the small caducous leaves being found only on young shoots. It rarely exceeds a height of 5 metres (16 feet).

The new flush of leaves appears in November–January. Red conspicuous flowers appear in March to April and August–September and ripe by May and October. The pink fleshy berries are readily eaten by birds. It coppices well and produces root suckers freely. It is extremely drought-resistant and tolerates some frost.

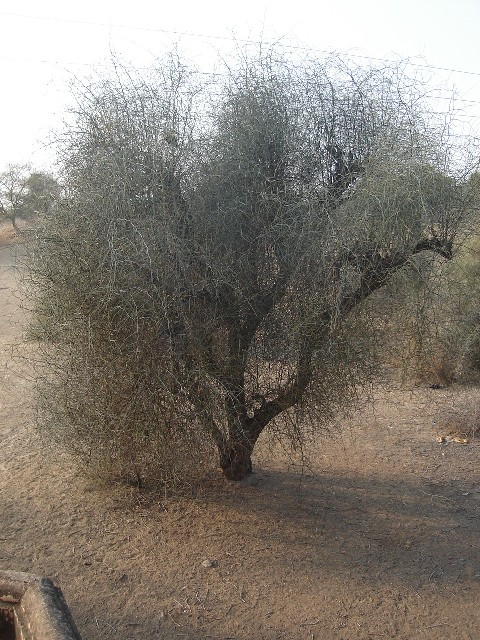
Tree without fruits

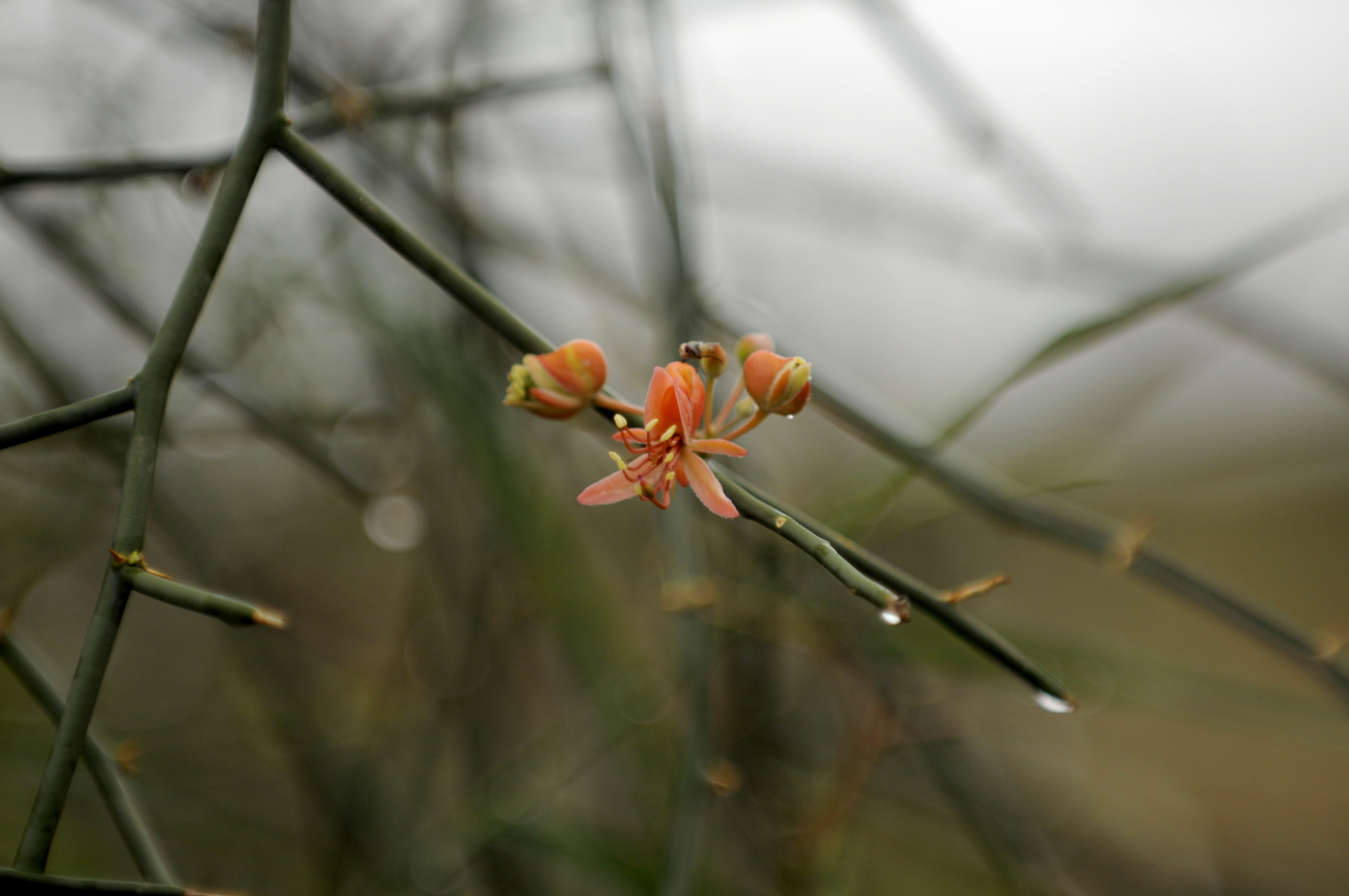
Flower on branch

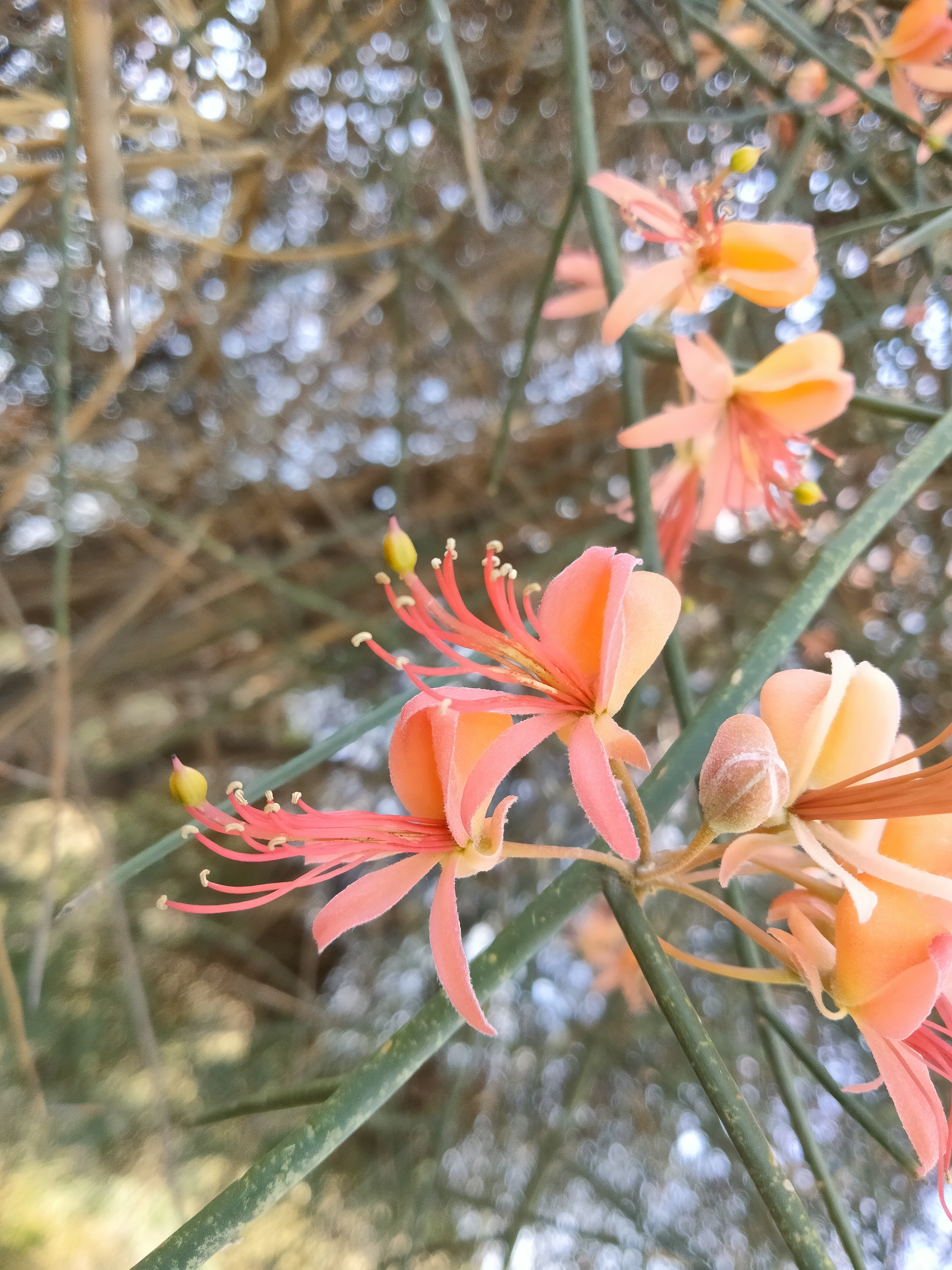
Flowers

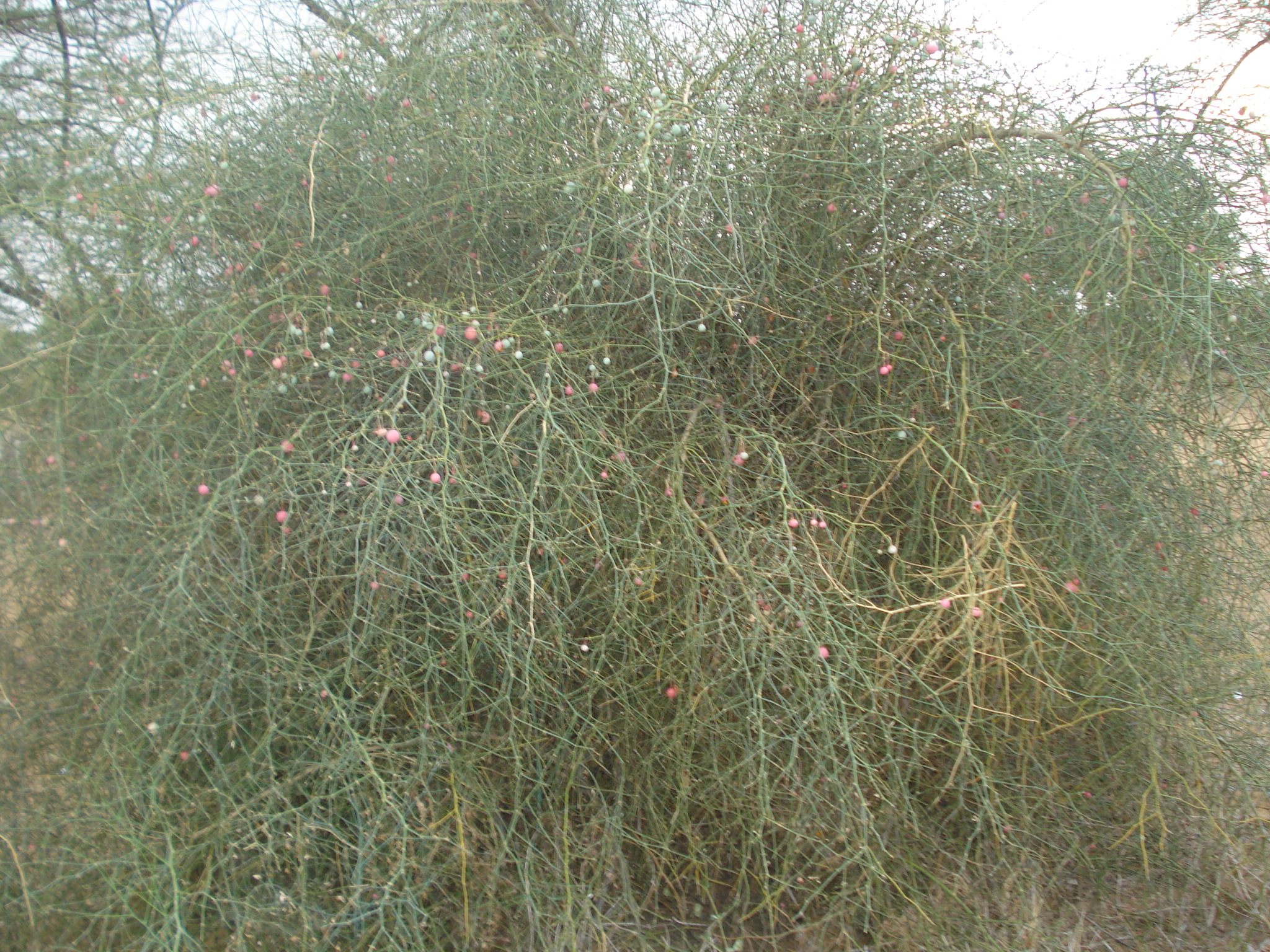
Tree with fruits

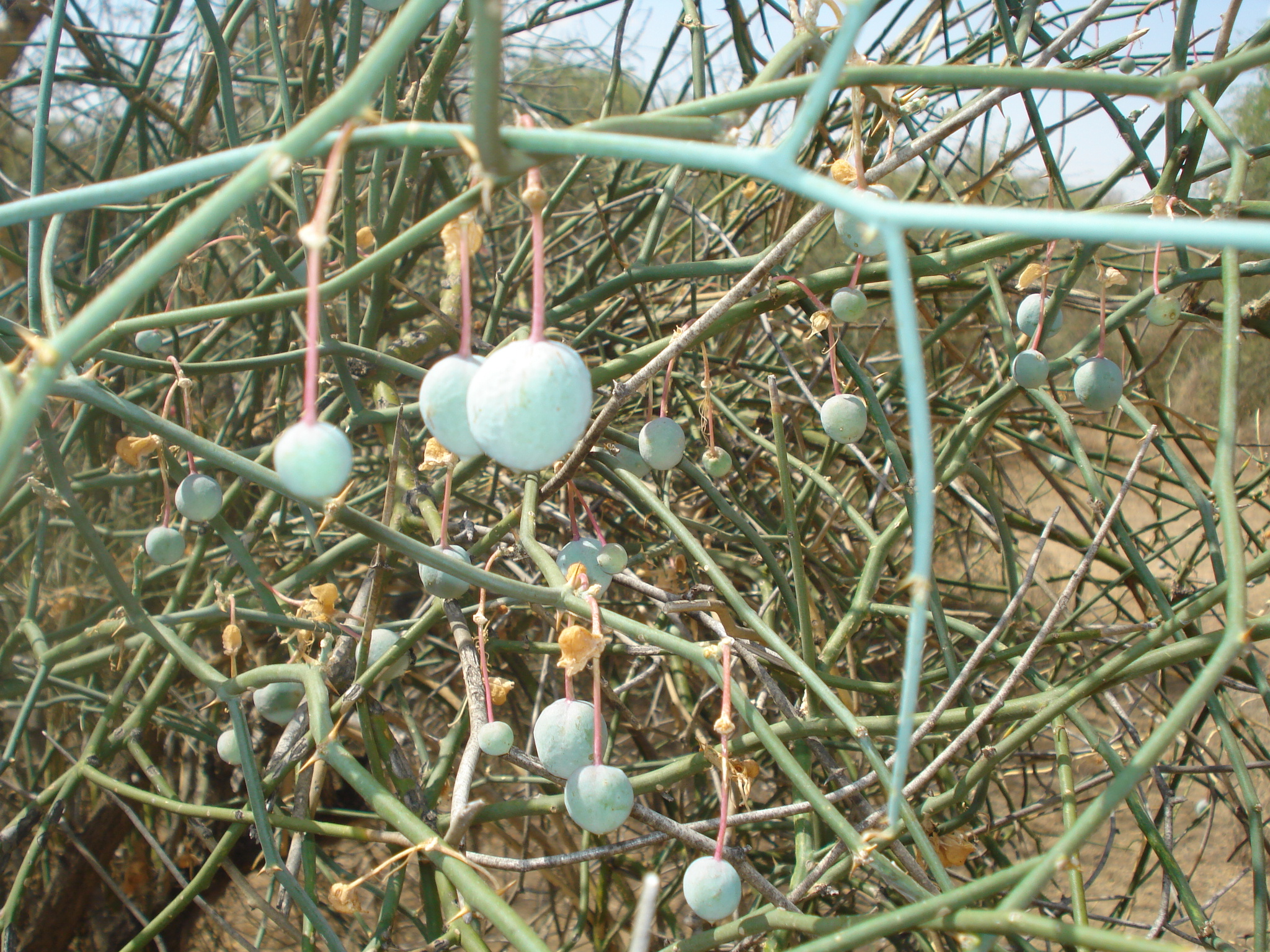
Unripe fruits on the tree

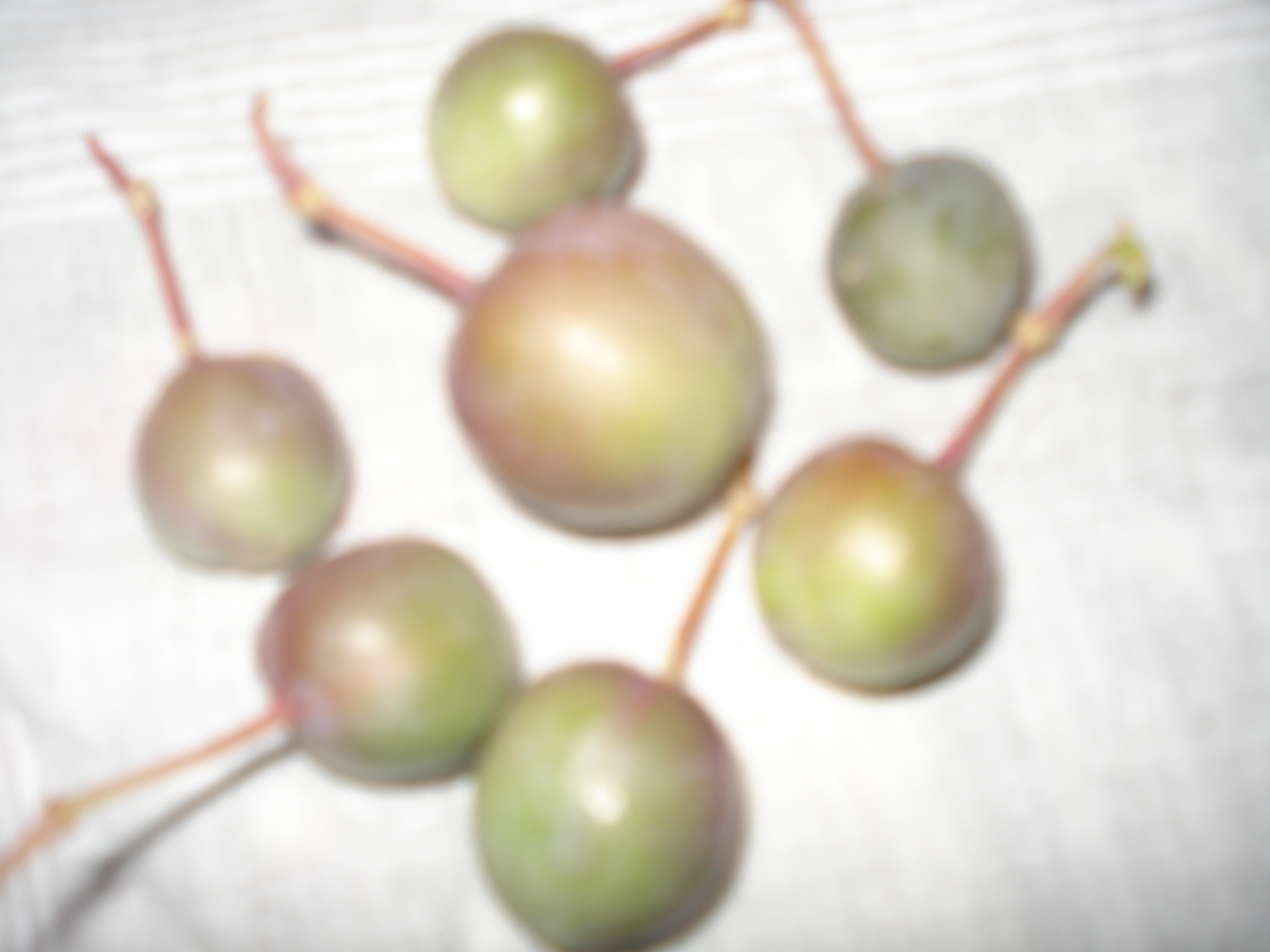
Unripe fruits

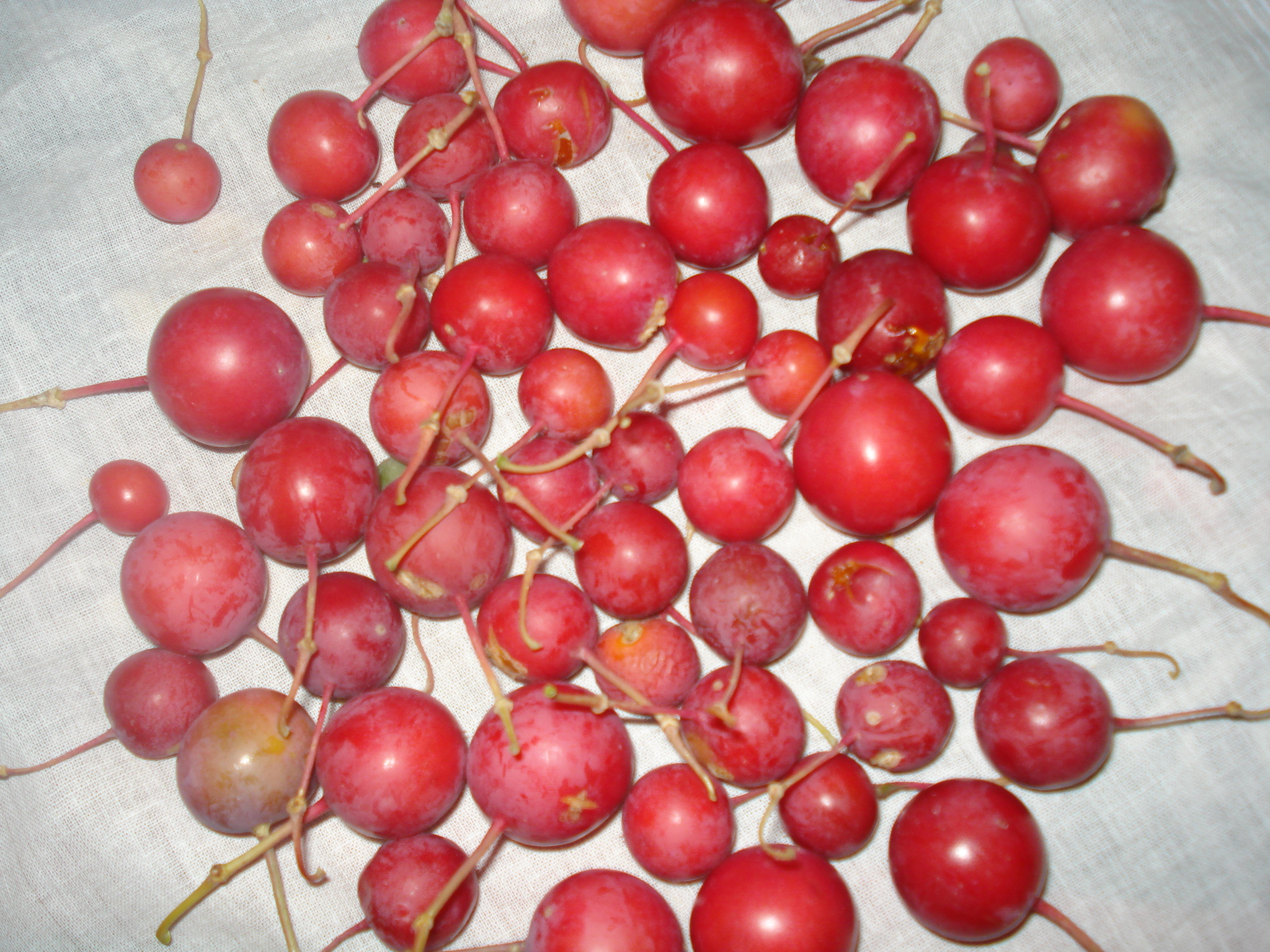
Ripe fruits

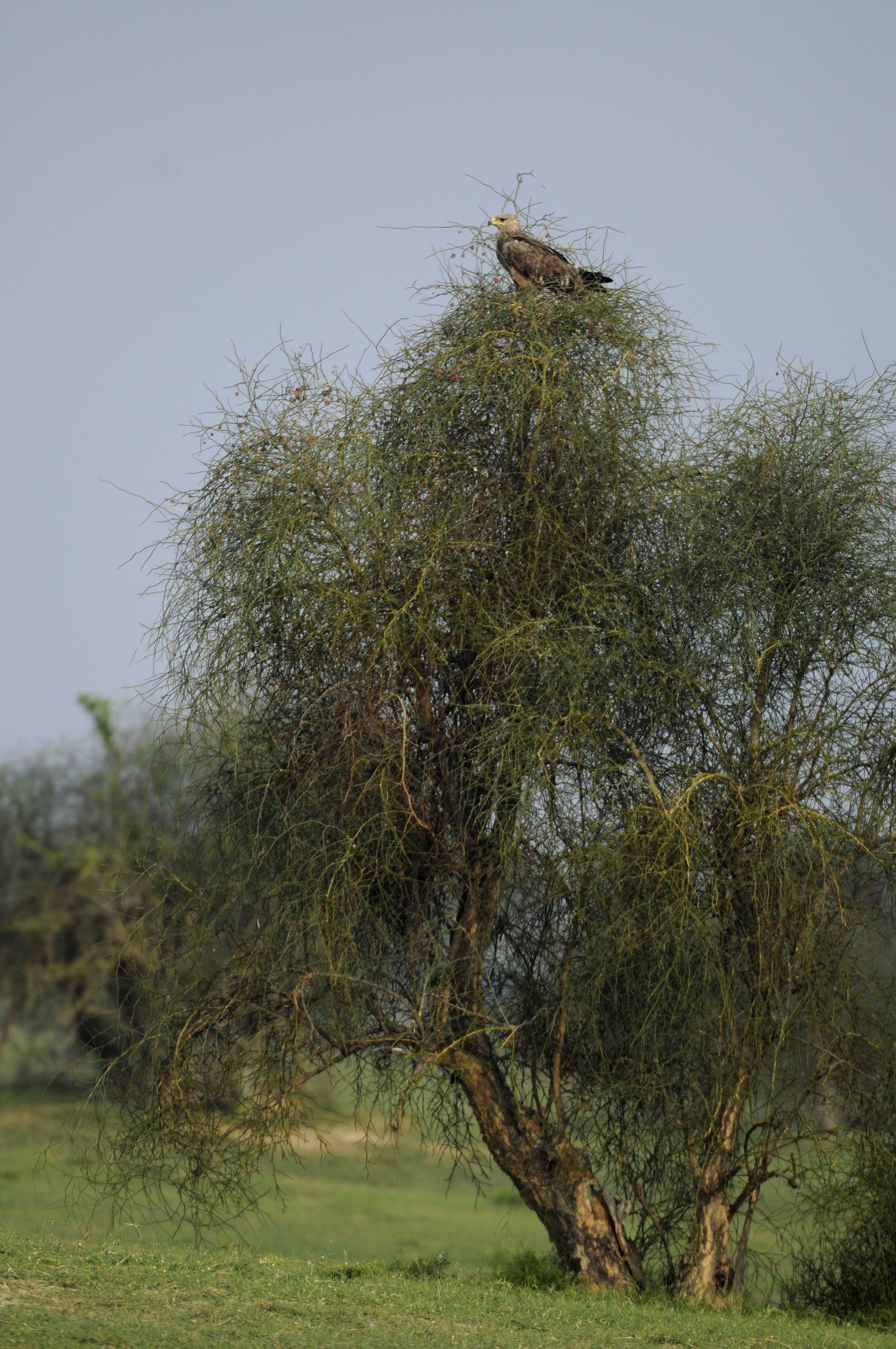
Tawny eagle perched on tree

== Distribution and habitat ==
It can be found in arid regions in North Africa, the West Asia, and South Asia, including the Thar Desert.

Khair city in Uttar Pradesh, India is famous for Kair trees.

== Cultivation and uses ==
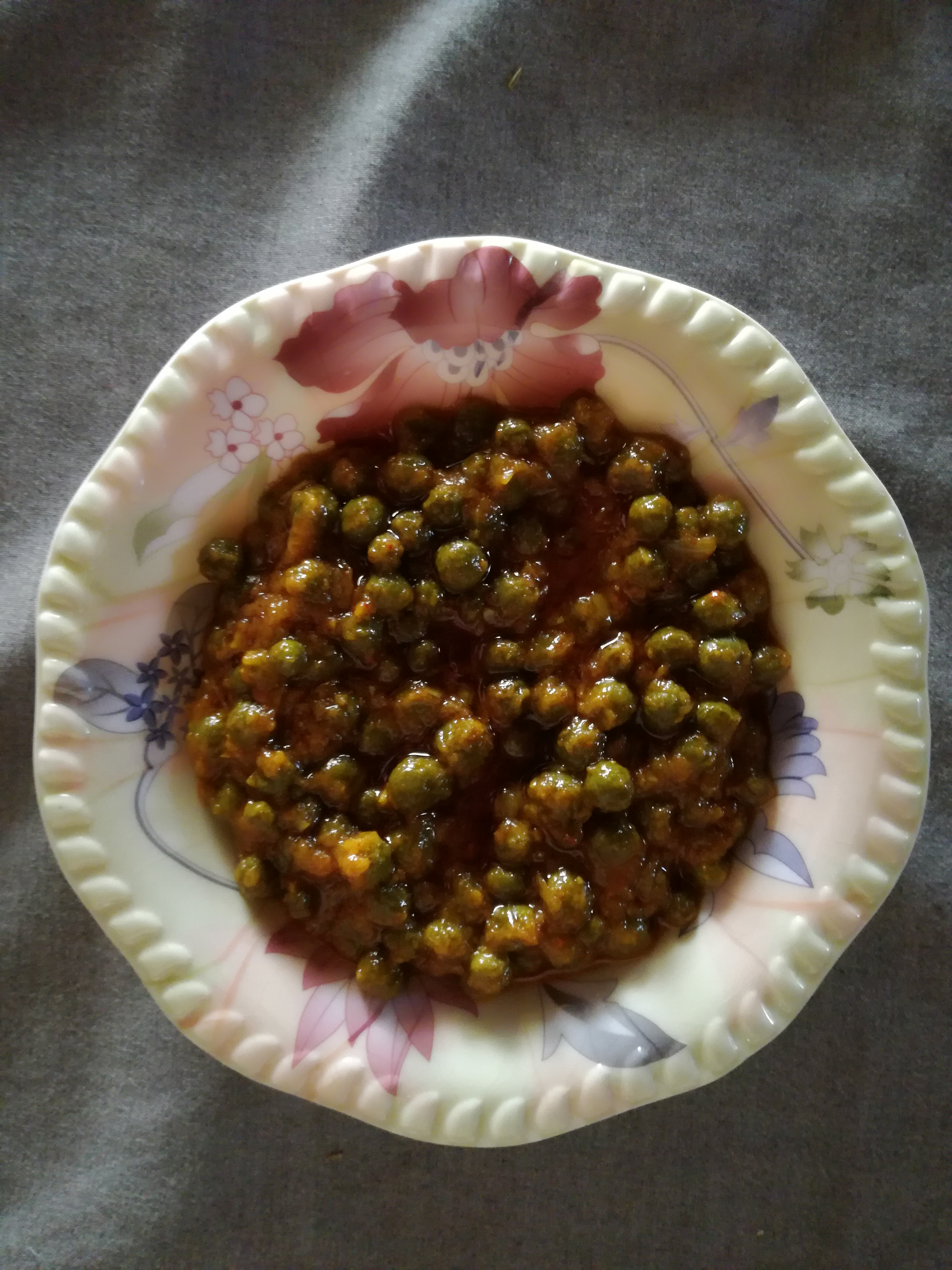
Vegetable dish of cooked kair berry in Tharparkar, Sindh

The fruit and young buds can be eaten raw.

Its spicy fruits are used for preparing vegetables, curry and fine pickles and can attract helpful insectivores; the plant also is used in folk medicine and herbalism. It can be used in landscape gardening, afforestation and reforestation in semidesert and desert areas; it provides assistance against soil erosion.
