= National Highway 701 (India) =

National highway in India

National Highway 701
- Map of the National Highway in red

Route information
- Auxiliary route of NH 1
- Maintained by BRO
- Length: 126 km (78 mi)

Major junctions
- East end: NH 1 in Baramulla
- West end: Tangdhar

Location
- Country: India
- States: Jammu & Kashmir
- Primary destinations: Baramulla, Rafiabad, Kupwara, Tangdhar

Highway system
- Roads in India; Expressways; National; State; Asian
← NH 501	→ NH 701A

National Highway 701, commonly referred to as NH 701 is a national highway in India. It is a spur road of National Highway 1. NH-701 traverses the union territory of Jammu and Kashmir in India.

== Route description ==
Baramulla - Rafiabad - Kupwara - Tangdhar .

== Major intersections ==
NH 1 Terminal near Baramula.

== Tunnel ==
Sadhna Pass Tunnel in being planned. See also Tunnels in North West India.

== See also ==
- List of national highways in India
- List of national highways in India by state
