= Kupwara district =

Kupwara district Kopwor
- District of Indian-administered Jammu and Kashmir
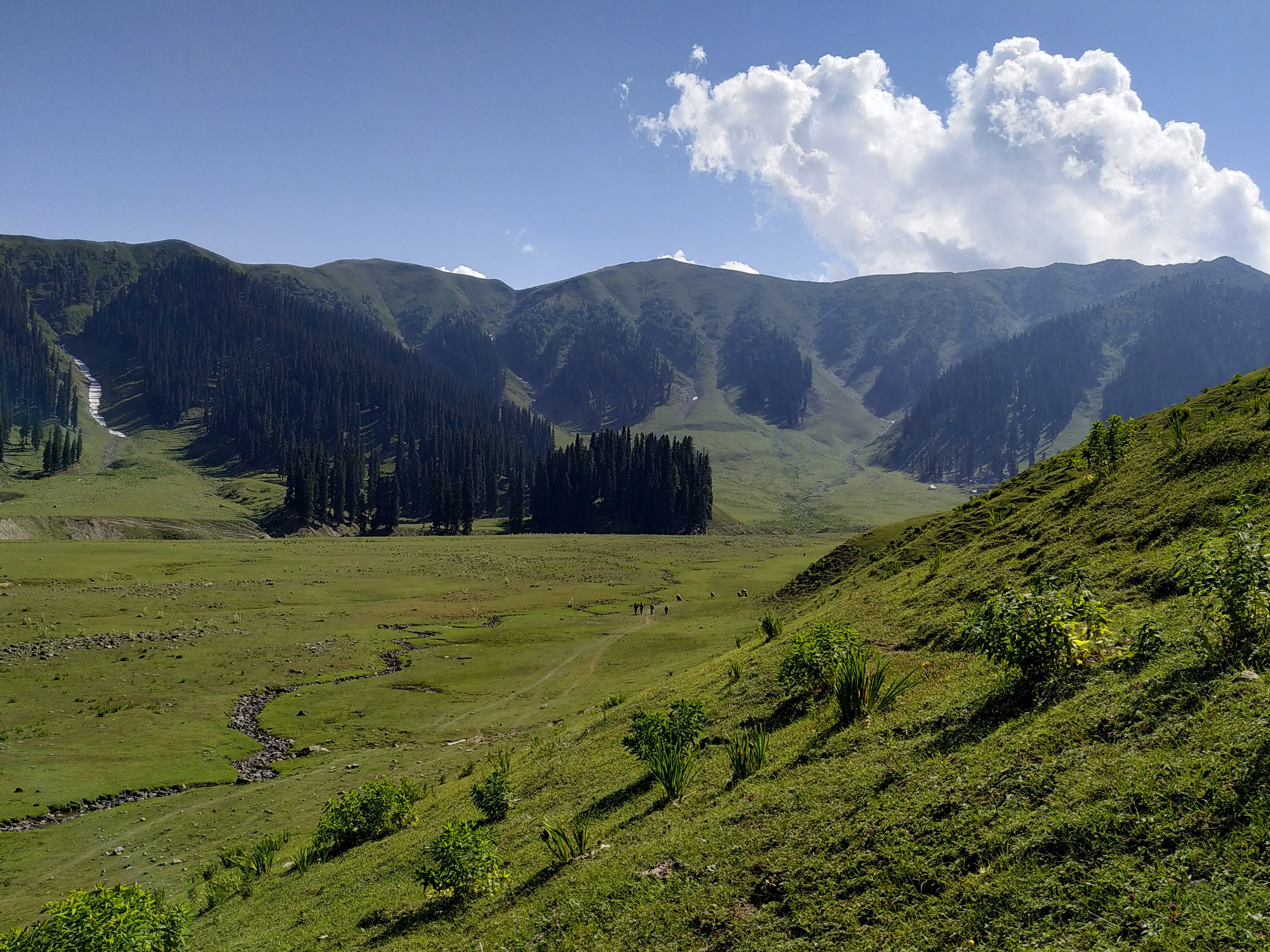
- Bangus Valley in Kupwara

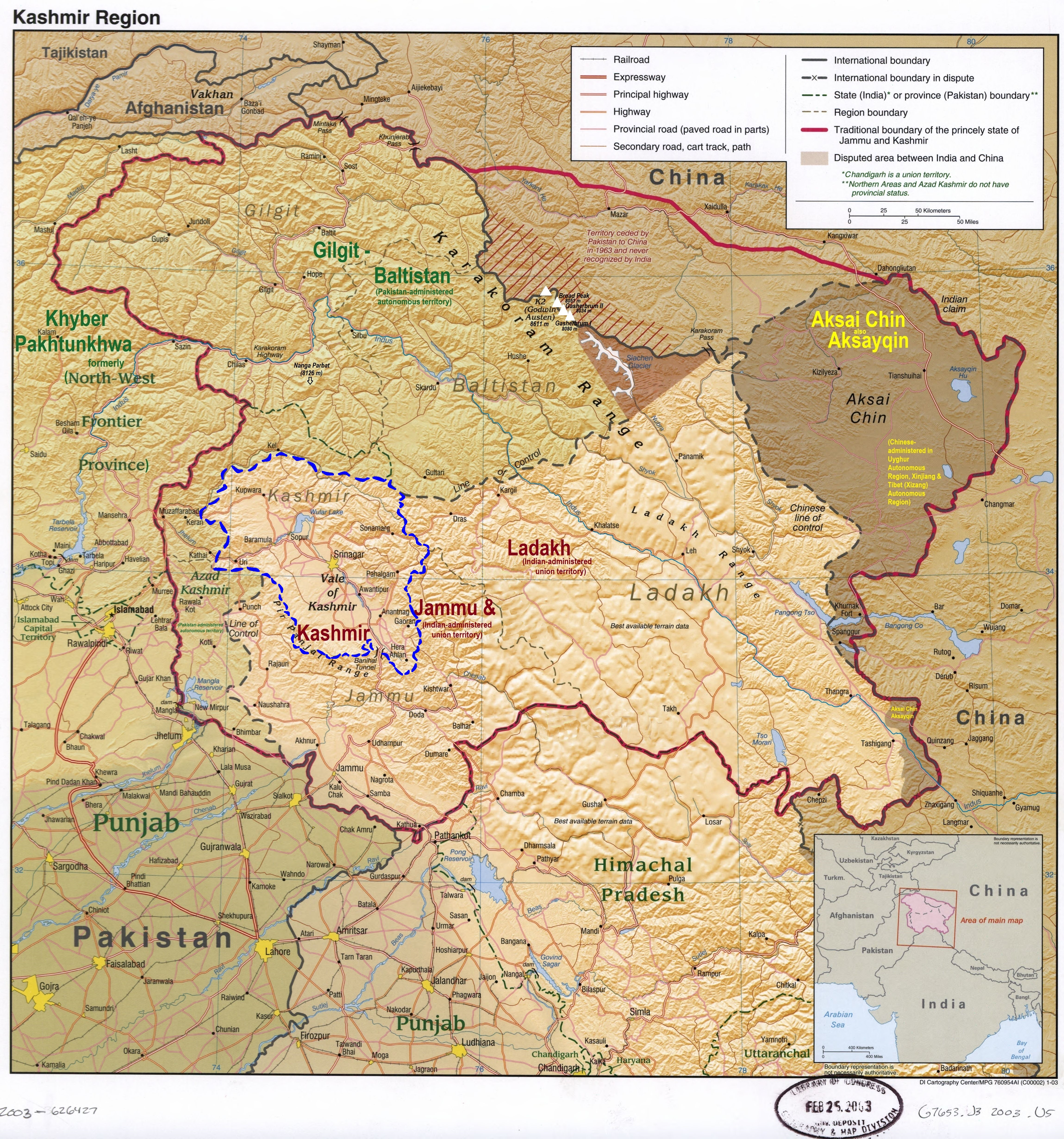
- Kupwara district is in Indian-administered Jammu and Kashmir in the disputed Kashmir region It is in the Kashmir division (bordered in neon blue).
- Interactive map of Kupwara district
- Coordinates (Kupwara): 34°37′N 74°13′E
- Administering country: India
- Union Territory: Jammu and Kashmir
- Division: Kashmir Division
- Established: 1979
- Headquarters: Kupwara

Government
  - Lok Sabha Constituency: Baramulla
  - MP: Engineer Rashid
  - Vidhan Sabha Constituencies: 6 : Karnah, Trehgam, Kupwara, Lolab, Handwara and Langate

Area
  - Total: 2,379 km^{2} (919 sq mi)
  - Urban: 47.3 km^{2} (18.3 sq mi)
  - Rural: 2,331.7 km^{2} (900.3 sq mi)

Population (2011)
  - Total: 870,354
  - Density: 365.8/km^{2} (947.5/sq mi)
  - Urban: 104,729
  - Rural: 765,625

Demographics
  - Literacy: 64.51%
  - Sex ratio: 835 ♀/ 1000 ♂

Languages
  - Official: Kashmiri, Urdu, Hindi, Dogri, English
  - Spoken: Gujari, Pahari
- Time zone: UTC+05:30 (IST)
- Vehicle registration: JK-09
- Major highways: NH 701
- Website: kupwara.nic.in

Kupwara district is an administrative district of Indian-administered Jammu and Kashmir in the disputed Kashmir region. It is one of the 10 districts located in the Kashmir Valley Division of Indian administered Kashmir. The Pohru River (originating in Lolab Valley and flowing from east to west) and Mawar river are two main rivers in the district. Both of them meet Jhelum river in Baramulla district.

== History ==
The district was carved out of the erstwhile Baramulla district in 1979 with Kupwara Town as the district headquarters.

== Demographics ==
=== Population ===
Historical population
Year	Pop.	±% p.a.
1901	110,979	—
1911	124,744	+1.18%
1921	137,936	+1.01%
1931	153,758	+1.09%
1941	170,079	+1.01%
1951	187,076	+0.96%
1961	204,073	+0.87%
1971	257,824	+2.37%
1981	328,743	+2.46%
1991	465,948	+3.55%
2001	650,393	+3.39%
2011	870,354	+2.96%

According to the 2011 census Kupwara district has a population of 870,354. This gives it a ranking of 470th in India (out of a total of 640). The district has a population density of 368 inhabitants per square kilometre (950/sq mi). Its population growth rate over the decade 2001–2011 was 34.62%.

=== Ethnic groups ===
Kashmiri and Gujjar are two major groups in Kupwara district. As per 1999 estimates, Gujjar made up 32.18% of the district's total population, with a population of 1,50,000.

=== Language ===
Languages of Kupwara district (2011)
1. Kashmiri (71.1%)
2. Pahari (14.1%)
3. Gujari (9.21%)
4. Hindi (2.70%)
5. Others (2.86%)

At the time of the 2011 census, 71.11% of the population spoke Kashmiri, 14.12% Pahari, 9.21% Gujari and 2.70% Hindi as their first language. Urdu is widely-spoken as a second language. Kashmiri is spoken throughout the district, while Pahari-Pothwari is the predominant language in Karnah tehsil along the Line of Control.

=== Religion ===
Religion in Kupwara district (2011)
Religion	Percent
Islam	94.59%
Hinduism	4.27%
Sikhism	0.64%
Other or not stated	0.50%

=== Literacy rate and Sex ratio ===
Kupwara has a sex ratio of 843 females for every 1000 males (this varies with religion), and a literacy rate of 75.60% Scheduled Castes and Scheduled Tribes make up 0.12% and 8.08% of the population respectively.

Sex Ratio in Kupwara District in 2011 Census. (no. females per 1,000 males)
Religion (and population)	Sex Ratio
Muslim (pop 823,286)	912
Hindu (pop 37,128)	30
Sikh (pop 5,600)	162
Other (pop 1,818)	395
Not stated (pop 2,522)	695
Total (pop 870,354)	835

Kupwara district: religion, gender ratio, and % urban of population, according to the 2011 Census.
	Hindu	Muslim	Christian	Sikh	Buddhist	Jain	Other	Not stated	Total
Total	37,128	823,286	1,700	5,600	66	39	13	2,522	870,354
Total	4.27%	94.59%	0.20%	0.64%	0.01%	0.00%	0.00%	0.29%	100.00%
Male	36,057	430,521	1,215	4,821	51	28	9	1,488	474,190
Female	1,071	392,765	485	779	15	11	4	1,034	396,164
Gender ratio (% female)	2.9%	47.7%	28.5%	13.9%	22.7%	28.2%	30.8%	41.0%	45.5%
Sex ratio (no. of females per 1,000 males)	30	912	399	162	–	–	–	695	835
Urban	9,460	93,355	369	1,123	20	6	8	388	104,729
Rural	27,668	729,931	1,331	4,477	46	33	5	2,134	765,625
% Urban	25.5%	11.3%	21.7%	20.1%	30.3%	15.4%	61.5%	15.4%	12.0%

== Geography ==
Kupwara district has a total area of 2,379 square kilometres (919 sq mi). The district is bordered by Bandipora district in the east, Baramulla district to the south and Pakistan-administrated Azad Jammu and Kashmir(AJK) to the north and west. The district is mostly rural/agricultural.

=== Adjacent districts ===
- Bandipora district, Indian administered Kashmir – east
- Neelum district, Pakistan administered Azad Jammu and Kashmir (AJK) – northeast and northwest
- Muzaffarabad district and Hattian Bala district, Pakistan administered Azad Jammu and Kashmir (AJK) – west
- Baramulla district, Indian administered Kashmir – south

== Economy ==
Most of the people depend on agriculture and horticulture. There is a good production and business of walnuts in Kupwara.

The Department of Horticulture have developed a high density walnut nursery in Kupwara.

== Transportation ==
=== Air ===
The nearest airport is Sheikh ul-Alam International Airport in Srinagar located 87 kilometres from district headquarters Kupwara. There are plans to construct an airport in Panzgam.

=== Rail ===
Kupwara district is not yet connected to railways. There are plans to extend the Jammu–Baramulla line up to Kupwara in the near future. The nearest railway station is Baramulla railway station located 45 kilometres from Kupwara.

=== Road ===
Kupwara is well-connected with roads and highways. The NH 701 passes through Kupwara district alongside other intra-district roads.

== Notables ==
- Anwar Shah Kashmiri, Renowned Islamic scholar from Kashmir, known for his expertise in hadith, fiqh, and theology. A key figure at Darul Uloom Deoband.
- Aadil Manzoor Peer, Stock athlete who has represented India internationally with his right-hand playing style.
- Assad Ullah Shah Quit Kashmir Movement leader and former MLA of Kupwara constituency
- Abdul Gani Lone, Kashmiri separatist leader, founder of People’s Conference, assassinated in 2002 for his moderate views.
- Ali Mohammad Shahbaz, Kashmiri poet, satirist, humanist, and philanthropist, whose work focused on the Kashmir conflict.
- Ashraf Sehrai, Separatist leader and chairman of Tehreek-e-Hurriyat, elected after Syed Ali Shah Geelani’s resignation.
- Engineer Rashid, Kashmiri politician, founder of Awami Ittehad Party, and an advocate for Kashmir’s autonomy and self-determination.
- Maqbool Bhat, Kashmiri separatist leader, founder of NLF (JKLF), and was hanged in 1984 for his activism.
- Sajad Gani Lone, Kashmiri politician, leader of the Jammu and Kashmir Peoples Conference, and former minister in the region’s government.
- Shah Faesal, Former IAS topper and founder of Jammu and Kashmir People’s Movement
- Mir Mohammad Fayaz, Formar Rajhya Sabha MP of India, and current MLA of Kupwara constituency

== See also ==
- Jammu and Kashmir
- Kupwara
- Lolab Valley
- Karnah
- Drugmulla
- Tangdhar
- Sogam Lolab
- Sports in Jammu and Kashmir
- Diver Anderbugh
- Bangus Valley
