= Kupwara =

- Town
- Location in Jammu and Kashmir, India Kupwara (India)
- Coordinates: 34°31′33″N 74°15′19″E
- Union Territory: Jammu and Kashmir
- District: Kupwara
- Established: 1979

Government
  - Type: Democratic
  - Body: Municipal council

Area
  - Total: 4.10 km^{2} (1.58 sq mi)
- Elevation: 1,615 m (5,299 ft)

Population (2011)
  - Total: 21,771
  - Density: 5,310/km^{2} (13,800/sq mi)
- Demonym(s): Kupwaran, Kupwari, Kopworan, Kopwori

Demographics
  - Literacy: 72.45%
  - Sex ratio: 956 ♀/ 1000 ♂

Languages
  - Official language: Kashmiri
- Time zone: UTC+5:30 (IST)
- PIN: 193222
- Vehicle registration: JK09
- Website: kupwara.nic.in

Kupwara (Urdu pronunciation: [kʊpʋɑːɽɑː] ; Kashmiri pronunciation: [kɔpʋoːr]) is a city, District headquarter and a municipal council in Kupwara district in the Indian union territory of Jammu and Kashmir.

Municipal council Kupwara is an Urban Local Body with elected members which administers the city Municipality.

== Demographics ==
Historical population
Year	Pop.	±% p.a.
1981	3,072	—
2001	14,857	+8.20%
2011	21,771	+3.90%

As of 2011 India census, Kupwara had a population of 21,771. There were 15,120 males (69%) and 6,651 females (31%). Of the population, 2,093 (9.6%) were age 0-6: 1,082 males (52%) and 1,011 females (48%). The literacy rate for the people over six was 86.6% (males 91.9%, females 73.5%).

=== Religion ===
The dominant religion in Kupwara is Islam, followed by over 98% of the people living in Kupwara. Other religions include Hinduism, and Sikhism followed by 2%

Religion in Kupwara Town (2011)
1. Islam (84.7%)
2. Hinduism (12.8%)
3. Sikhism (1.57%)
4. Christianity (0.36%)
5. Other (0.07%)
6. Not Stated (0.55%)

== Climate ==
Climate data for Kupwara (1991–2020, extremes 1977–2020)
Month	Jan	Feb	Mar	Apr	May	Jun	Jul	Aug	Sep	Oct	Nov	Dec	Year
Record high °C (°F)	16.9 (62.4)	21.4 (70.5)	27.3 (81.1)	31.7 (89.1)	34.8 (94.6)	36.9 (98.4)	37.6 (99.7)	36.7 (98.1)	35.8 (96.4)	33.6 (92.5)	28.6 (83.5)	18.4 (65.1)	37.6 (99.7)
Mean daily maximum °C (°F)	7.5 (45.5)	9.7 (49.5)	15.6 (60.1)	20.9 (69.6)	25.3 (77.5)	28.7 (83.7)	30.8 (87.4)	30.7 (87.3)	28.7 (83.7)	23.8 (74.8)	16.1 (61.0)	10.1 (50.2)	20.6 (69.1)
Mean daily minimum °C (°F)	−2.6 (27.3)	−0.7 (30.7)	2.8 (37.0)	6.6 (43.9)	9.8 (49.6)	13.4 (56.1)	16.9 (62.4)	16.4 (61.5)	11.7 (53.1)	5.2 (41.4)	0.4 (32.7)	−2.3 (27.9)	6.4 (43.5)
Record low °C (°F)	−15.7 (3.7)	−12.0 (10.4)	−7.0 (19.4)	0.1 (32.2)	0.6 (33.1)	6.5 (43.7)	9.0 (48.2)	8.6 (47.5)	4.0 (39.2)	−1.5 (29.3)	−5.5 (22.1)	−9.4 (15.1)	−15.7 (3.7)
Average rainfall mm (inches)	103.3 (4.07)	140.4 (5.53)	190.0 (7.48)	148.2 (5.83)	89.6 (3.53)	58.8 (2.31)	78.7 (3.10)	69.4 (2.73)	42.7 (1.68)	38.8 (1.53)	56.3 (2.22)	53.3 (2.10)	1,046.5 (41.20)
Average rainy days	7.5	9.5	9.5	9.0	6.9	5.2	5.6	4.8	3.2	2.9	3.4	4.0	71.4
Average relative humidity (%) (at 17:30 IST)	77	73	65	62	59	57	59	61	58	58	67	73	64
Source: India Meteorological Department

== Transport ==
=== Air ===
Kupwara doesn't have its own airport. But the helipads are located in Zangli, Drugmulla and Kunan village at a distance of 1 & 2 kilometres from Kupwara respectively. The nearest airport is Srinagar International Airport located at a distance of 94 kilometres and is a two and a half an hour drive. There are plans to build an airport in Kupwara at Panzgam.

=== Rail ===
Kupwara doesn't have railway connectivity yet. The nearest railway stations are Baramulla railway station and Sopore railway station, located 42 and 50 kilometres from Kupwara respectively. There are plans to connect Kupwara by rail by extending the Jammu–Baramulla Rail Line up to Kupwara.

=== Road ===
Kupwara is well-connected by road to other towns and villages in J&K and India by the Sopore-Kupwara Road, Kupwara-Trehgam Road, etc. The NH 701 passes through Kupwara.

== See also ==
- Sportspeople_from_Jammu_and_Kashmir
- Lolab Valley
- Basera E Tabassum
- Kupwara district
- Sports in Jammu and Kashmir
- Adhik Kadam
- Sogam Lolab
- Diver Anderbugh
