= Wagoora–Kreeri Assembly constituency =

Constituency of the Jammu and Kashmir legislative assembly in India

Wagoora–Kreeri
- Constituency for the Jammu and Kashmir Legislative Assembly

Constituency details
- Country: India
- State: Jammu and Kashmir
- District: Baramulla
- Lok Sabha constituency: Baramulla
- Established: 2022
- Total electors: 72,173
- Reservation: None

Member of Legislative Assembly
- Incumbent Irfan Hafiz Lone
- Party: Indian National Congress
- Elected year: 2024

Wagoora–Kreeri is one of the 90 constituencies in the Jammu and Kashmir Legislative Assembly of Jammu and Kashmir a north state of India. Wagoora–Kreeri is also part of Baramulla Lok Sabha constituency.

The Wagoora-Kreeri constituency includes parts of Tangmarg, Wagoora, Kreeri, and Khoi. 98 polling stations have been designated for the constituency while 72,173 voters including 32,669 males, 35501 females, and three transgender voters are registered in the constituency as per 2024 Elections.

== Members of Legislative Assembly ==
Year	Member	Party
2024	Irfan Hafiz Lone	Indian National Congress

== Election results ==
=== Assembly Election 2024 ===
2024 Jammu and Kashmir Legislative Assembly election : Wagoora–Kreeri
Party	Candidate	Votes	%	±%
INC	Irfan Hafiz Lone	17,002	38.17%	New
JKPDP	Syed Basharat Ahmed Bukhari	9,251	20.77%	New
Independent	Naseer Ahmad Rather	6,355	14.27%	New
JD(U)	Rehana Begum	2,587	5.81%	New
JKAP	Shabir Ahmad Shah	2,219	4.98%	New
Independent	Safina Baig	1,699	3.81%	New
DPAP	Syed Abas Hussain	1,602	3.60%	New
NOTA	None of the Above	1,313	2.95%	New
Margin of victory		7,751	17.40%	
Turnout		44,545	61.72%	
Registered electors		72,173		
INC win (new seat)				

== See also ==
- List of constituencies of the Jammu and Kashmir Legislative Assembly
