= Salamabad Dachhna =

Village in Jammu and Kashmir, India

Salamabad Dachna Salamabad Dachina
- Village
- Location in Jammu and Kashmir, India Salamabad Dachna (India)
- Coordinates: 34°6′15″N 74°6′0″E
- Country: India
- Union Territory: Jammu and Kashmir
- District: Baramulla
- Tehsil: Boniyar

Area
  - Total: 797.2 ha (1,970 acres)

Population (2011)
  - Total: 3,605
  - Density: 452.2/km^{2} (1,171/sq mi)

Languages
  - Official: Kashmiri
- Time zone: UTC+5:30 (IST)
- PIN: 193122
- Vehicle registration: JK05
- DIGIPIN: CJP-6P3-PCFK

Salamabad Dachna (/səˈlɑːmɑːbɑːd ˈdɑːtʃna/ also spelled Dachhna or Dachina ) is a village in the Boniyar tehsil of Baramulla district in the northwestern Indian-administered union territory of Jammu and Kashmir. It lies approximately 9.3 km from Boniyar and 26 km from the district headquarters, Baramulla. The nearest major town is Uri, located 25 km away.

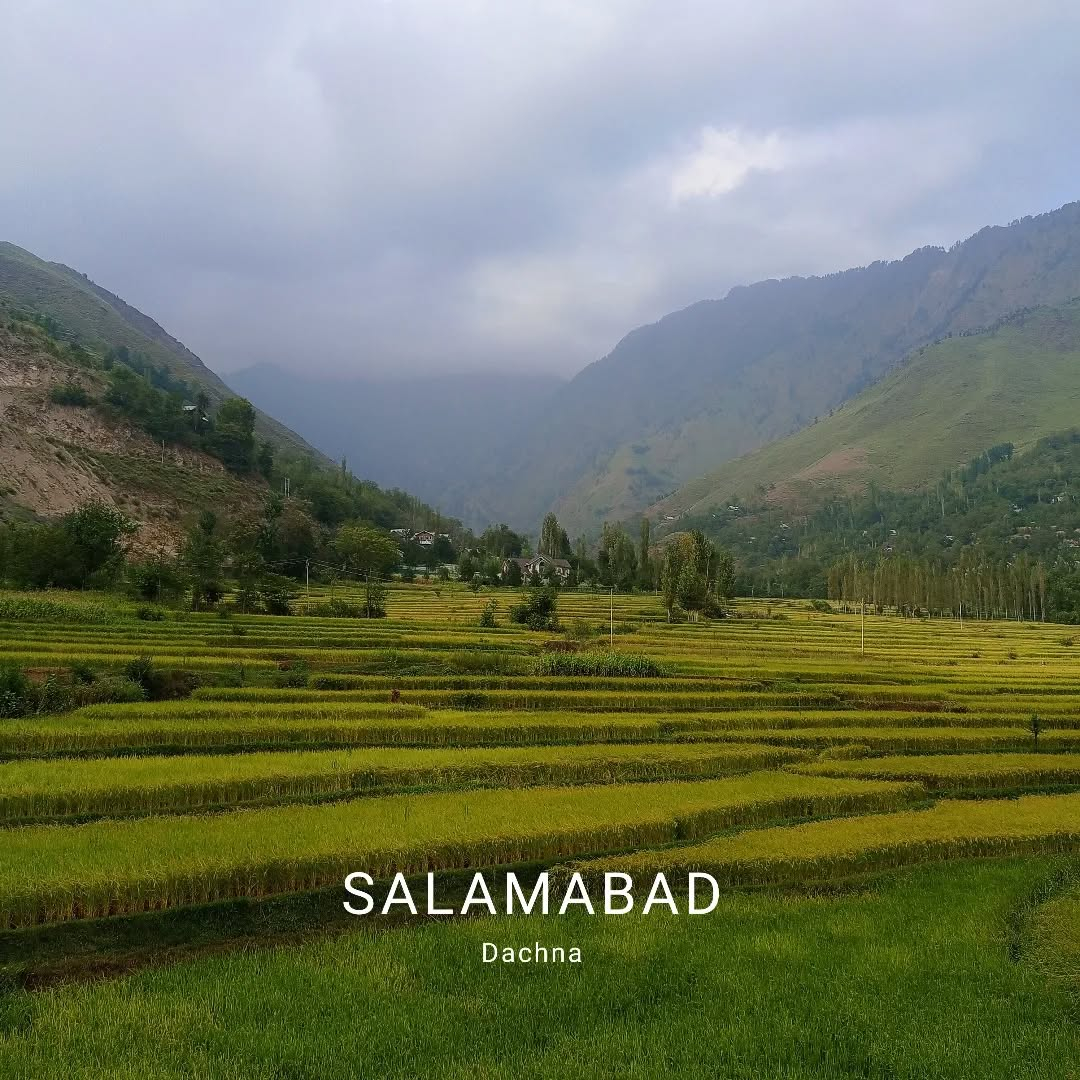
Crops in Salamabad Dachina village, Baramulla

== Geography ==
Salamabad Dachina covers an area of 797.2 hectares and is situated in a hilly region of northwestern Jammu and Kashmir. It is located about 14 km from the Lachipora Wildlife Sanctuary. The village's postal code is 193122.

The village is divided into two local sectors or habitations: Salamabad A (Saran) and Salamabad B (Dachina/Proper). Each sector contains one of the village's two Jamia mosques; Jamia Masjid Shahi Hamdan is located in Salamabad A, while Jamia Masjid Al-Tawheed Akbar lies in Salamabad B.

Salamabad Dachina and its neighbour village Bijhama are known for many tourist destinations.

== Demographics ==
According to the 2011 Census of India, Salamabad Dachina has a population of 3,605, residing in 636 households. Of these, 1,882 are male and 1,723 are female, resulting in a sex ratio of 915 females per 1,000 males. Children aged 0–6 years number 827, or 22.9% of the total population.

The overall literacy rate stands at 36.78%, with male literacy at 46.81% and female literacy at 25.83%. The village also has a Scheduled Tribe population of 474. Data for Scheduled Castes is not reported.

Demographic Summary (2011 Census)
Category	Total	Male	Female
Population	3,605	1,882	1,723
Children (0–6 years)	827	450	377
Scheduled Tribes	474	253	221
Literates	1,326	881	445
Illiterates	2,279	1,001	1,278

== Language and religion ==
The primary language spoken in the village is Kashmiri, followed by Pahari and Gujari. It is a monoreligious Islamic region.

== Governance ==
Salamabad Dachina is administered by a local Gram Panchayat, and falls under the Uri constituenc]y for both the Jammu and Kashmir Legislative Assembly and Indian Parliament elections.

== Education ==
The village has several government and private schools offering education from primary to secondary levels:

- High School Salamabad
- Al Noor Public School (Private)
- Middle School Lagama
- Primary School Gojer Pathi
- Primary School Naik Mohalla
- Primary School Daber Pathi

== Connectivity ==
According to the 2011 census:

- Public bus services are available beyond 10 km
- Private vehicles operate within the village
- The nearest railway station is in Baramulla, approximately 40 km away.

== Nearby villages ==
Salamabad Dachina is surrounded by the following villages:

- Braripora
- Bijhama
- Sheerwanipora
- Bagnah Noorkhah
- Limber
- Kanchan

== In the media ==
In 2023, Salamabad Dachina appeared in regional news when residents protested against rampant gypsum mining activities in the area, citing environmental and health concerns.

== Gallery ==
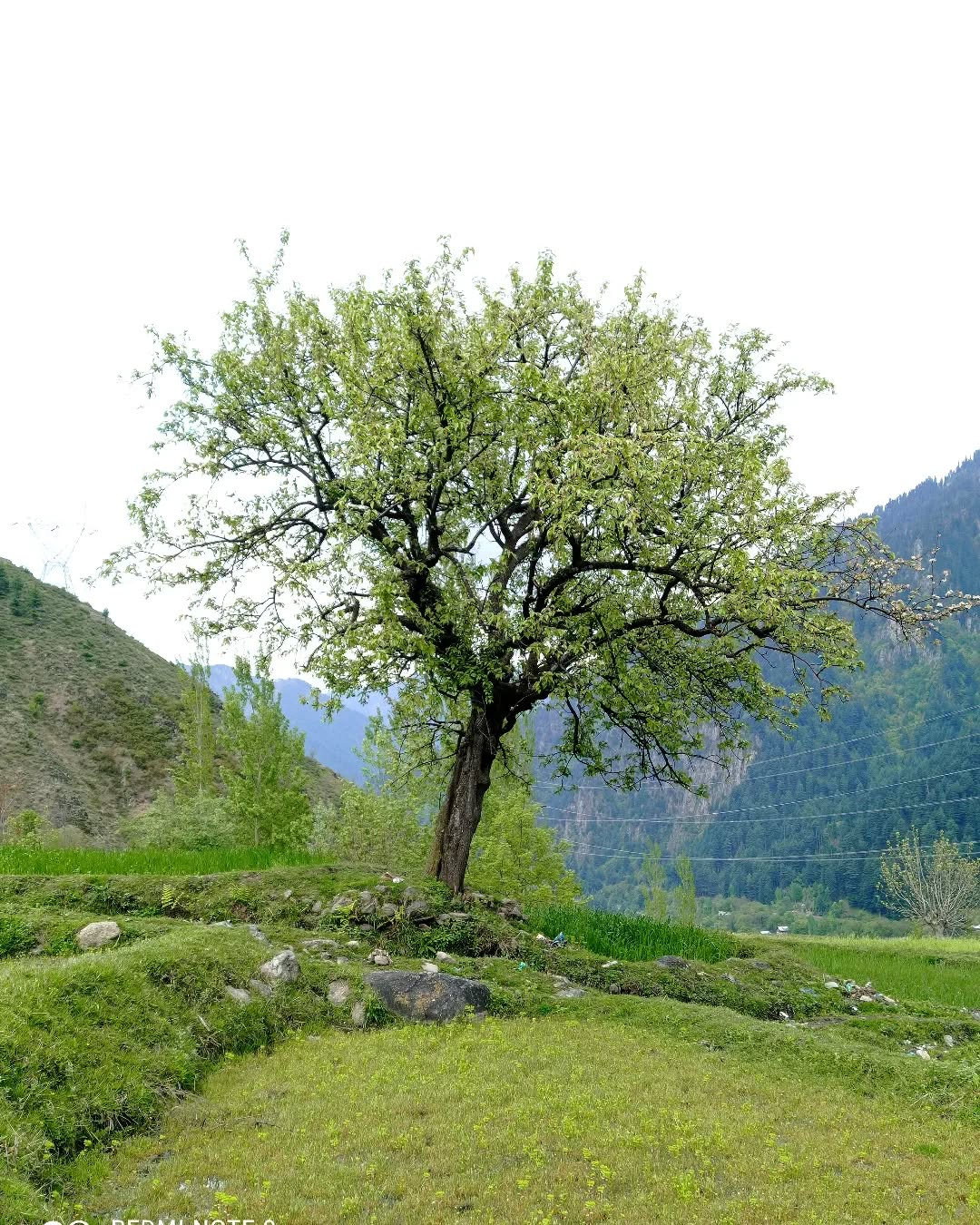
Indigenous flora flourishing in Salamabad's temperate microclimate

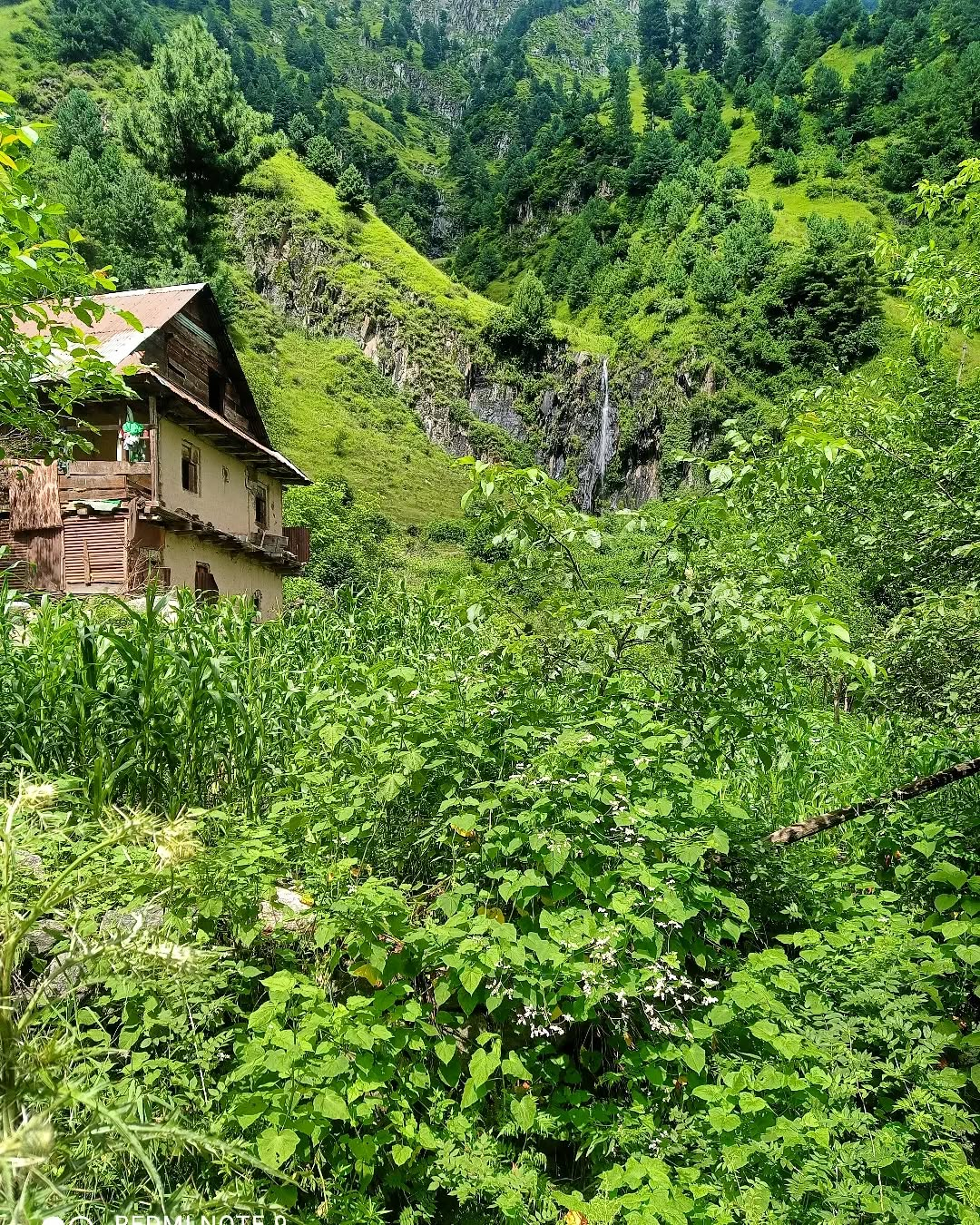
A traditional pastoral hut beside a natural spring, reflecting rural architecture

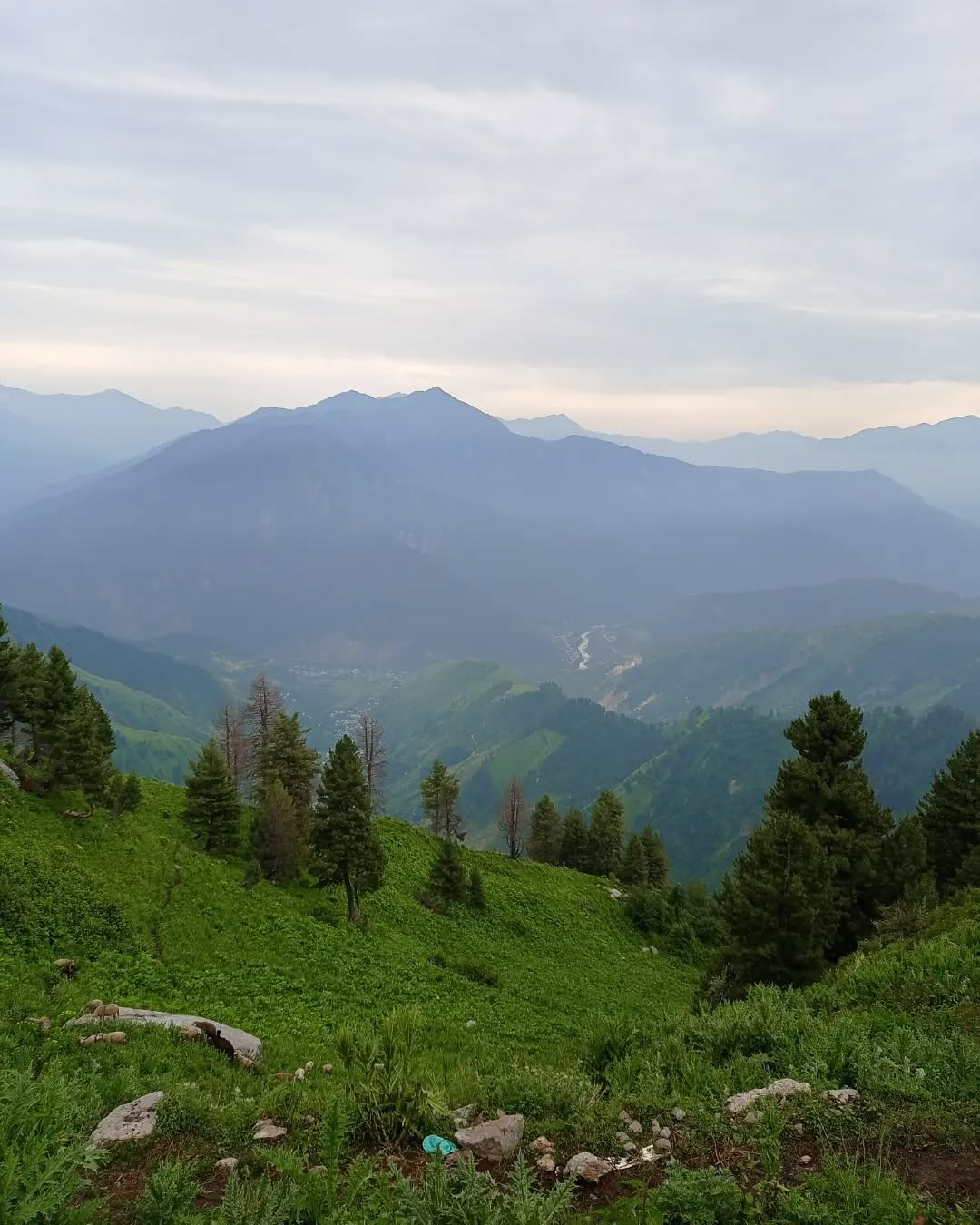
Aerial perspective capturing the topography and clustered habitation

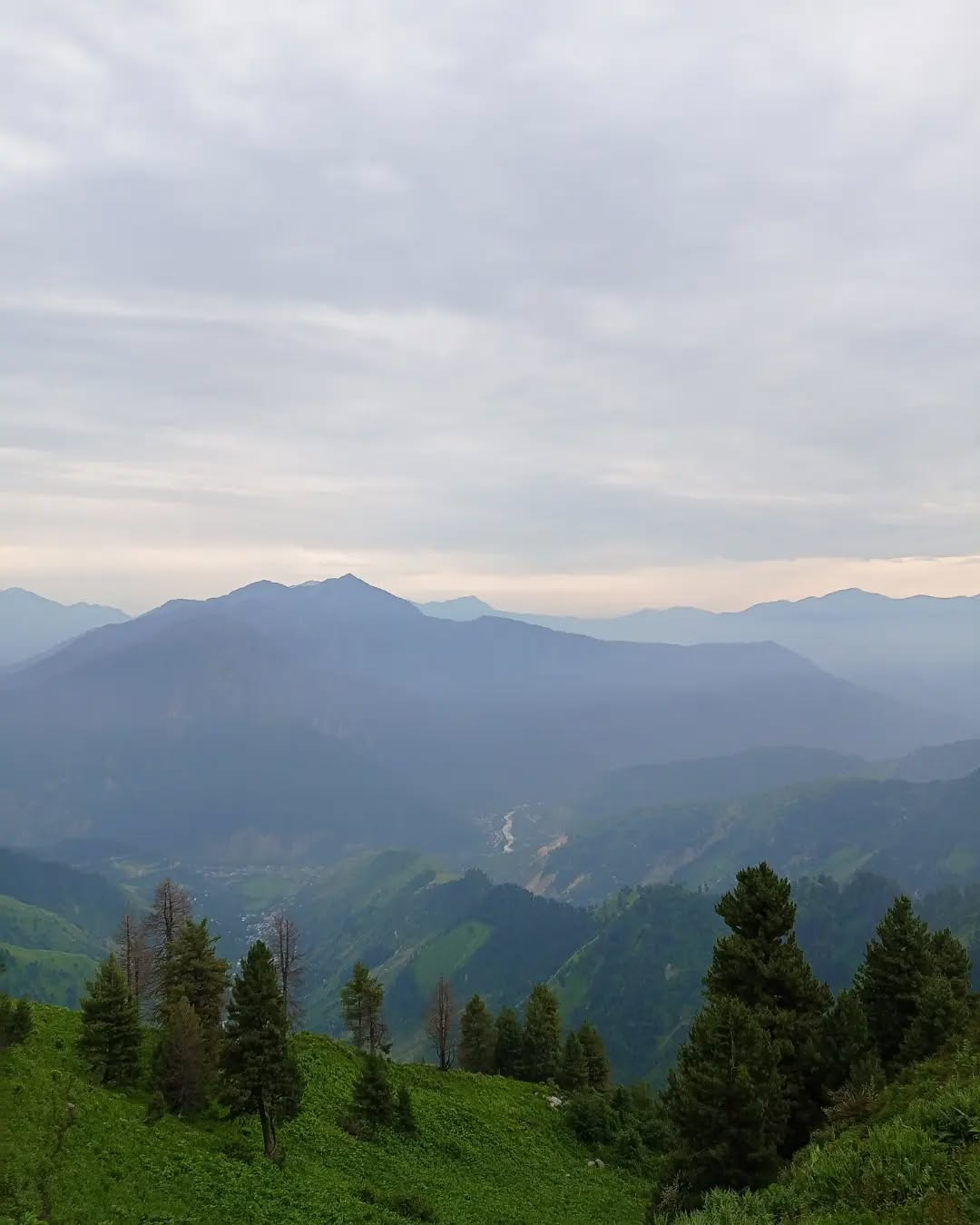
Bird's-eye view of Salamabad Dachhna nestled in the northwestern Kashmir valley

== See also ==
- Baramulla district
- Boniyar
- Uri, Jammu and Kashmir
