= Sheeri, Baramulla =

Village Block in Jammu & Kashmir, India

Sheeri
- Village Representation.
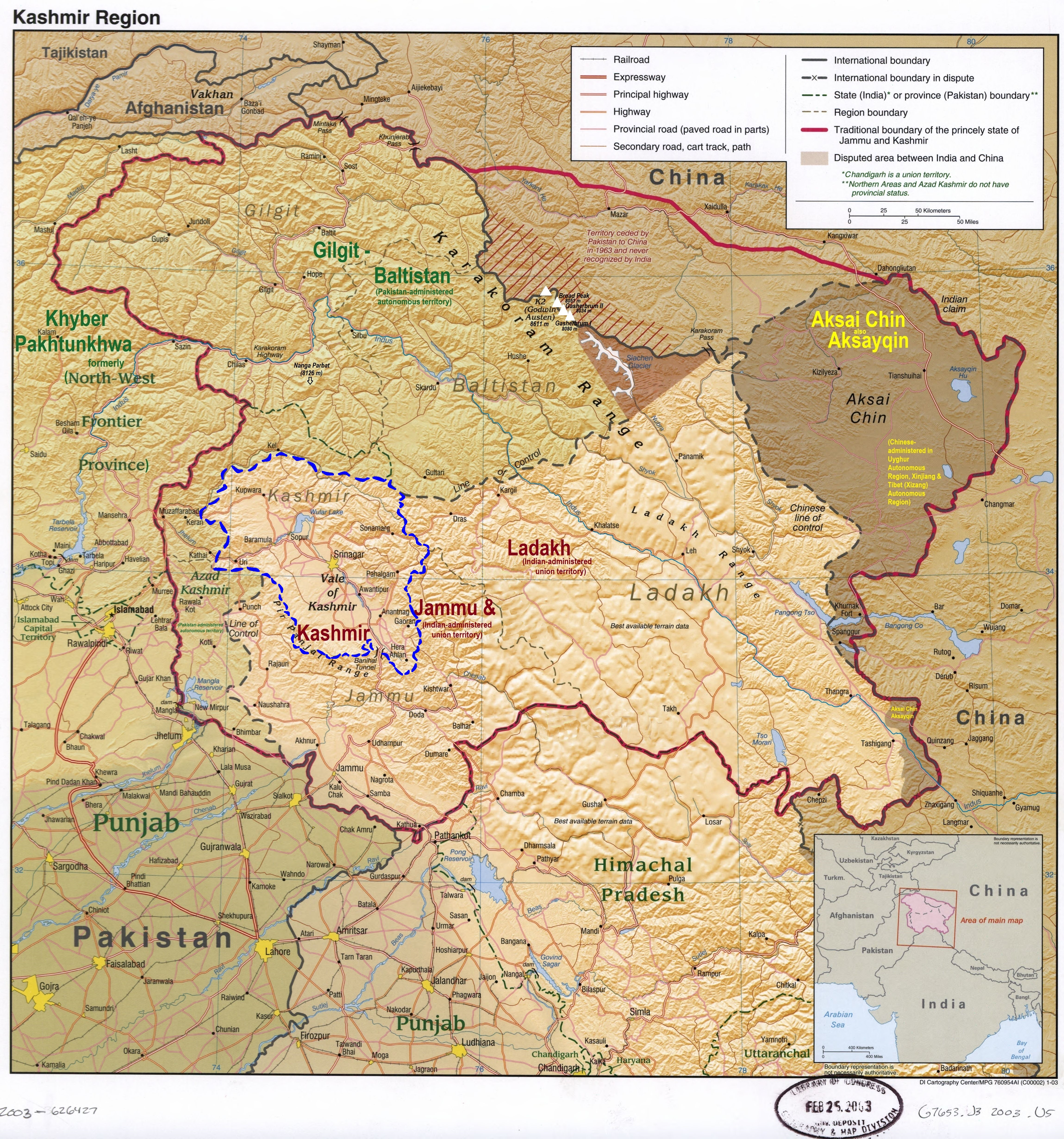
- Sheeri lies in Baramulla, which lies in the Kashmir division (neon blue) of the Indian-administered Jammu and Kashmir (shaded tan) in the disputed Kashmir region.
- Coordinates: 34°11′01″N 74°18′35″E
- Administering country: India

Languages
  - Official: Kashmiri, Urdu, English
- Time zone: UTC+5:30 (IST)
- PIN: 193103, 193101 (Baramulla City)
- Telephone code +91: 01952
- Vehicle registration: JK-05
- Website: thevarmul.wixstudio.io/varmul

Sheeri is a village located in Baramulla district of Jammu and Kashmir. The village has two adjoining areas namely "Sheeri Bala" and "Sheeri Payeen". It is located 10 km towards the west of the district headquarters Baramulla and 52 km from the state capital Srinagar. Sheeri is surrounded by Singhpora Tehsil to the east, Rohama Tehsil to the north, Kralpora Tehsil to the south and Boniyar Tehsil to the west.

The town is situated along the Jhelum River and is surrounded by mountainous terrain. Historically, it served as a point along a major route connecting the western regions with the Kashmir Valley, contributing to its geographical and strategic significance.

It begins from a curve following the "Batt Colony", the curve is known as "Dana Ka Moad" i.e., The Curve of Brilliance. Soon enough your eyes glide over the Jhelum to the mountains ahead that separate the Narvaw area from the other world.

One of the notable places is the Eco Park surrounded by Jhelum like an island.

The Sheeri Market serves local residents as well as visitors from neighboring communities.

There are vast orchids mostly, apples and fields of paddy in Sheeri. Walter Roper Lawrence, in his book "Valley of Kashmir", has talked about this place and is believed to have travelled here and researched much.

To the south of this village lie a conjunction of villages and beauties, which are part of the Narvaw area. This area also includes mountains leading to southeastern villages like Heewan and Kalyan, which ultimately lead to Gulmarg. From the mid southern part lie villages like Fatehgarh (Historic Landmark), Malpora and Dangerpira which will also lead the traveller to Gulmarg and other fantasies. On the south-western side lie villages like Zogiyar, Zandfarn and Badmulla which subsequently track towards one of the Kashmir's Beautiful but unpopular Places called "Goas". That place is a Dream.

The western part of Sheeri is paved on the banks of Jhelum and the national highway, leading to Gantamulla (I Call it the British Project) then to Uri after a long trip.
