= Sangrama Assembly constituency =

Constituency of the Jammu and Kashmir Legislative Assembly

Coordinates: 34.23°N 74.47°E

Sangrama
- Former constituency for the Jammu and Kashmir Legislative Assembly

Constituency details
- Country: India
- State: Jammu and Kashmir
- District: Baramulla
- Established: 1962
- Abolished: 2018

Sangrama was a legislative constituency in the Jammu and Kashmir Legislative Assembly. It was a part of Baramulla Lok Sabha Constituency.

It consisted of Wagoora, Kreeri and Khoie Tehsils.

== Members of the Legislative Assembly ==
| Election | Member | Party |
|---|---|---|
| 1977 | Ghulam Rasool Bhat | Jammu & Kashmir National Conference |
| 1983 | Ghulam Rasool Bhat | Jammu & Kashmir National Conference |
| 1987 | Ghulam Mohi-Ud-Din Bhat | Jammu & Kashmir National Conference |
| 1996 | Mohammed Maqbool | Jammu & Kashmir National Conference |
| 2002 | Ghulam Nabi Lone | Jammu and Kashmir People's Democratic Party |
| 2006 By-election | Shuib Nabi | Independent politician |
| 2008 | Syed Basharat Ahmad | Jammu and Kashmir People's Democratic Party |
| 2014 | Syed Basharat Ahmed Bukhari | Jammu and Kashmir People's Democratic Party |

== Election results ==
=== Assembly Election 2014 ===
2014 Jammu and Kashmir Legislative Assembly election : Sangrama
| Party | Candidate | Votes | % | ±% |
|---|---|---|---|---|
| JKPDP | Syed Basharat Ahmed Bukhari | 12,146 | 31.37% | ▲3.28 |
| INC | Shuib Nabi Lone | 10,392 | 26.84% | ▲21.22 |
| JKNC | Khwaja Mohammad Yaqoob Wani | 6,696 | 17.29% | ▲3.05 |
| Independent | Irfan Hafiz Lone | 3,829 | 9.89% | New |
| Independent | Fazal Mahmood Baig | 1,970 | 5.09% | New |
| JKPC | Ghulam Mohi-Ud-Din Bhat | 856 | 2.21% | New |
| JKNPP | Farooq Ahmad Bhat | 850 | 2.20% | New |
| NOTA | None of the Above | 456 | 1.18% | New |
| Margin of victory | | 1,754 | 4.53% | ▼0.25 |
| Turnout | | 38,722 | 58.53% | ▲11.92 |
| Registered electors | | 66,159 | | ▲10.90 |
| JKPDP hold | | Swing | ▲3.28 | |

=== Assembly Election 2008 ===
2008 Jammu and Kashmir Legislative Assembly election : Sangrama
| Party | Candidate | Votes | % | ±% |
|---|---|---|---|---|
| JKPDP | Syed Basharat Ahmad | 7,812 | 28.09% | ▼6.68 |
| Independent | Shoaib Nabi Lone | 6,482 | 23.31% | New |
| JKNC | Ghulam Qadir Bhat | 3,962 | 14.25% | New |
| Independent | Irfan Hafiz Lone | 2,441 | 8.78% | New |
| INC | Mohammed Muzaffar Parray | 1,563 | 5.62% | New |
| Independent | Mohammed Maqbool Dar | 1,032 | 3.71% | New |
| Jammu & Kashmir Democratic Party Nationalist | Sheikh Mushtaq Ahmad | 1,031 | 3.71% | New |
| Margin of victory | | 1,330 | 4.78% | ▼13.21 |
| Turnout | | 27,809 | 46.61% | ▼16.69 |
| Registered electors | | 59,659 | | ▲7.57 |
| JKPDP gain from Independent | | Swing | ▼24.67 | |

=== Assembly By-election 2006 ===
2006 Jammu and Kashmir Legislative Assembly by-election : Sangrama
| Party | Candidate | Votes | % | ±% |
|---|---|---|---|---|
| Independent | Shuib Nabi | 18,526 | 52.77% | New |
| JKPDP | Javid Hassan Beigh | 12,208 | 34.77% | ▼1.14 |
| Independent | Ghulam Mohi-Ud-Din Bhat | 2,322 | 6.61% | New |
| Independent | Zaffarullah Beigh | 1,041 | 2.96% | New |
| NKNPP | Sonaullah Baig | 379 | 1.08% | New |
| Independent | Javid Ahmad Qurashi | 324 | 0.92% | New |
| Independent | Abdul Rehman Lone | 310 | 0.88% | New |
| Margin of victory | | 6,318 | 17.99% | ▲7.71 |
| Turnout | | 35,110 | 63.31% | ▲41.20 |
| Registered electors | | 55,461 | | ▲19.10 |
| Independent gain from JKPDP | | Swing | ▲16.85 | |

=== Assembly Election 2002 ===
2002 Jammu and Kashmir Legislative Assembly election : Sangrama
| Party | Candidate | Votes | % | ±% |
|---|---|---|---|---|
| JKPDP | Ghulam Nabi Lone | 3,697 | 35.91% | New |
| JKNC | Mohammed Yousuf | 2,638 | 25.63% | ▼23.23 |
| INC | Mohammed Muzafar Parray | 2,022 | 19.64% | ▼6.14 |
| Independent | Abdul Ahad Malla | 801 | 7.78% | New |
| JD(U) | Ghulam Mohammad Shah | 568 | 5.52% | New |
| Independent | Azad Hussain Naik | 345 | 3.35% | New |
| Independent | Mustafa Ahmad Bhat | 223 | 2.17% | New |
| Margin of victory | | 1,059 | 10.29% | ▼12.79 |
| Turnout | | 10,294 | 22.11% | ▼33.12 |
| Registered electors | | 46,566 | | ▲28.48 |
| JKPDP gain from JKNC | | Swing | ▼12.94 | |

=== Assembly Election 1996 ===
1996 Jammu and Kashmir Legislative Assembly election : Sangrama
| Party | Candidate | Votes | % | ±% |
|---|---|---|---|---|
| JKNC | Mohammed Maqbool | 9,779 | 48.86% | ▲7.61 |
| INC | Shiekh Mohammed Sadiq | 5,160 | 25.78% | New |
| JD | Ghulam Mohammed Shah | 3,311 | 16.54% | New |
| Independent | Wali Mohammed Wani | 1,765 | 8.82% | New |
| Margin of victory | | 4,619 | 23.08% | ▲8.56 |
| Turnout | | 20,015 | 60.21% | ▼15.73 |
| Registered electors | | 36,245 | | ▲0.94 |
| JKNC hold | | Swing | ▲7.61 | |

=== Assembly Election 1987 ===
1987 Jammu and Kashmir Legislative Assembly election : Sangrama
| Party | Candidate | Votes | % | ±% |
|---|---|---|---|---|
| JKNC | Ghulam Mohi-Ud-Din Bhat | 10,509 | 41.25% | ▼16.01 |
| Independent | Vakil Abdul Majid | 6,810 | 26.73% | New |
| JKNC | Ghulam Ahmed Dar | 6,340 | 24.89% | ▼32.37 |
| Independent | Ghulam Hassan Mir | 1,245 | 4.89% | New |
| Independent | Ghulam Ahmed Ganai | 400 | 1.57% | New |
| Independent | Mohmad Yaqoob | 173 | 0.68% | New |
| Margin of victory | | 3,699 | 14.52% | ▼25.21 |
| Turnout | | 25,477 | 74.50% | ▼2.44 |
| Registered electors | | 35,908 | | ▲14.89 |
| JKNC hold | | Swing | ▼16.01 | |

=== Assembly Election 1983 ===
1983 Jammu and Kashmir Legislative Assembly election : Sangrama
| Party | Candidate | Votes | % | ±% |
|---|---|---|---|---|
| JKNC | Ghulam Rasool Bhat | 13,133 | 57.26% | ▼13.44 |
| INC | Mohammed Maqbool Malik | 4,020 | 17.53% | ▲7.03 |
| JKNC | Ghulam Ahmad Gulzar | 3,415 | 14.89% | ▼55.80 |
| JI | Abdul Rashid | 1,512 | 6.59% | ▼1.28 |
| Independent | Ghulam Hassan | 318 | 1.39% | New |
| Independent | Ghulam Ahmed Ganai | 289 | 1.26% | New |
| Independent | Abdul Aziz | 250 | 1.09% | New |
| Margin of victory | | 9,113 | 39.73% | ▼20.02 |
| Turnout | | 22,937 | 78.15% | ▲2.77 |
| Registered electors | | 31,255 | | ▲14.65 |
| JKNC hold | | Swing | ▼13.44 | |

=== Assembly Election 1977 ===
1977 Jammu and Kashmir Legislative Assembly election : Sangrama
| Party | Candidate | Votes | % | ±% |
|---|---|---|---|---|
| JKNC | Ghulam Rasool Bhat | 13,609 | 70.69% | New |
| JP | Sharif Ud Din | 2,106 | 10.94% | New |
| INC | Ghulam Hassan Ganai | 2,020 | 10.49% | New |
| JI | Abdul Majid Sofi | 1,516 | 7.87% | New |
| Margin of victory | | 11,503 | 59.75% | |
| Turnout | | 19,251 | 73.88% | |
| Registered electors | | 27,262 | | |
| JKNC win (new seat) | | | | |

== See also ==
- Sangrama
