= Kathal Hil Patribal =

- village
- Location within Jammu and Kashmir
- Coordinates: 34.17895210612133°N 74.07442433891619°E
- Country: India
- Union Territories: Jammu and Kashmir
- District: Baramulla
- Tehsil: Boniyar Tehsil

Population (2011)
  - Total: 1,283
- Time zone: UTC+2 (IST)

Kathal Hil Patribal is a village in Boniyar Tehsil in the Baramulla district of Jammu and Kashmir, India. It is located close to the town of Uri.

== Demographics ==
As of the 2011 Census of India, the population of the village is 1,283 with 660 males and 623 females. Children who are from 0–6 years old made up 17.61%, of the population. Literacy rate was 57.52% with male literacy rate at 74.73% and female literacy rate at 38.86%.
