= Fatehgadh, Baramulla =

Coordinates: 34°10′26″N 74°19′19″E

Fatehgadh (locally known as Fatehgarh) is a village located in Narvaw Baramulla tehsil of Baramulla district, Jammu and Kashmir, India.

Fatehgadh village has 2537 population of which 1302 are males and 1235 are females according to India Census 2011. The PIN code of Fatehgadh village is 193101.
