= Kitchama =

Village in Jammu and Kashmir, India

Kitchama or Ketshoam (Kashmiri pronunciation: [kɨt͡s hoːm] ) is a village located in Baramulla district of Jammu and Kashmir union territory of India. The village has two adjoining areas namely "Sheeri" and "Gantamulla" It is located 0 km towards west from District headquarters Baramulla. 52 km from State capital Srinagar Kashmir its also famous for Fraddy and Ishfaq Parray.
