= Dilna =

Village in India

Coordinates: 28°52′N 77°40′E

Delina is a village located in Baramulla town of Baramulla district, Jammu and Kashmir with total population of 7599 of which 3835 are males while 3764 are females as per Census 2011.
