= Chaklu =

Village in India

Coordinates: 34.2004°N 74.3968°E

Chaklu is a large village in Baramulla district, Jammu and Kashmir, India. Chaklu village has total population of 3366 of which 1722 are males while 1644 are females.
