= Zogiyar =

Zogiyar or Zooigyar is a village in the district of Baramulla in the union territory of Jammu and Kashmir, India.

== Geography ==
Zogiyar is situated in the middle of Narwaw surrounded by villages Sheeri, Fatehgarh, Badmulla, and Zandfaran. On the north side Zogiyar is 1 km from the river Jehlem and on the south side is the mountain of Pir Panjal Range. Zogiyar is approximately 8 km from the town of Baramulla.

There are three mohalas in Zogiyar: Bonpora, Manzpora and Shalteing. There are three Masjid Sharifs in Zogiyar one in each Mohala. One of the Masjids is Jamia Masjid Gosia Alihi Rehma situated in Bonpora.

The native language of Zogiyar is Kashmiri, however there are lot of speakers of Urdu and English language as well.

In Zogiyar there is an educational institution Govt Middle School, the shrine of Syed Qamar u Din Sahib Alihi Rehma and the charity organization Moosa Baitul Maal Zogiyar.
