= Auqib Nabi =

Indian cricketer (born 1996)

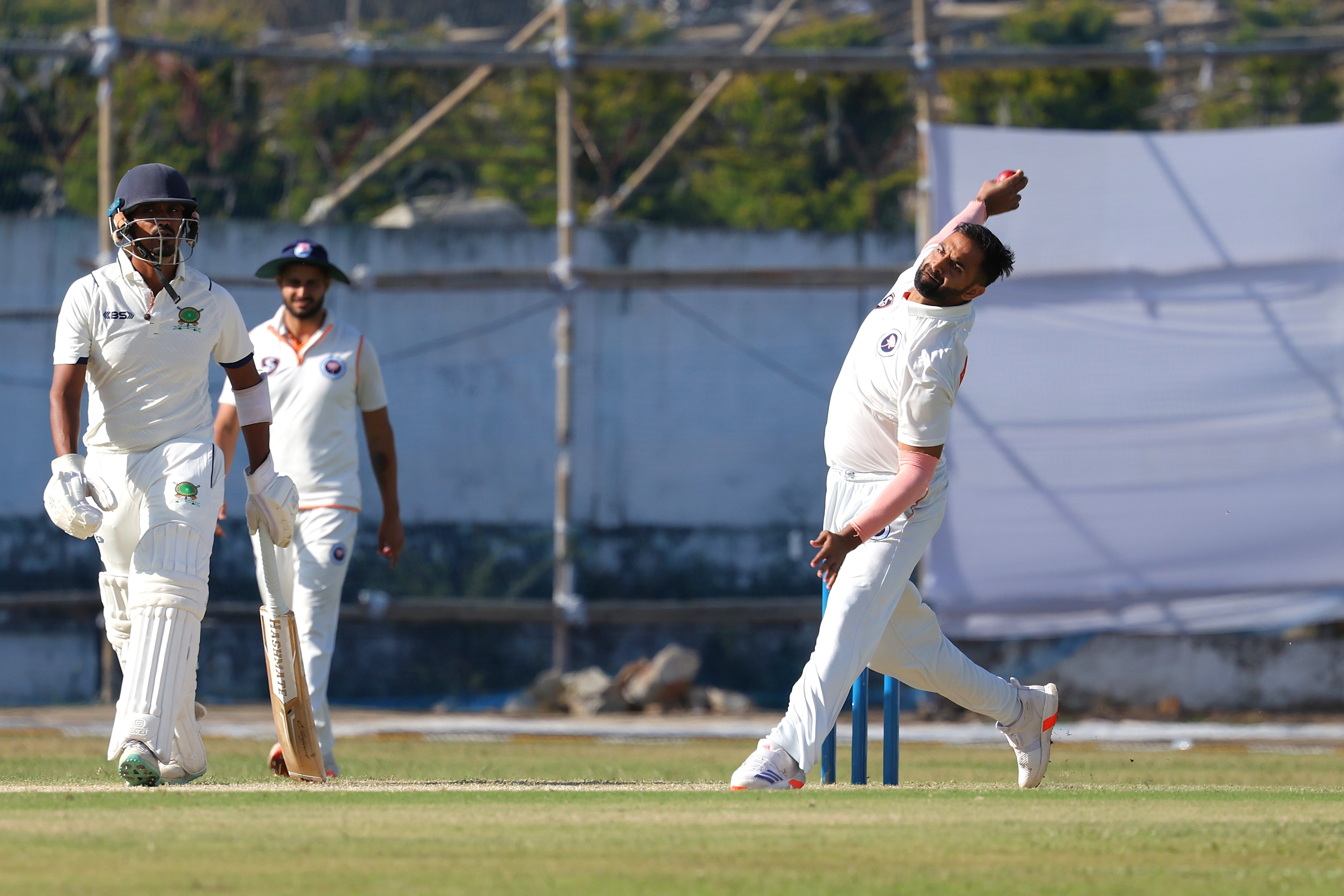
- Auqib bowling in the 2024–25 Ranji Trophy

Personal information
- Full name: Auqib Nabi Dar
- Born: 4 November 1996 (age 30); Sheeri, Jammu & Kashmir, India
- Height: 1.83 m (6 ft 0 in)
- Batting: Right-handed
- Bowling: Right-arm medium
- Role: Bowler

International information
- National side: India (2026–present)
- Only ODI (cap 265): 30 September 2026 v West Indies
- ODI shirt no.: 13

Domestic team information
- Years: Team
- 2018–present: Jammu & Kashmir
- 2026: Delhi Capitals
- 2026: Surrey

Career statistics
Competition	ODI	FC	LA	T20
Matches	6	47	42	39
Runs scored	11	1,093	583	155
Batting average	5.50	18.21	25.34	11.07
100s/50s	0/0	0/2	1/0	0/0
Top score	5	55	114*	32
Balls bowled	239	7,030	2,006	805
Wickets	5	180	61	43
Bowling average	48.80	18.90	29.13	25.27
5 wickets in innings	0	16	0	0
10 wickets in match	0	4	0	0
Best bowling	2/31	7/24	4/39	4/16
Catches/stumpings	1/–	7/–	6/–	11/–
- Source: Cricinfo, 16 November 2026

Auqib Nabi Dar (born 4 November 1996) is an Indian cricketer who plays for the Indian national team as a right-arm medium bowler. He plays for Jammu & Kashmir in domestic cricket and Delhi Capitals in the Indian Premier League.

== Domestic career ==
Auqib made his List A debut for Jammu & Kashmir in the 2018–19 Vijay Hazare Trophy on 23 September 2018.

He made his Twenty20 debut on 11 November 2019, for Jammu & Kashmir in the 2019–20 Syed Mushtaq Ali Trophy.

He made his first-class debut on 3 January 2020, for Jammu & Kashmir in the 2019–20 Ranji Trophy. On 19 January 2020, he took 5 for 39 wickets against Odisha in a Ranji Trophy match.

In October 2024 he took his best first-class figures, 5 for 29, to help Jammu & Kashmir dismiss Services for 71.

In the 2024–25 Ranji season he took 44 wickets, the second-most in the season, with a strike-rate of 30.47 and an average of 13.93. He was selected for North Zone in the 2025–26 Duleep Trophy. In the game against East Zone he took four wickets in four balls starting with Virat Singh. He achieved his highest first-class score and best bowling figures in Jammu & Kashmir's innings defeat of Rajasthan in October 2025, when he made 55 and took 3 for 29 and 7 for 24. He won the player of the match award in the Ranji Trophy semi-final in February 2026 when he took 5 for 87 and 4 for 36 and made 42 in Jammu & Kashmir's victory over Bengal, which took them into their first-ever Ranji Trophy final. Jammu & Kashmir won the Ranji Trophy by winning the final on the first innings, and his 60 wickets at an average of 12.65 earned him the award of player of the tournament.

== Franchise Career ==
In December 2025, he was bought by Delhi Capitals for ₹8.40 crore (equivalent to ₹8.7 crore or US$930,000 in 2026) in the 2026 IPL auction.

== County Career ==
In September 2026, he joined Surrey for three County Championship Division One matches against Yorkshire, Sussex and Glamorgan.

== International career ==
On 3 August 2026, Auqib got his maiden international call up where he was selected in the Indian Test squad for the two-match series against Sri Lanka, replacing the injured Jasprit Bumrah, but did not play any match.

On 16 September 2026, he was selected in the Indian ODI squad for the three-match series against West Indies. He received his maiden ODI cap in the second match against West Indies on 30 September 2026.
