= Seer Jagir =

Village in Jammu and Kashmir, India

- Village
- Seer Jagir
- Location in Jammu and Kashmir Seer Jagir (India)
- Coordinates: 34.2701°N 74.4594°E
- Country: India
- Union Territory: Jammu and Kashmir
- District: Baramulla
- Tehsil: Sopore

Area
  - Total: 471.5 ha (1,165 acres)

Population
  - Total: 7,997

Languages
  - Official: Kashmiri, Urdu, Hindi, English
- Time zone: UTC+05:30 (IST)
- PIN: 193202
- Telephone Code: 01954
- Vehicle registration: JK-05
- Literacy: 56.81%
- Village Code: 002191
- Website: barammulla.nic.in

Seer Jagir is a census village in the Sopore tehsil of Baramulla district, Jammu & Kashmir, India. As per the 2011 Census of India, Seer Jagir has a total population of 7,997 people including 4,085 males and 3,912 female, and has a literacy rate of 56.81%.
