= Irfan Hafiz Lone =

Indian politician

Member of Jammu and Kashmir Legislative Assembly
- Incumbent
- Assumed office 8 October 2024
- Constituency: Wagoora-Kreeri

Personal details
- Party: Indian National Congress
- Profession: Politician

Irfan Hafiz Lone is an Indian politician from Jammu and Kashmir. He is a member of the Jammu and Kashmir Legislative Assembly from 2024, representing Wagoora–Kreeri Assembly constituency as a member of the Indian National Congress party.

== Electoral performance ==
Election	Constituency	Party	Result	Votes %	Opposition Candidate	Opposition Party	Opposition vote %	Ref
2024	Wagoora–Kreeri	INC	Won	38.17%	Syed Basharat Ahmed Bukhari	JKPDP	20.77%	

== See also ==
- 2024 Jammu and Kashmir Legislative Assembly election
- Jammu and Kashmir Legislative Assembly
