= Dangiwacha =

Town in Jammu and Kashmir, India

- Town
- Location in Jammu and Kashmir, India
- Coordinates: 34°22′N 74°15′E
- Country: India
- Union territory: Jammu and Kashmir
- District: Baramulla

Government
  - Type: Democratic
- Elevation: 1,577 m (5,174 ft)

Languages
  - Official: Kashmiri, Urdu, Hindi, Dogri, English
- Time zone: UTC+5:30 (IST)
- PIN: 193303
- Vehicle registration: JK05

Dangiwacha is a small town located in the Baramulla district of the Jammu and Kashmir, India. It serves as an important administrative and commercial hub for the surrounding rural areas and is part of the Rafiabad tehsil.

== Geography ==
Dangiwacha is situated in the northwestern part of Jammu and Kashmir, approximately 14 kilometres from the district headquarters of Baramulla and about 60 kilometres from Srinagar, the summer capital of Jammu and Kashmir.
