= Gantamulla =

Gantamulla or Gantemul is a village in Baramulla district in Jammu and Kashmir India. Gantamulla village is divided into two areas Gantamulla Payeen and Gantamulla Bala.
