= Tarazuea =

Village in Jammu and Kashmir, India

- Village
- Tarazuea
- Map of Jammu and Kashmir Tarazuea (India)
- Coordinates: 34.2511°N 74.5500°E
- Country: India
- Union Territory: Jammu and Kashmir
- District: Baramulla
- Tehsil: Sopore

Area
  - Total: 681.9 ha (1,685 acres)

Population
  - Total: 6,910

Languages
  - Official: Kashmiri, Urdu, Hindi, English
- Time zone: UTC+05:30 (IST)
- PIN: 193202
- Telephone Code: 01954
- Vehicle registration: JK-05
- Literacy: 53.01%
- Village Code: 193202
- Website: barammulla.nic.in

Tarazuea is a census village in the Sopore tehsil of Baramulla district, Jammu & Kashmir, India. As per the 2011 Census of India, Tarazuea has a total population of 6,910 people including 3,504 males and 3,406 with a literacy rate of 53.01%.
