= Baramulla Polytechnic College =

Coordinates: 34.2178°N 74.3995°E

The Government Polytechnic College, Baramulla, otherwise Baramulla Polytechnic College, is one of the Government polytechnics of the state of Jammu and Kashmir, India, which has been established in 2012 under Direct Central Assistance with the Prime Minister's special scheme aimed at producing a large number of trained technical personnel. The polytechnic is located in the Kanispora area of Baramulla in Jammu and Kashmir state. The polytechnic teaches three-year diploma courses in electrical engineering and architecture. Er. Syed Shabir A Rufai has been the pioneering Principal of the Polytechnic College. The first batch of the Polytechnic came out in the year 2015.
