= Kreeri =

Kreeri Kreer Murad Abad kreeri
- Town
- Nickname: Hazrat Kreeri
- Location in Jammu and Kashmir, India Kreeri (India)
- Coordinates: 34.17°N 74.47°E
- Country: India
- Union territory: Jammu and Kashmir
- District: Baramulla

Languages
  - Official: Kashmiri, Urdu English
- Time zone: UTC+5:30 (IST)
- PIN: 193198

Kreeri or Kreer is a tehsil in Pattan sub-district. It is medical block and falls under the jurisdiction of revenue Block Wagoora in Baramulla district in the Indian administered union territory of Jammu and Kashmir. It is the business centre with Wagoora of the Wagoora-Kreeri Legislative Assembly or Kruhin region of North Kashmir.

Kreeri has a recorded history of about 600 years when the Sufi saint, scholar, mystic, and authority on Islamic law Hazrat Mir Syed Haji Murad Bukhari (RA) made it his abode. His ancestors had come from central Asia and travelled to the valley from Multan. During his time Sultan Zain ul Abideen, Budshah visited Kreeri and offered Friday prayers under his leadership. His Khanqah and Ziyarat (Mazar) is revered by all Muslims of the valley.

== Amenities ==
Kreeri has a post office (with postal code 193108) and a regional water supply scheme that provides drinking water to about three dozen villages in the Sangrama and Pattan constituencies.

A sub-district hospital and a big market provides all types of amenities to the people of adjoining areas. It is a police sub division headed by an SDPO, a police station with 62 villages in its jurisdiction, besides a post office, a boys' degree college, a girls' high school besides sub division level offices of Horticulture, Animal Husbandry, Irrigation and Water supply departments. The famous schools include Govt. Higher Secondary School, Hanfia Model Higher Secondary School, Green Land English Medium School, Hanfia Mission High School etc.

Kreeri is also famous for its apple orchards throughout Kashmir. The famous brand of Kashmiri apple 'Ambri' is also found in the locality. The town is also famous for the fresh water springs that are found in a nearby village Hail. The water is fresh and sweet in taste. The famous brand out of these springs is the "Khudchetar Naag', 'Pathnaar Naag and Nagraad". Kreeri has produced famous poets, and writers in the distant past. Even in the present times Kreeri is home to many academics, intellectuals, scholars and writers who are acknowledged not only in India but also abroad.
