= Watergam =

- Town
- Location in Jammu and Kashmir Watergam (India)
- Coordinates: 34.31°N 74.37°E
- Country: India
- Union Territory: Jammu and Kashmir
- District: Baramulla
- Elevation: 1,599.895 m (5,249.00 ft)
- Demonym(s): Watergami, Watergamian

Languages
  - Official: Kashmiri, Urdu, Hindi, Dogri, English
- Time zone: UTC+5:30 (IST)
- PIN: 193303
- Telephone code: 01954

Watergam Rafiabad is a town located in Baramulla district in the Indian union territory of Jammu and Kashmir. It is 58 km (36 mi) north-west of Srinagar, and 15 km (9 mi) from the city of Baramulla. It is located on the banks of Nallah Hamal running parallel to the Baramulla-Rafiabad-Kupwara National Highway NH-701.

== History ==
Syed Kirman chose Watergam as the center of his mission, and he is buried here on the hilltop. Giving due credit to its centrality and rich history, J&K Govt. gave Watergam a Tehsil Status which caters to the needs of about 22 villages.

== Geography ==
Watergam town is called the "Heart of Rafiabad" constituency. It is equidistant to the three nearby towns, Baramulla 15 km (9.3 mi), Sopore 11 km (6.8 mi) and Handwara 13 km (8.1 mi). It has a well-established market in Rafiabad. It has a municipal committee to look into different needs of the town. The municipal limits of Watergam extend from Gundkarim Khan in the west up to Behrampora in the east, Rehmatabad (Thagund), Gundmulraj and Chanapora are also part of the Municipal limits.

== Demographics ==
The Watergam city is divided into 13 wards for which elections are held every 5 years. The Watergam Municipal Committee has a population of 7,015 of which 3,939 are males while 3,076 are females as per report released by Census India 2011.

The population of children with the age of 0–6 is 727 which is 10.36% of the total population of Watergam (MC). In Watergam Municipal Committee, the female sex ratio is 781 against state average of 889. Moreover, the child sex ratio in Watergam is around 1095 compared to Jammu and Kashmir state average of 862. The literacy rate of Watergam city is 74.60% higher than the state average of 67.16%. In Watergam, male literacy is around 86.08% while the female literacy rate is 59.31%.

Watergam Municipal Committee has total administration over 932 houses to which it supplies basic amenities like water and sewerage. It is also authorized to build roads within Municipal Committee limits and impose taxes on properties coming under its jurisdiction.
