= Boniyar tehsil =

Boniyar
- Tehsil
- Country: India
- Union Territory: Jammu and Kashmir
- District: Baramulla

Population
  - Estimate (2011): 72,564
- Time zone: UTC+5:30 (IST)

Boniyar is a tehsil located in Baramulla district, Jammu and Kashmir, India. The town of Boniyar is the administrative center. There are 51 villages that are part of the tehsil including Kathal Hil Patribal.

== Villages ==
1. Athishampora
2. Azad Pora
3. Bacchi
4. Badain
5. Bagna
6. Banali
7. Batangi
8. Bela Slamabad
9. Bernate
10. Bijhama
11. Bimyar
12. Boniyar
13. BrariPora
14. Challa
15. Chootali
16. Dara Kujan
17. Dudran
18. Gager Hill
19. Gird Nawah
20. Hiller Pernia
21. Ijara
22. Jabdi
23. Javind
24. Kanchan
25. Kathal Hil Pathri
26. Lari
27. Limber
28. Lachipora
29. Maidanan
30. Manzgam
31. Mayan
32. Mohra
33. Muqam Peran
34. Nagnari
35. Niloosa
36. Noorkhah
37. Nowgran
38. Nowshara
39. Peernia
40. Pehlipora
41. Prankutran
42. Pringle
43. Rampora
44. Salamabad Dachhna
45. Salasan
46. Shaladajan
47. Sheer Wanipora
48. Trikanjan
49. Uranbowa
50. Warikhah
51. Zehem Pora
