= Wagoora =

Wagoora Wogur
- Town/ Tehsil
- Location in Jammu and Kashmir, India Wagoora (India)
- Coordinates: 34.17°N 74.42°E
- Country: India
- Union Territory: Jammu and Kashmir
- District: Baramulla

Population (2011)
  - Total: 15,432

Languages
  - Official: Kashmiri, Urdu, Hindi, Dogri, English
- Time zone: UTC+5:30 (IST)
- PIN: 193109
- Vehicle registration: JK-05

Wagoora or Wogur is a tehsil and a small town in Baramulla district of Jammu and Kashmir, India.

== History ==
The earliest traces of human settlements in Wagoora are historically noted as dating back to the 3rd millennium BC, making it one of the ancient habitation sites in the Baramulla district. The town has a rich cultural legacy and is recognized as a birthplace for various poets and scholars. Administratively, Wagoora's significance grew when it was officially granted Tehsil status in 2014 by the Government of Jammu and Kashmir, serving as a central hub for the surrounding villages.

== Geography ==
Wagoora is situated approximately 20 km from Baramulla and 13 km from Sopore. It is located on the banks of the Ningli Nallah, a vital tributary that originates from the Apharwat heights in Gulmarg. This stream is a critical resource for the agricultural and horticultural lands of the Wagoora block. The town is surrounded by fertile apple orchards, which form the backbone of the local economy.

== Demographics ==
According to the official Census of India 2011, the Wagoora block encompasses a diverse population. The town's literacy rate is approximately 71%, which is notably higher than the overall average for the Baramulla district (64.63%). Kashmiri is the primary language spoken in the region, while Urdu and English are used for administrative and educational purposes.

== Education ==
Wagoora serves as a major educational center for the northern region of Baramulla.

=== Higher Education ===
- Government Degree College (Women): The J&K Higher Education Department has sanctioned a Women's Degree College for the area. Land for the permanent campus has been identified at Wagila village in the outskirts of Wagoora.

=== Government Sector Schools ===
- Govt Boys Higher Secondary School (BHSS) Wagoora
- Govt Girls High School Wagoora
- Kasturba Gandhi Balika Vidyalaya (KGBV) Wagoora: A residential school for underprivileged girls.
- Govt Middle School (Block Colony) Wagoora
- Govt Primary School (Pethgam) Wagoora

=== Private Sector Schools ===
- Kirmani Memorial Institute: One of the leading private institutions in the zone.
- Hanfia Model School Wagoora
- People's Public School Wagoora
- Rainbow Public School Wagoora
- Safa Islamia Public School Wagoora
