= Boniyar =

Boniyar Buniyar
- Tehsil
- Location in Jammu and Kashmir, India Boniyar (India)
- Coordinates: 34°08′11″N 74°10′43″E
- Country: India
- Union territory: Jammu and Kashmir
- District: Baramulla

Area
  - Total: 96 km^{2} (37 sq mi)
- Elevation: 1,577 m (5,174 ft)

Population (2011)
  - Total: 72,564
  - Density: 760/km^{2} (2,000/sq mi)

Languages
  - Official: Kashmiri, Urdu, Hindi, Dogri, English
  - Spoken: Pahari, Gojri
- Time zone: UTC+5:30 (IST)
- PIN: 193122
- Vehicle registration: JK05
- Website: baramulla.nic.in

Boniyar (Urdu: بونیار kashmir: بونِیار) is a town and a municipal committee in Boniyar tehsil, Baramulla district in India's northernmost union territory of Jammu and Kashmir. It is located 20 km (12 mi) west of the district headquarters Baramulla. Boniyar was given tehsil status in 2006. Prominent villages in tehsil Boniyar are Noorkhah, Bagna, Salamabad, Wopal Haq Marg, Athishampora, Bijhama, Trikanjan, Barnate, Uranbuha, Chandanwari, Rampur, Chahla and Nowshera. A major tourist attraction is Lower Jhelum hydropower project at Chalah Boniyar, having a capacity of generating 105 MW. Lachipora wildlife sanctuary has been established for conserving markhoor and other vulnerable animals. Wildlife sanctuary Limber and Kazinag wildlife sanctuary are also a part of tehsil Boniyar. These wildlife sanctuaries are famous for rare species of plants and animals present here.

The bank of the dam of Lower Jehlum Hydropower plant has become a tourist destination.

There is a diversity of people living in Boniyar tehsil, with most of the people speaking Pahari. About 50–70 % people of tehsil Boniyar speak Pahari, with a large number of Pahari speakers. The remainder mainly speak Kashmiri, Gujri and Urdu. It is a Muslim-dominated region with about 60% belonging to the Sunni Muslim community and 38% to the Shia Muslim community. Other religions comprise the minority, with about 1% Hindus and 1% Sikhs.

Noorkhah, a village of Boniyar tehsil, has significant mineral resources such as gypsum, limestone and ochre, with gypsum currently being extracted. However, this has also led to ill effects to the residents such as deforestation, soil erosion and landslides.
