= Rohama =

Rohama Rohoam Shitlu
- Town
- Location in Jammu and Kashmir, India
- Coordinates: 34.2372166°N 74.3423016°E
- Country: India
- State: Jammu and Kashmir
- District: Baramulla

Area
  - Total: 10 km^{2} (3.9 sq mi)
  - Rank: 1st

Population (2011)
  - Total: 8,756
  - Density: 880/km^{2} (2,300/sq mi)

Languages
  - Official: Kashmiri, Urdu, Hindi, Dogri, English
- Time zone: UTC+5:30 (IST)
- PIN: 193301
- Literacy: 67.20%

Rohama or Rohoam is one of the largest villages in the Baramulla district of Jammu and Kashmir, India. This village is situated 12 km from district headquarter 'It shares its boundaries with 21 villages' there are more than 40 government and semi-government offices, it got tehsil status in 2005 and consists of many sub district offices.

== Population ==
According to 2001 Census of India, the Rohama town has a total population of 8756 which divides into 1256 householders. The overall literacy rate is 67.20% against the total literacy rate 67.16% of the J&K state.
