= Uri, Jammu and Kashmir =

Uri
- Town
- Location in Jammu and Kashmir, India Uri (India)
- Coordinates: 34°5′10″N 74°2′0″E
- Country: India
- Union territory: Jammu and Kashmir
- District: Baramulla

Government
  - Type: Tehsil

Population (2011)
  - Total: 9,366

Languages
  - Official: Gujari, Pahari, Kashmiri, Urdu, Hindi, Dogri, English
- Time zone: UTC+5:30 (IST)
- PIN: 193123
- Telephone code: 01956
- Vehicle registration: JK 05
- Sex ratio: 1.13
- Literacy: 83%
- Website: www.baramulla.nic.in

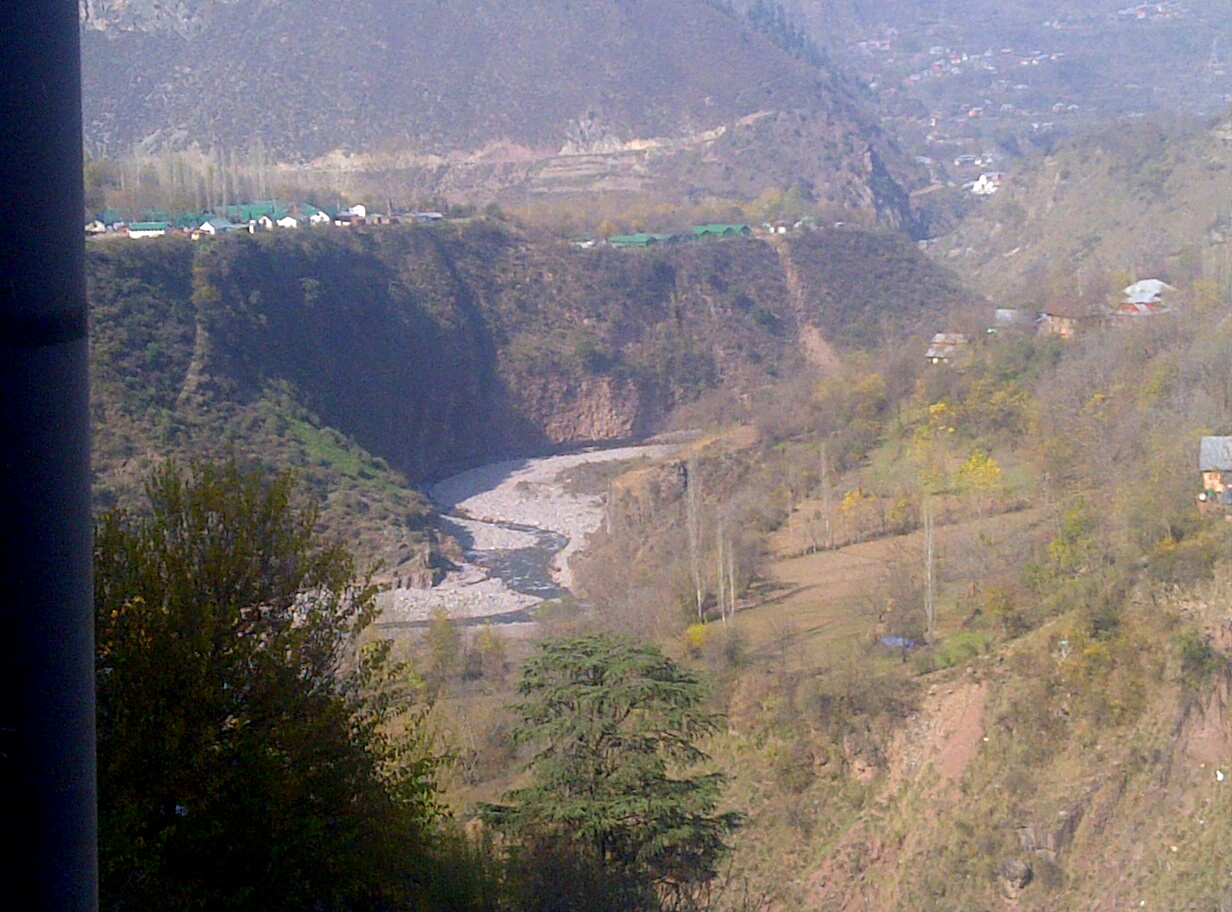
Jhelum River in Uri

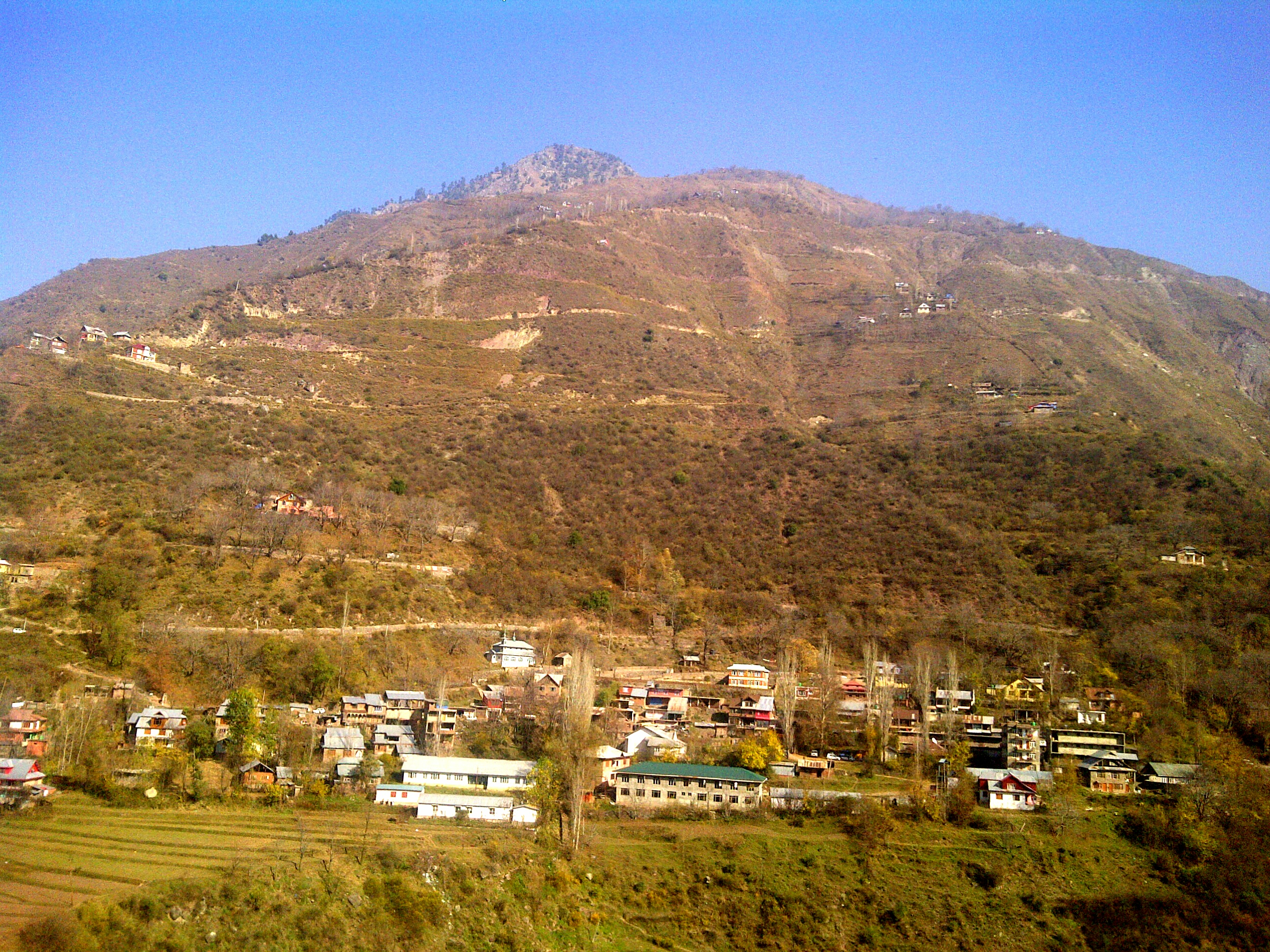
Old market of Uri

Uri (Kashmiri pronunciation: [uː.ɽiː]) is a town and a tehsil in the Baramulla district, in the Indian union territory of Jammu and Kashmir. Uri is located on the left bank of the Jhelum River, about 10 kilometres (6.2 mi) east of the Line of Control with Pakistan.

== Location ==
Uri is located at the entrance to the Kashmir Valley from the west, lying on the Jhelum Valley Road. Prior to the partition of Kashmir, the road linked Uri to Rawalpindi and Srinagar. Another important road linked Uri to Poonch via the Haji Pir pass. Uri is at a distance of 76 miles (122 km) from Srinagar, 42 miles (68 km) from Muzaffarabad and 49 miles (79 km) from Poonch.

== History ==
Hari Singh Nalwa (r. 1820–1823), the Sikh commander-administrator of Maharaja Ranjit Singh, built the fort of Uri.

Following the First Anglo-Sikh War (1845–1846) and the Treaty of Amritsar (1846), Raja Gulab Singh was proclaimed the Maharaja of Jammu and Kashmir, acquiring all the lands between the Ravi River and the Indus. Uri became a tehsil in the Muzaffarabad district of the Kashmir province.

On 22 October 1947, the tribal invasion led to the fall of Muzaffarabad and Uri to the Pashtun tribes from Pakistan. The raiders then halted at Baramulla. Following the accession of the Maharaja to India on 26 October, India air lifted troops to the Kashmir Valley, who retook Baramulla and Uri by mid-November. The Indian government attached utmost importance to the defence of Uri. Muzaffarabad, on the other hand, came under Pakistani control and became the capital of Azad Kashmir. The tehsil of Uri was subsequently merged into the Baramulla district. In July, 2022 the SIA conducted raids on Uri because it was under militant control.

=== 2016 Uri attack ===
At around 5:30 a.m. on 18 September 2016, four Jaish-e-Mohammed terrorists attacked an Indian Army Brigade headquarters at Uri near the Line of Control. They are said to have lobbed 17 grenades in 3 minutes. A rear administrative base camp with tents caught fire and 17 army personnel were killed. A six-hour gun battle ensued, during which all four terrorists were killed. An additional 19-30 soldiers were reportedly injured in the attack.

== Demographics ==
Religion in Uri Town (2011)
1. Islam (50.2%)
2. Hinduism (39.5%)
3. Sikhism (9.34%)
4. Christianity (0.67%)
5. Not Stated (0.27%)
6. Buddhism (0.00%)
7. Jainism (0.01%)

As of 2011, the town of Uri has a population of 9,366 of which 6,674 (71%) are males and 2,692 (29%) are females according to the report published by Census India in 2011. Uri has an average literacy rate of 88.46%, higher than the national average of 76%. Male literacy is 95.27%, and female literacy is 70.02%. Child sex ratio is approximately 851 as compared to the state average of 862 and the population of children under 6 years of age is 879 which is 9.39% of the total population.

=== Religion ===
As of 2011, Islam is followed by 50.21% the population of Uri.

== Languages ==
Languages of Uri
1. Pahari (37.9%)
2. Kashmiri (32.1%)
3. Hindko (15.1%)
4. Gojri (9.40%)
5. Other languages including Urdu (5.50%)

== Bibliography ==
- Dasgupta, C. (2014) [first published 2002], War and Diplomacy in Kashmir, 1947-48, SAGE Publications, ISBN 978-81-321-1795-7
- Raghavan, Srinath (2010), War and Peace in Modern India: A Strategic History of the Nehru Years, Palgrave Macmillan, ISBN 978-1-137-00737-7
- Snedden, Christopher (2013) [first published as The Untold Story of the People of Azad Kashmir, 2012], Kashmir: The Unwritten History, HarperCollins India, ISBN 978-9350298985
