= Kashmir division =

Administrative division in Indian Union Territory of Jammu and Kashmir

- Region administered by India as an Administrative division
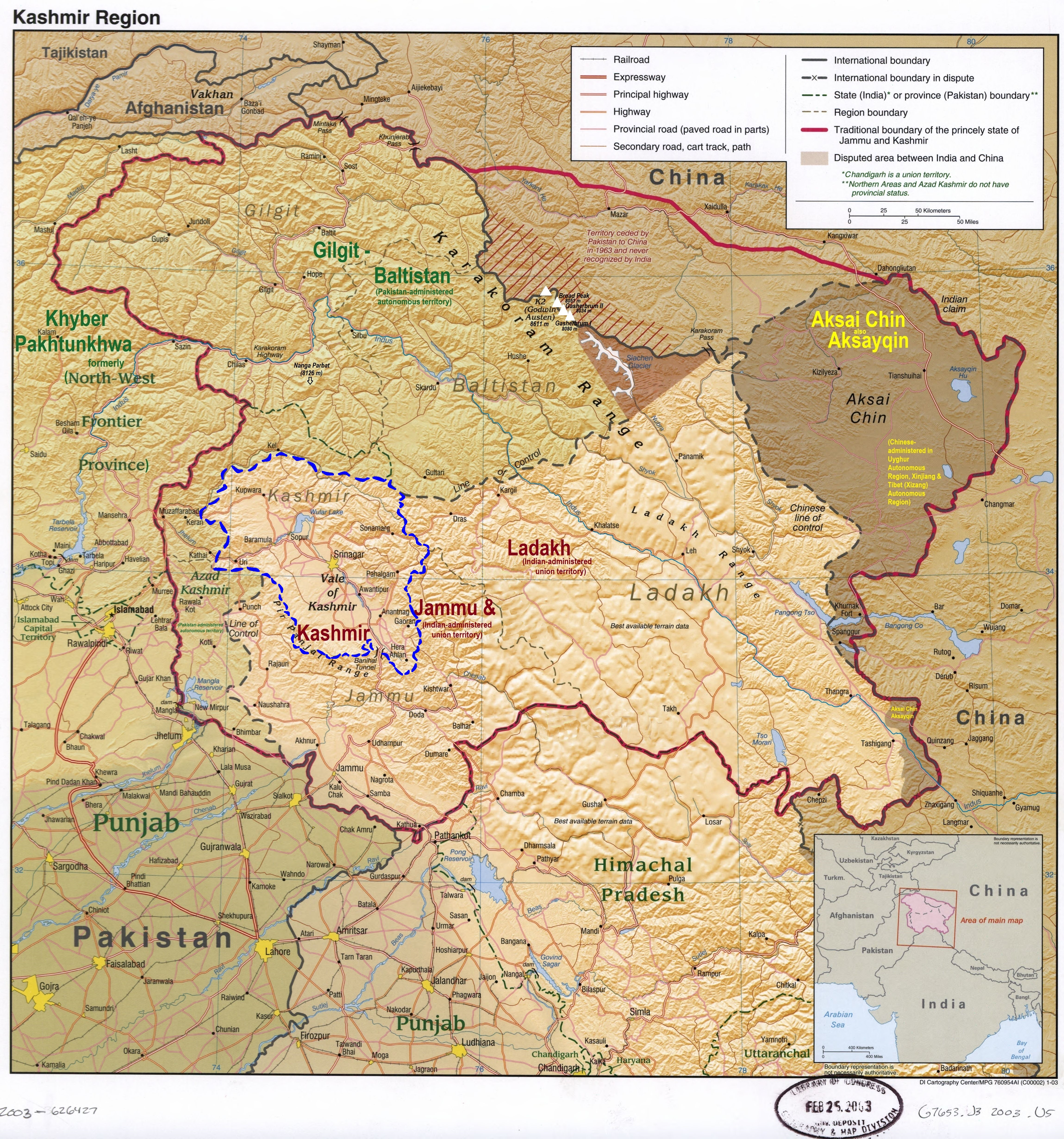
- A map of the Kashmir division (neon blue) of the Indian-administered Jammu and Kashmir (shaded tan) in the disputed Kashmir region.
- Interactive map of Kashmir division
- Coordinates: 34°14′N 74°40′E
- Administering country: India
- Union territory: Jammu and Kashmir
- Districts: Anantnag, Baramulla, Budgam, Bandipore, Ganderbal, Kupwara, Kulgam, Pulwama, Shopian and Srinagar
- Capital: Srinagar
- Regions & Historical divisions: List: Kamraz (North Kashmir); Yamraz (Central Kashmir); Maraz (South Kashmir)

Government
  - Type: Division
  - Divisional Commissioner: Anshul Garg

Area
  - Total: 15,948 km^{2} (6,158 sq mi)

Dimensions
  - Length: 135 km (84 mi)
  - Width: 32 km (20 mi)
- Elevation: 1,620 m (5,310 ft)

Population (2011)
  - Total: 6,888,475
  - Density: 431.93/km^{2} (1,118.7/sq mi)
- Demonym(s): Kashmiris, Koshur

Ethnicity and language
  - Languages: Kashmiri, Gujari, Pahari, Urdu, Hindi, English, Shina
  - Ethnic groups: Kashmiri, Gujjar, Pahari, Shina
  - Religion (2011): 96.41% Islam, 2.45% Hinduism, 0.81% Sikhism, 0.17% Christianity, 0.16% Others
- Time zone: UTC+5:30 (IST)
- Vehicle registration: JK
- Highest peak: Machoi Peak (5458 metres)
- Largest lake: Wular lake (260 km^{2} (100 sq mi))
- Longest river: Jhelum River (725 kilometres)
- Website: http://kashmirdivision.nic.in/

The Kashmir division is a revenue and administrative division of the Indian-administered Jammu and Kashmir in the disputed Kashmir region. It comprises the Kashmir Valley, bordering the Jammu Division to the south and Ladakh to the east. The Line of Control forms its boundary with the Pakistani-administered territories of Gilgit−Baltistan and Azad Jammu and Kashmir to the north and west and west, respectively.

Its main city is Srinagar. Other important cities include Anantnag, Baramulla, Sopore, Bandipora, Sumbal and Kulgam.

== Districts ==
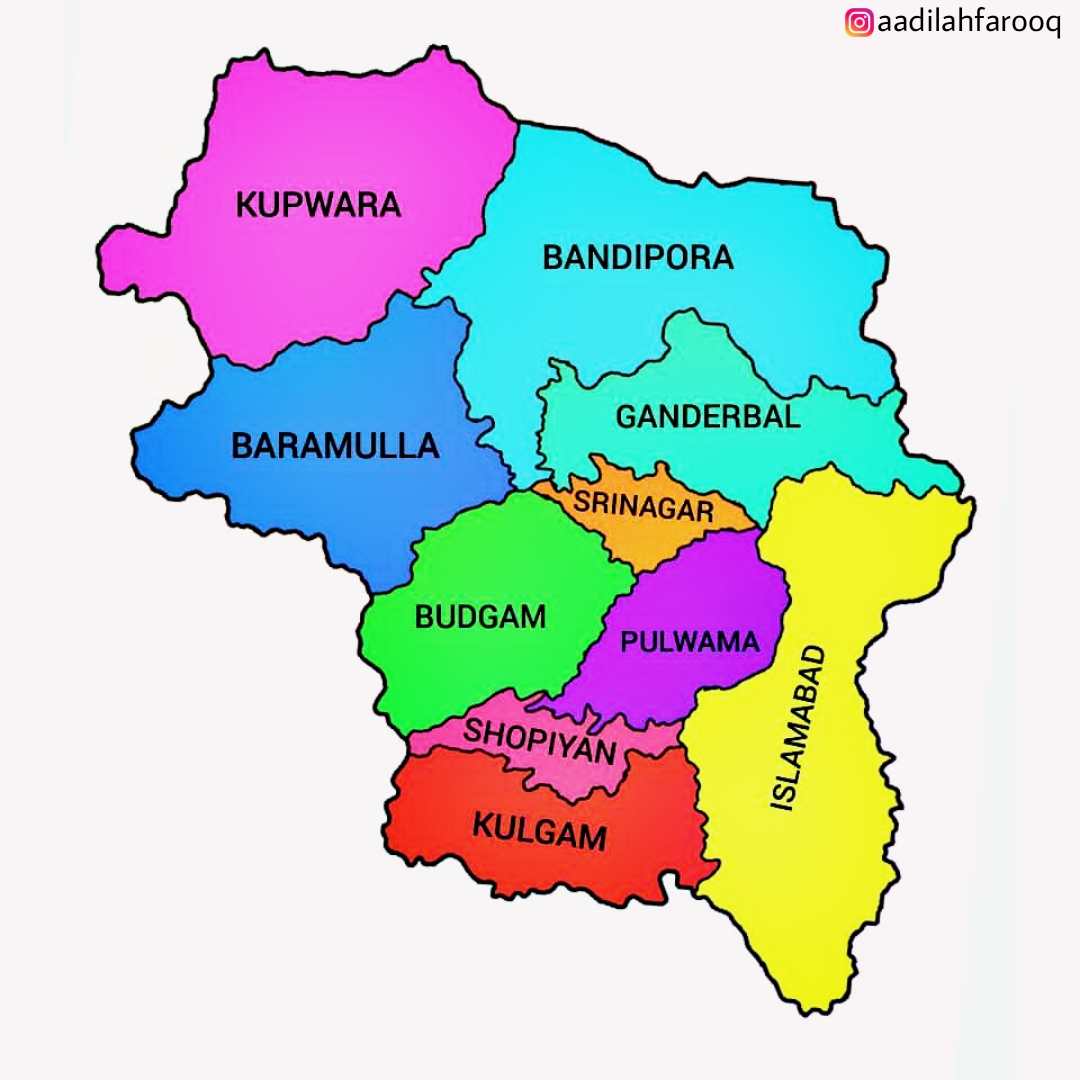
District map of Kashmir

The Indian administrative districts for the Kashmir Valley were reorganised in 1968, and 2006, each time subdividing existing districts. Kashmir Division currently consists of the following ten districts:

Name of district	HQ	Area				Population	
Name of district	HQ	Total (km^{2})	Total (sq mile)	Rural (km^{2})	Urban (km^{2})	2001 census	2011 census
Anantnag	Anantnag	3,574	1,380	3,475.8	98.2	778,408	1,078,692
Kulgam	Kulgam	410	158	360.2	49.8	394,026	424,483
Pulwama	Pulwama	1,086	419	1,047.5	38.6	441,275	560,440
Shopian	Shopian	312	120	306.6	5.4	211,332	266,215
Budgam	Budgam	1,361	525	1,312.0	49.1	607,181	753,745
Srinagar	Srinagar	1,979	764	1,684.4	294.5	1,027,670	1,236,829
Ganderbal	Ganderbal	259	100	233.6	25.4	217,907	297,446
Bandipore	Bandipore	345	133	295.4	49.6	304,886	392,232
Baramulla	Baramulla	4,243	1,638	4,179.4	63.6	843,892	1,008,039
Kupwara	Kupwara	2,379	919	2,331.7	47.3	650,393	870,354
Total		15,948	6,158	15,226.4	721.5	5,476,970	6,888,475

== Demographics ==
=== Religion ===
Religions in Kashmir Division (2011)
1. Islam 97.16 (95.4%)
2. Hinduism 2.45 (2.41%)
3. Sikhism 0.81 (0.80%)
4. Christianity 0.17 (0.17%)
5. 0.16 (0.16%)
6. 0 (0.00%)
7. Others 0.9 (0.88%)
8. Not Stated 0.2 (0.20%)

The Kashmir division is largely Muslim (97.16%) with a very small Hindu (2.45%) and Sikh (0.81%) population. The Kashmiri Muslim population consists of both Shias and Sunnis. The majority of the Muslim population is made up of ethnic Kashmiris, with a significant minority of Pahari-Pothwari and Gujjar-Bakarwal people mainly living at the border area adjoining Pakistani administered Kashmir. The valley had a small but visible minority of Kashmiri Hindus prior to the exodus of Kashmiri Hindus in the 1990s. It is estimated that during the peak of the insurgency, 60,000 - 100,000 were forced to leave the valley.

=== Language ===
Kashmir division: mother-tongue of population, according to the 2011 Census.
1. Kashmiri (85.3%)
2. Gojri (6.27%)
3. Pahari-Pothwari (4.18%)
4. Hindi (1.26%)
5. Others (3.01%)

The majority of the population speaks Kashmiri (85.28%), while the remainder speaks either Gujari, Pahari-Pothwari or Hindi.

Urdu is also widely understood as a literary language in Kashmir due to it being a medium of instruction in schools.
