= Sangrama =

Khmer Empire general

Sangrama was the general of King Udayadityavarman II of the Khmer Empire in what is now Cambodia. According to stele at Baphuon, he put down a revolt by Aravindahrada in 1051, who then fled to Champa. Two additional revolts in 1065, by Kamvau and then by the brothers Slvat and Siddhikara with Sasantibhuvana, were put down by Sangrama, but not before he was wounded in the jaw.
