= Syed Basharat Ahmed Bukhari =

Former Law Minister of Jammu and Kashmir

Member of the Jammu and Kashmir Legislative Council
- In office 11 April 2004 – 31 December 2008
- Constituency: Sangrama (District Baramulla)

Member of the Jammu and Kashmir Legislative Assembly
- In office 2009–2018
- Preceded by: Shoaib Nabi Lone
- Succeeded by: Constituency abolished
- Constituency: Sangrama

Minister for Law, Justice, Parliamentary affairs, Relief and Rehabilitation in Government of Jammu and Kashmir
- In office 1 March 2015 – 7 January 2016

Minister for Revenue, Relief and Rehabilitation in Government of Jammu and Kashmir
- In office 5 April 2016 – 17 February 2017

Minister for Horticulture in Government of Jammu and Kashmir
- In office 21 February 2017 – 30 April 2018

Minister for Horticulture, Law, Justice and Parliamentary affairs Government of Jammu and Kashmir
- In office 1 May 2018 – 19 June 2018

Personal details
- Born: 17 September 1962 (age 64) Anantnag Jammu and Kashmir
- Spouse: Fozia Bukhari (m. 1999)
- Children: Alan Bukhari(daughter) and Alyaan Bukhari(son)
- Education: BA, PG Diploma in Tour and Travel management, Import Export management
- Alma mater: University of Kashmir

Syed Basharat Ahmad Bukhari (born 17 September 1962) is a broadcaster, poet and Former Cabinet Minister from Jammu and Kashmir, who has served as both a Member of the Legislative Council (MLC) and a Member of the Legislative Assembly (MLA) from the erstwhile Sangrama constituency.He has served as a minister holding key portfolios in the Government of Jammu and Kashmir, including Minister for Law, Justice, Parliamentary Affairs, Revenue, and Disaster Management, Relief, Rehabilitation and Reconstruction.

== Early life and education ==
Bukhari is from Kreeri, Baramulla district, Jammu and Kashmir. He is the son of Syed Rafi Ud din Bukhari. His wife is a teacher. He completed his B.A. in 1986 at a college affiliated with Kashmir University.

== Career ==
Syed Basharat Ahmad Bukhari began his public career as a broadcaster at All India Radio Kashmir, gaining immense popularity due to his powerful and deep voice and the social service he provided through his programs. His widespread recognition as a broadcaster prompted Mufti Mohammad Sayeed, the then Chief Minister, to personally encourage him to join politics. Bukhari emerged as a prominent political figure from Sangrama in Baramulla district and went on to serve in both houses of the erstwhile state legislature. He was elected as a Member of the Legislative Council (MLC) in 2004 and served until 2008, when he won his first election as a Member of the Legislative Assembly (MLA) from the now defunct Sangrama Assembly constituency, representing the Jammu and Kashmir Peoples Democratic Party (PDP). He was re-elected as MLA from the same constituency in 2014, securing 12,127 votes and defeating Shuib Nabi Lone of the Indian National Congress by a margin of 1,754 votes. During his tenure in government, Bukhari served as a cabinet minister in the Government of Jammu and Kashmir, holding key portfolios including Law, Justice, Parliamentary Affairs, Revenue, Horticulture, and Disaster Management, Relief, Rehabilitation and Reconstruction. In these roles, he was involved in legislative business, governance, and post-disaster relief and reconstruction efforts in the erstwhile state. In the 2024 Jammu and Kashmir Legislative Assembly election he lost from Wagoora-Kreeri.

== See also ==
- Shujaat Bukhari
