= Baramulla =

District in Jammu & Kashmir, India

Baramulla Varmul
- City administered by India
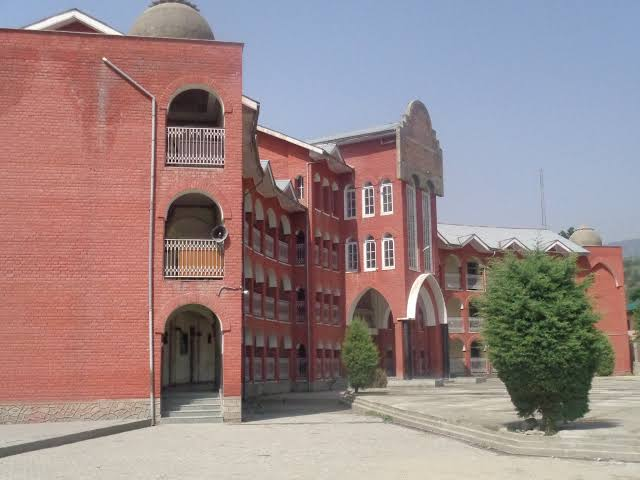
- Baramulla Public School in Baramulla, Jammu & Kashmir

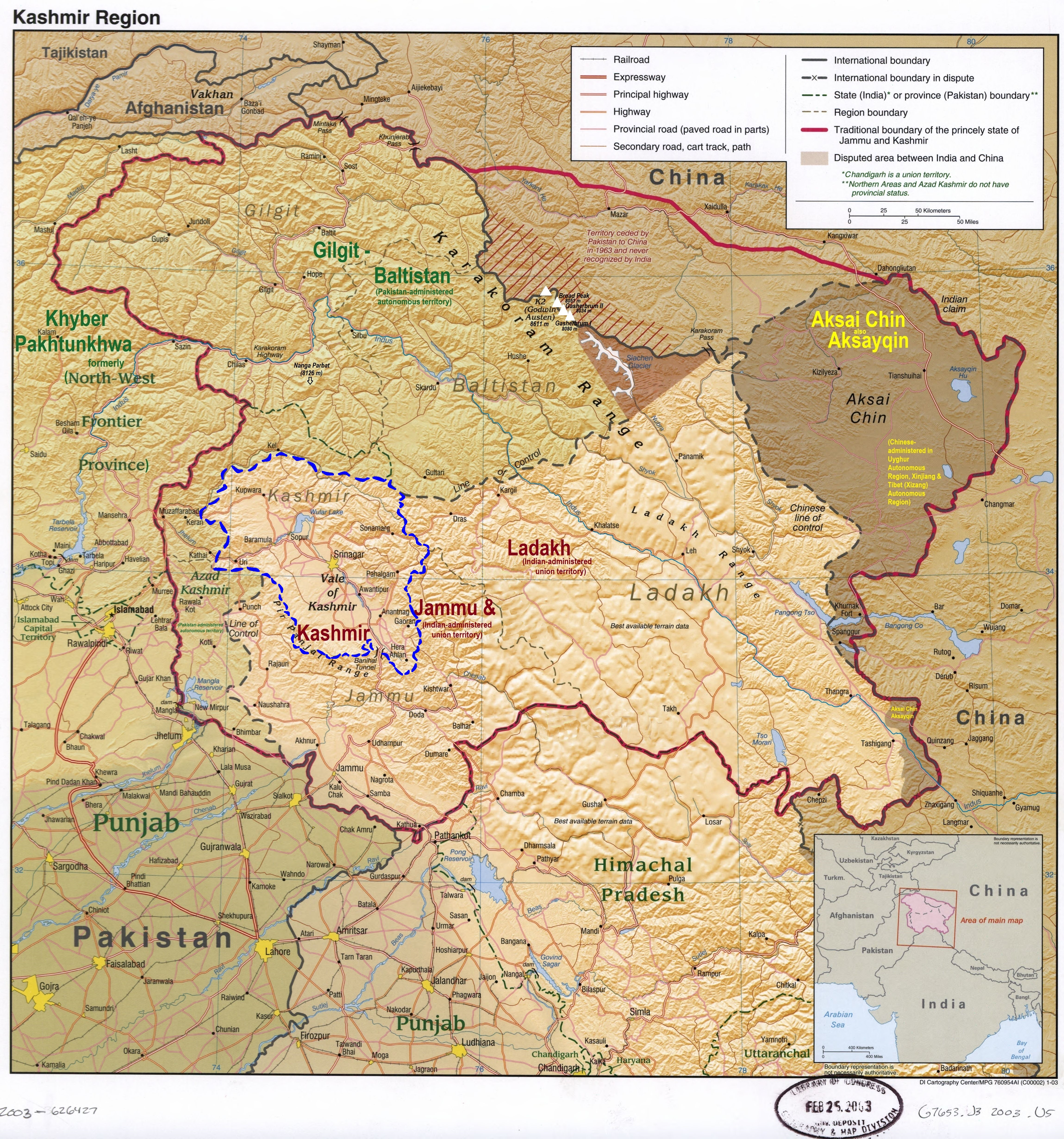
- Baramulla lies in the Kashmir division (neon blue) of the Indian-administered Jammu and Kashmir (shaded tan) in the disputed Kashmir region.
- Interactive map of Baramulla
- Coordinates: 34°12′31.284″N 74°20′36.592″E
- Administering country: India
- Union Territory: Jammu & Kashmir
- Division: Kashmir
- District: Baramulla
- Named for: Varaha

Government
  - Type: Municipal Council
  - Body: Municipal council Baramulla

Area
  - Total: 23.98 km^{2} (9.26 sq mi)

Population (2011)
  - Total: 71,434
  - Density: 2,979/km^{2} (7,715/sq mi)
- Demonym(s): Baramullan, Baramullia, Baramulli, Varmulyik

Languages
  - Official: Kashmiri, Urdu, Hindi, Dogri, English

Demographics
  - Literacy: 79.6%
  - Sex ratio: 846.9 ♀/ 1000 ♂
- Time zone: UTC+5:30 (IST)
- PIN: 193101 (New City), 193102 (Old City), 193103
- Telephone code: 01952
- Vehicle registration: JK-05
- Website: baramulla.nic.in

Baramulla (Urdu pronunciation: [bɑːɾɑːmuːlɑː]), also known as Varmul (Kashmiri pronunciation: [ʋarmul]) in Kashmiri, is a city and municipality of the Baramulla district of the Indian-administered Jammu and Kashmir in the disputed Kashmir region. It is also the administrative headquarters of the Baramulla district, located on the banks of the River Jhelum downstream from Srinagar, the summer capital of Jammu and Kashmir. The city was earlier known as gateway of Kashmir, serving as the major distribution centre for goods arriving in Kashmir valley through the Jhelum valley cart road. It is located within the Kashmir Valley on the foothills of the Pir Panjal Range.

The city was earlier known as Varāhamūla. The name is derived from two Sanskrit words, varāha (meaning wild boar) and mūla (meaning root/origin). The city was a major urban settlement and trade centre, before suffering extensive damage during the First Kashmir War. Currently, Baramulla is a major centre of business and education in northern Kashmir.

== Origin ==
The name Baramulla is derived from the Sanskrit Varāhamūla (वराहमूल), a combination of varāha (boar) and mūla (root or deep) meaning "boar's molar."

According to Hindu mythology, the Kashmir Valley was once a lake known as Satisaras (Parvati's Lake in Sanskrit). Ancient Hindu texts relate that the lake was occupied by the demon Jalodbhava (meaning "originated from water") until Lord Vishnu assumed the form of a boar and struck the mountain at Varahamula. This created an opening for the water to flow out of the lake.

The modern Baramulla was called Varahamulaksetra or Varahaksetra in the ancient days. Originally, it was a suburb of Huviskapura (modern Ushkur). Associated with the Adivaraha, the boar incarnation of Vishnu, it was considered very sacred. Consequently, many temples and monasteries were built in the ninth and tenth centuries, during the region of Lalitaditya Muktapida, (Queen) Sugandha, and Ksemagupta, when the worship of Vishnu flourished there.

== History ==
=== Ancient and medieval ===
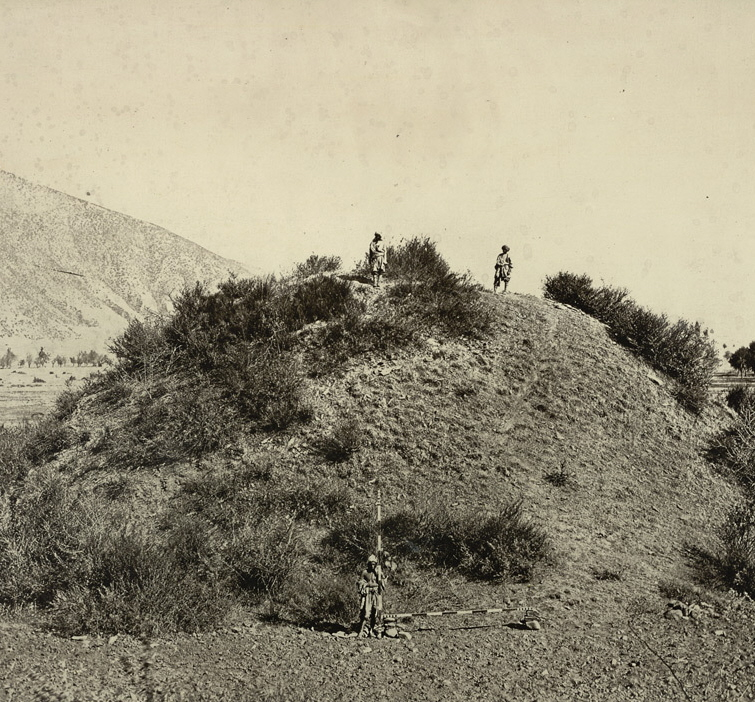
This general view of the unexcavated Buddhist stupa near Baramulla, with two figures standing on the summit, and another at the base with measuring scales, was taken by John Burke in 1868. The stupa, which was later excavated, dates to 500 CE.

According to some accounts the city of Baramulla was founded by Raja Bhimsina in 2306 B.C. A number of visitors have travelled to Baramulla, including Xuanzang from China and a British historian named Moorcraft. In 1508 A.D., Akbar, who entered the valley via Pakhil, spent several days at Baramulla. According to Tarikh-e-Hassan, the city was decorated during Akbar's stay. Jahangir stayed at Baramulla during his visit to Kashmir in 1620.

From the beginning, Baramulla has had religious importance. Hindu Teertha and Buddhist Vihars (monasteries) made the city sacred to both Hindus and Buddhists. During the 15th century, it became important to Muslims as well. Syed Janbaz Wali, who visited the valley with his companions in 1421, chose Baramulla as the center of his mission and was later buried there. His shrine attracts pilgrims from throughout the valley.

In 1620, the sixth Sikh Guru, Shri Hargobind, visited the city. In Baramulla Hindus, Muslims, Buddhists, and Sikhs lived in harmony and contributed to its culture.

Baramulla was the oldest and most-important town in northern Kashmir and Jammu (princely state) and Kashmir Valley (by the Rawalpindi-Murree-Muzaffarabad-Baramulla Road) until 27 October 1947. It was ceded to India when the Maharajah signed the instrument of accession on 26 October 1947. The city is the headquarters of the Baramulla district.

=== October 1947 atrocities during the First Kashmir War ===
Pashtun tribesmen from Pakistan (guided and aided by Pakistani army regulars in civilian clothes) launched a campaign to seize the state on 22 October 1947. They moved along the Rawalpindi-Murree-Muzaffarabad-Baramulla Road; Muzaffarabad fell on 24 October 1947, and Baramulla was captured the following day. Jammu and Kashmir State Forces of Maharaja Hari Singh led by Brig. Rajendra Singh fought back at Uri from 22–23 October but could not stop the advance.

In Baramulla, the advance slowed. Some tribesmen stopped to rape and kill Christian Missionary Nuns and nurses at St Joseph's Hospital in a looting spree. Thousands of Hindus and Sikhs were killed and thousands of young women, girls and children were kidnapped and taken captive.

On the morning of 27 October, India airlifted troops from Delhi to the Srinagar airfield while the tribal forces were still at Baramulla. The population of Baramulla town had been decimated from 14,000 to just 1,000 by killing of men and kidnapping of girls and women; and the prosperous and thriving town had been reduced to smouldering ruins in just five days. The Indian army took control of Baramulla on 9 November 1947.

==== Reports ====
Aastair Lamb wrote in Incomplete Partition, Roxford 1997, pp. 186–187:

The (tribal) leaders completely lost control over their men, an orgy of killing was the result. This was certainly the case at St Joseph's College, Convent and Hospital, the site of what was to become one of the most publicised incidents of the entire Kashmir conflict. Here nuns, priests and congregation, including patients in the hospital, were slaughtered; and at the same time a small number of Europeans, notably Lt. Colonel D.O. Dykes and his wife, an Englishwoman preparing to leave the hospital that day with her new-born baby, Mother Teresalina, a twenty-nine-year-old Spanish nun who had been in Baramulla only a few weeks, as well as Mother Aldertrude, the Assistant Mother Superior, and one Mr Jose Barretto, husband of the doctor, met their deaths at tribal hands.

Charles Chenevix Trench wrote in The Frontier Scouts (1985):

In October 1947... tribal lashkars hastened in lorries – undoubtedly with official logistic support – into Kashmir... at least one British Officer, Harvey-Kelly took part in the campaign. It seemed that nothing could stop these hordes of tribesmen taking Srinagar with its vital airfield. Indeed nothing did, but their own greed. The Mahsuds in particular stopped to loot, rape and murder; Indian troops were flown in and the lashkars pushed out of the Vale of Kashmir into the mountains. The Mahsuds returned home in a savage mood, having muffed an easy chance, lost the loot of Srinagar and made fools of themselves.

Sam Manekshaw (later a field marshal) was a colonel in the Directorate of Military Operations who went to Srinagar with V. P. Menon to assess the situation on 26 October 1947. He later told in an interview:

Fortunately for Kashmir, the tribals were busy raiding, raping all along. In Baramulla they killed Colonel D.O.T. Dykes. Dykes and I were of the same seniority. We did our first year's attachment with the Royal Scots in Lahore, way back in 1934-5. Tom went to the Sikh regiment. I went to the Frontier Force regiment. We'd lost contact with each other. He'd become a lieutenant colonel. I'd become a full colonel. Tom and his wife were holidaying in Baramulla when the tribesmen killed them.

Tom Cooper of the Air Combat Information Group wrote, "The Pathans appeared foremost interested in looting, killing, ransacking and other crimes against the inhabitants instead of a serious military action."

According to Mohammad Akbar Khan (Colonel, Pakistan army, who was promoted as Brigadier and made in charge of sending the tribals to Kashmir and who had been a contemporary of Col. Dykes at Royal Military College, Sandhurst) in his War for Kashmir in 1947, "The uncouth raiders delayed in Baramulla for two (whole) days."

Biju Patnaik (later Chief Minister of Odisha) piloted the first plane to land at Srinagar airport that morning. He brought 17 soldiers from the 1st Sikh Regiment, commanded by Lt. Col. Dewan Ranjit Rai. The pilot flew low over the airstrip twice to ensure that no raiders were around. Instructions from Jawaharlal Nehru's office were clear: If the airport was taken over by the enemy, they were not to land. Taking a full circle, the DC-3 flew at ground level. Soldiers peered from the aircraft and found the airstrip empty. The raiders were too busy distributing the war booty among themselves in Baramulla.

Lt. Col. Dewan Ranjit Rai immediately moved with his small platoon towards Baramulla hoping to stop the tribal raiders at the mouth of the funnel which opens 5 km east of Baramulla into a wide valley. He led his men from the front and died of bullet wound the same day, 27 October 1947, at Patan but delayed the raiders for a day. Satrina village in Baramulla, Ichama and Atna village in Budgam were defended by the Indian troops. As more Indian troops flew into Srinagar the next day, they started pushing the raiders back. It took two weeks for the Indian army to evict the raiders (who had been joined by Pakistani regulars and were well-entrenched) from Baramulla on 9 November 1947.

Sheikh Abdullah spoke to the UN Security Council on 5 February 1948: "The raiders came to our land, massacred thousands of people – mostly Sikhs, but Hindus and Muslims, too – abducted thousands of girls, Hindus, Sikhs and Muslims alike, looted our property and almost reached the gates of our summer capital, Srinagar."

Robert Trumbull, The New York Times, 10 November 1947; reporting from Baramulla [UN doc # S/PV.762/Add.1/Annex 1/No. 26]: The raid of the convent is narrated in even gory details by Father Shanks, one of the fortunate survivors and the anonymous 'witnesses' in the following report.

"The tribesmen - great, wild, black beasts they were - came shooting their way down from the hills on both sides of the town. They climbed over the hospital walls from all sides. The first group burst into a ward firing at the patients. A 20-year-old Indian nurse, Philomena, tried to protect a Muslim patient whose baby had just been born. She was shot dead first. The Patient was next. Mother Superior Aldetude rushed into the ward, knelt over Philomena and was at once attacked and robbed. The Assistant Mother, Teresalina, saw a tribesman point a rifle at Mother Aldetrude and jumped in front of her. A bullet went through Teresalina's heart. At the moment Colonel Dykes, who had assured us we would not be attacked, raced from his room a few yards along the terrace to get the Mother Superior out of danger, shouting at the tribesmen as he ran. But the Mother Superior fell shot, and Colonel Dykes collapsed beside her with a bullet in the stomach. Mrs Dykes ran from her husband's room to help him. She too was shot dead.

While this went on, Mr Gee Boretto, an Anglo-Indian, was killed in the garden before nine Christian Nuns. Then the nuns were lined up before a firing squad. As the tribesmen raised their rifles a young Afridi Officer, who once studied in a Convent School at Peshawar, rushed in and stopped them. At least there are living features of human quality in these incidents. He had been told his men were raiding a Convent, and had run all the way from the town. That saved all our lives by a few seconds.

We did not find Mrs Dykes until the following day. She had been thrown down a well."

Father Shank of the Convent [UN doc # S/PV.762/Add.1/Annex 1/No. 27]:

"Their buses and trucks, loaded with booty, arrived every other day and took more Pathans to Kashmir. Ostensibly they wanted to liberate their Kashmir Muslim brothers, but their primary objective was to riot and loot. In this they made no distinction between Hindu, Sikhs and Muslims. The raiders advanced in Baramulla, the biggest commercial centre of the region with a population of 11,000 until they were only an hour away from Srinagar. For the next three days they were engaged in massive plunder, rioting and rape. No one was spared. Even members of the St. Joseph's Mission Hospital were brutally massacred." - 'Half Way to Freedom' by Margaret Bourke-White

Andrew Whitehead, who was BBC correspondent in India, reported on the October 1947 atrocities in Baramulla, particularly on the Christian mission convent and hospital, in his book A Mission in Kashmir.

== Geography ==
Baramulla is on the Jhelum River, at its highest point. Baramulla tehsil is stretched from Village Khushalpora in the east to village Boniyar in the west. The old town is on the north bank of the river, and the new town is on the south bank. They are connected by five bridges, including a suspension bridge connecting Gulnar Park and Dewan Bagh. Five more bridges are being built or are planned. A bridge will connect the Khanpora and Drangbal areas of the city.

The old town is densely populated and smaller than the new town. Government offices, hospitals, the bus station and most other facilities are in the new town. The Baramulla railway station is on the eastern end of the new town, on the river. Beyond the old town, the river divides into two channels at Khadanyar (near police headquarters), forming an island known as Eco Park.

Baramulla is located at 34.2° N 74.34° E. It has an average elevation of 1,593 meters (5,226 feet).

== Climate ==
Baramulla has a temperate climate, with cold, snowy winters and warm summers.

Climate data for Baramulla (1971–1986)
| Month | Jan | Feb | Mar | Apr | May | Jun | Jul | Aug | Sep | Oct | Nov | Dec | Year |
|---|---|---|---|---|---|---|---|---|---|---|---|---|---|
| Mean daily maximum °C (°F) | 6 (43) | 9 (48) | 14 (57) | 20 (68) | 24 (75) | 27 (81) | 28 (82) | 28 (82) | 26 (79) | 21 (70) | 14 (57) | 8 (46) | 19 (66) |
| Mean daily minimum °C (°F) | −3 (27) | −1 (30) | 3 (37) | 6 (43) | 10 (50) | 13 (55) | 16 (61) | 16 (61) | 11 (52) | 5 (41) | 0 (32) | −2 (28) | 6 (43) |
| Average precipitation mm (inches) | 118 (4.6) | 128 (5.0) | 161 (6.3) | 135 (5.3) | 91 (3.6) | 60 (2.4) | 80 (3.1) | 80 (3.1) | 50 (2.0) | 40 (1.6) | 40 (1.6) | 93 (3.7) | 1,076 (42.3) |
| Average precipitation days (≥ 1.0 mm) | 6.6 | 7.3 | 10.2 | 8.8 | 8.1 | 5.7 | 7.9 | 6.8 | 3.5 | 2.8 | 2.8 | 5.1 | 75.6 |
Source: HKO

== Demographics ==
Baramulla is the fourth-most populous city in Jammu and Kashmir state. Baramulla's old town is known as Shehr-e-Khas, and its new town as Greater Baramulla.

Religion in Baramulla City (2011)
1. Islam (85.3%)
2. Sikhism (8.69%)
3. Hinduism (5.57%)
4. Christianity (0.29%)
5. Buddhism (0.03%)
6. Not Stated (0.14%)

As of 2011 India census, Baramulla had a population of 71,434. There were 38,677 males (54%) and 32,757 females (46%). Of the population, 8,878 (12.4%) were age 0-6: 4,851 males (55%) and 4,027 females (45%). The literacy rate for the people over six was 79.6% (males 87.3%, females 70.6%).

| Census | Baramula Urban Area | Baramula | Out Growths (OG) | | | | |
| Census | Baramula Urban Area | Baramula | Fateh Pora | Kanis Pora | Gotiyar | Frastahar | Takia Sultan |
|---|---|---|---|---|---|---|---|
| 1911 | 6,599 | 6,599 | | | | | |
| 1921 | 6,744 | 6,744 | | | | | |
| 1931 | 6,886 | 6,886 | | | | | |
| 1941 | 12,724 | 12,724 | | | | | |
| 1951 | 16,289 | 16,289 | | | | | |
| 1961 | 19,854 | 19,854 | | | | | |
| 1971 | 26,334 | 26,334 | | | | | |
| 1981 | 33,945 | 33,945 | | | | | |
| 2001 | 71,896 | 61,830 | 2,639 | 3,981 | 1,145 | 876 | 1,425 |
| 2011 | 71,434 | 58,053 | 1,973 | 6,019 | 1,414 | 1,751 | 2,224 |
Area in 2011
| km^{2} sq miles | 23.98; 9.26 | 8.35; 3.22 | 4.22; 1.63 | 5.70; 2.20 | 1.10; 0.42 | 0.53; 0.20 | 4.08; 1.58 |

=== Languages ===
The most commonly-used languages are Kashmiri and Urdu, followed by English, Pahari, Gojri and Punjabi.

== Education ==
St. Joseph's School is one of the oldest missionary schools in Kashmir. Other notable schools include Delhi Public School, Aarifeen School of Excellence, Baramulla Public School, GD Goenka Public School, Dagger Parivar School, Beacon House School, two Hanfia Model High Schools: Delina-B and Ushkura, Budding Bloom Experimental School, Islamia high school, Guru Nanak Dev School, Faizan Public School among others.

Baramulla has a number of government-run schools. Higher secondary schools are known as intermediate colleges. There are separate higher secondary schools for boys and girls further one Higher Secondary School in old Town, Baramulla has a Kendriya Vidyalaya, Navodaya Vidayala in Shahkot and Sainik (military) school, both affiliated with the Central Board of Secondary Education. Baramulla has separate government degree colleges for men and women, and a medical college associated with the district hospital. The north campus of the University of Kashmir is located outskirts the Baramulla town, and an engineering college has been established. CIIIT is only Institute in kashmir valley which is located in kanispora area of Baramulla Baramulla has the government Baramulla Polytechnic College, which was established in 2012. It is in the Kanispora area of Baramulla city. The polytechnic teaches three-year diploma courses in electrical engineering and architecture. Government Medical college Baramulla has started functioning the normal classes since August 2018.

== Healthcare ==
Baramulla has District Medical Hospital and District Veterinary Hospital, with radiology (x-ray) and ultrasonography facilities. A new building for the veterinary hospital, is under construction which is near to completion and has got the indoor facilities for the pet animal patients.The District Medical Hospital is 300 bedded hospital and has all the specialisation facilities available.

Baramulla has a privately run facility for mothers and child hospital called St Joseph's Hospital. It was started in 1921 and is running smoothly to the entire satisfaction of the populace.

Government Medical College, Baramulla was inaugurated in year 2018 and started its function from its first batch in year 2019.

== Eco Park ==
Eco Park is on the island in the middle of Jhelum river on the road from Baramulla town to Uri. It was developed by J&K Tourism Development Corporation. It is a popular destination for locals particularly on summer evenings and is rapidly developing into a major tourist attraction.

A cable car project and expansion of Eco Park are planned.

== Transport ==
=== Road ===
==== From Srinagar ====
Baramulla is about 55 km (34 mi) from Srinagar, capital of Jammu and Kashmir state. National Highway NH-1 starting from the Line of Control and passing through Uri connects the city with Srinagar and continues to Leh. NH-1 was formerly called NH-1A before renumbering of all national highways by National Highway Authority of India in 2010 year. NH-1 joins NH-44 at Srinagar. Taxi and bus service is available from Srinagar and Jammu. The road from Srinagar to Baramulla is regarded as the best motorable 4 lane road and best maintained road in the valley.

==== From Uri and Muzaffarabad ====
The 123-kilometre (76 mi) road from Muzaffarabad to Baramulla runs along the Jhelum River. On the Pakistani side, it is known as "Srinagar Road." Starting from Domel Bridge, Muzaffarabad and ending at the Chaktothi-Uri Border Crossing at LOC It crosses the Line of Control and passes through Uri, 45 km (28 mi) west of Baramulla as National Highway NH-1. The first 5 kilometres (3.1 mi) of the road from Uri to Baramulla does not run along the river, but the remaining 40 km (25 mi) is scenic, passing wooded mountainsides and cliffs. The road was reopened in 2005 for controlled travel by bus but again closed in 2019.

==== From Kupwara via Watergam ====
Baramulla is connected to Kupwara by National Highway NH-701 a 130-km road from Baramulla to Tangdhar passing through towns of Watergam and Handwara. The distance from Baramulla to Watergam is 15 km whereas from Baramulla to Handwara is 29 km. The distance from Kupwara to Baramulla is 47 km.

=== Air ===
Sheikh-ul-Alam International Airport at Srinagar is the nearest airport, 60 km (37 mi) southeast; The Jammu Airport, in the winter capital of the state.

=== Train ===
Baramulla is the last station on the 119-kilometre (74 mi)-long Baramulla-Srinagar-Banihal-Sangaldan railway line, opened partially in October 2009 and later extended, connecting with Srinagar, Qazigund and Banihal across the Pir Panjal mountains through the 11.2-kilometre (7.0 mi)-long Banihal railway tunnel. This railway track is planned to connect with the Indian Railways Network through Chenab Rail Bridge.

The nearest railway terminus for long-distance trains is Katra, about 276 km (171 mi) south.

== See also ==
- Jammu and Kashmir
- Baramulla district
- Gulmarg
