= Baramulla district =

District in Jammu and Kashmir, India

Baramulla district Varmul district
- District
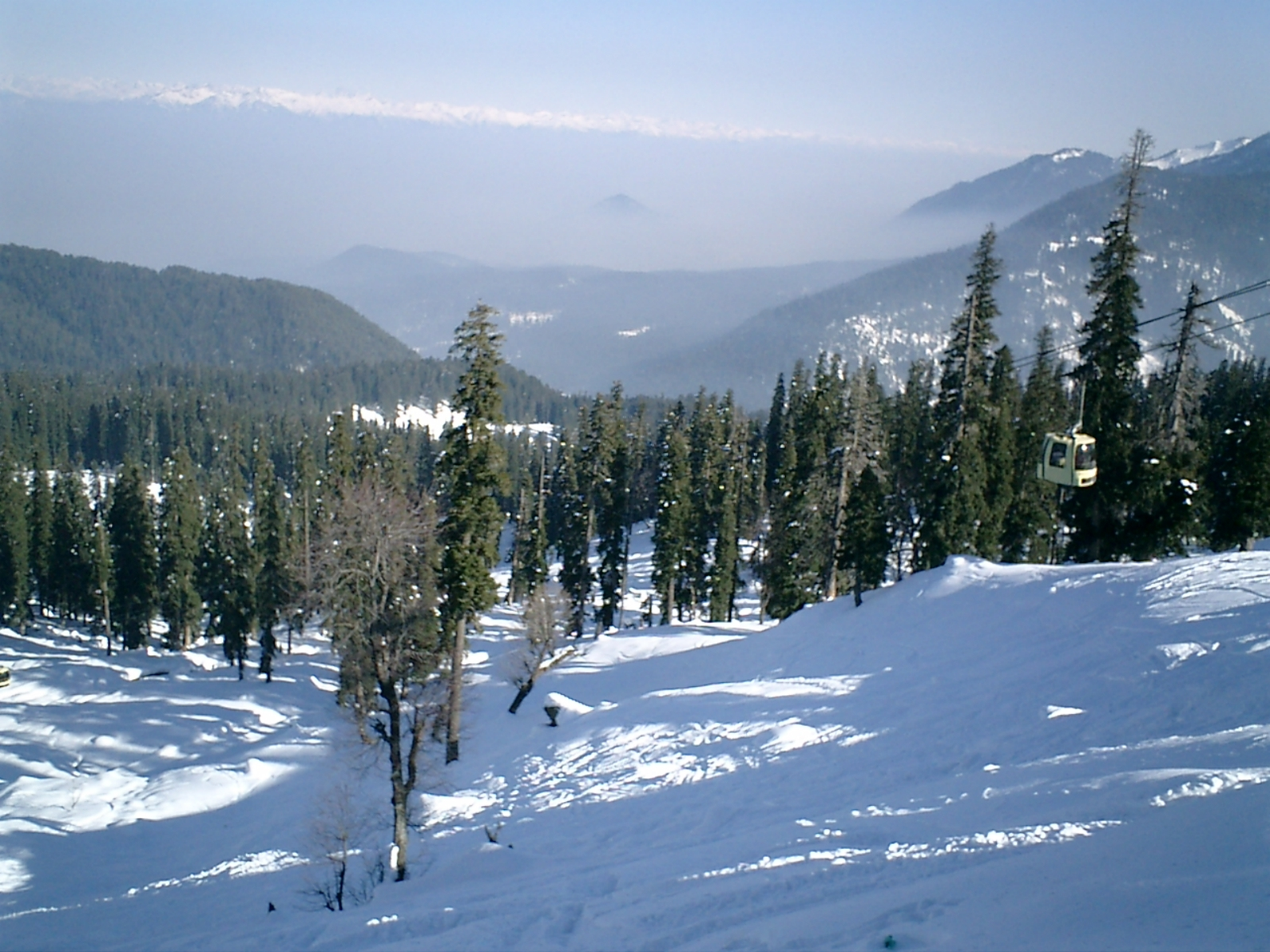
- Gulmarg ski resort in Baramulla district, Jammu and Kashmir, India

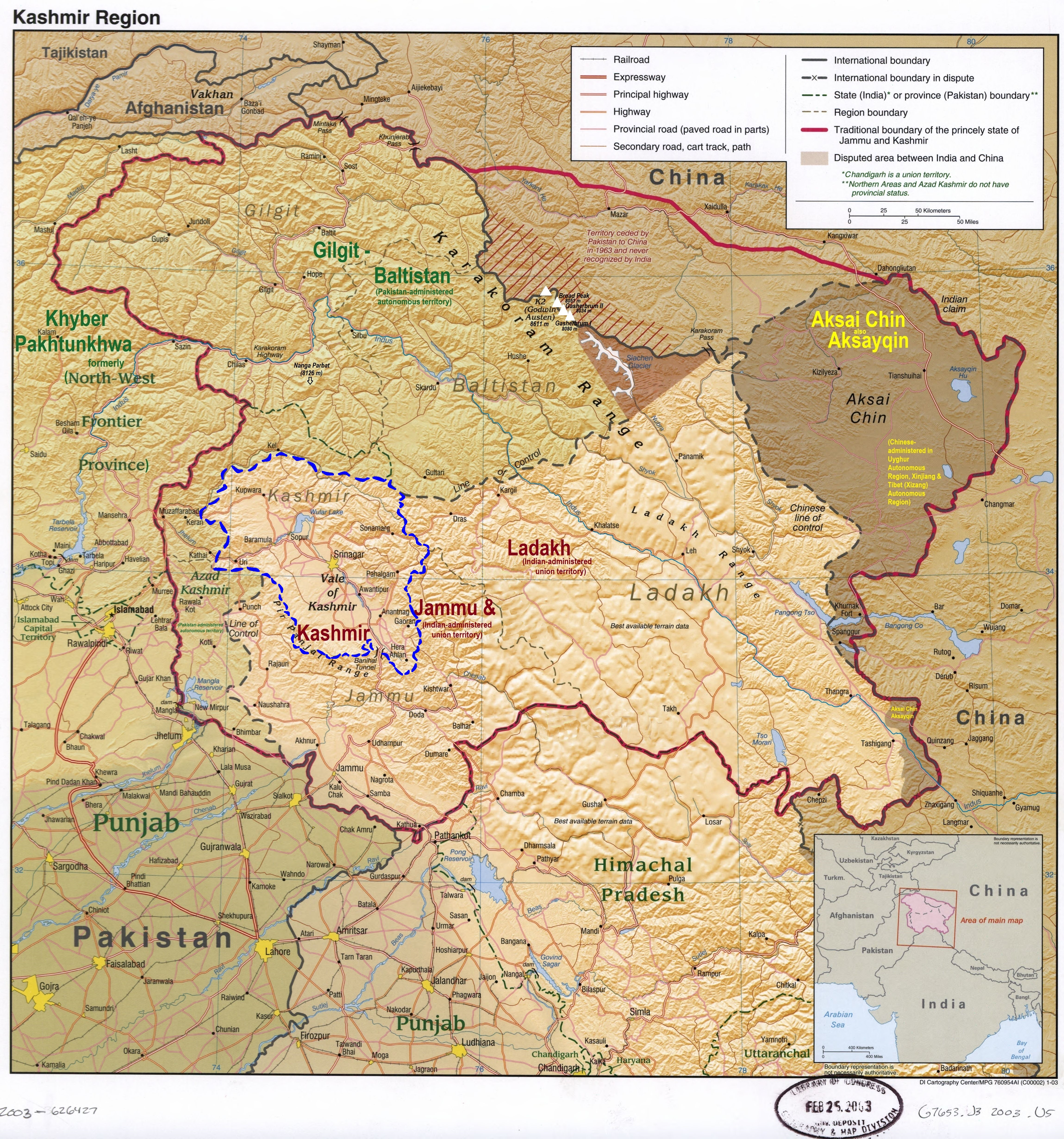
- Baramulla district lies in the Kashmir division (neon blue) of the Indian-administered Jammu and Kashmir (shaded tan) in the disputed Kashmir region.
- Interactive map of Baramulla district
- Coordinates: 34.1980°N 74.3636°E
- Administering country: India
- Union territory: Jammu and Kashmir
- Division: Kashmir Division
- Region: North Kashmir
- Headquarters: Baramulla
- Tehsils: 1. Uri; 2. Baramulla; 3. Tangmarg; 4. Pattan; 5. Boniyar; 6. Wagoora; 7. Zaingeer (Sopore); 8. Rohama; 9. Kreeri; 10. Watergam; 11. Sopore; 12. Dangiwacha; 13. Dangerpora; 14. Khoie (Panzipora); 15. Kunzer; 16. Kawarhama

Government
  - District Magistrate: Syeed Fakhrudin Hamid (IAS)

Area
  - District: 4,190 km^{2} (1,620 sq mi)
  - Urban: 63.56 km^{2} (24.54 sq mi)
  - Rural: 4,179.44 km^{2} (1,613.69 sq mi)

Population (2011)
  - District: 1,008,039
  - Density: 241/km^{2} (623/sq mi)
  - Urban: 825,539
  - Rural: 182,500

Languages
  - Official: Kashmiri, Urdu, Hindi, Dogri, English
  - Main spoken: Kashmiri
  - Other spoken: Pahari, Gujari
- Time zone: UTC+5:30 (IST)
- Vehicle registration: JK05
- Website: baramulla.nic.in

Baramulla district is one of the 20 districts in the Indian-administered union territory of Jammu and Kashmir (J&K) in the disputed Kashmir region. Baramulla town is the administrative headquarters of this district. The district covered an area of 4,588 km^{2} (1,771 sq mi) in 2001, but it was reduced to 4,243 km^{2} (1,638 sq mi) at the time of 2011 census. In 2016, the district administration said that the area was 4,190 km^{2} (1,620 sq mi). Muslims constitute about 98% of the population.

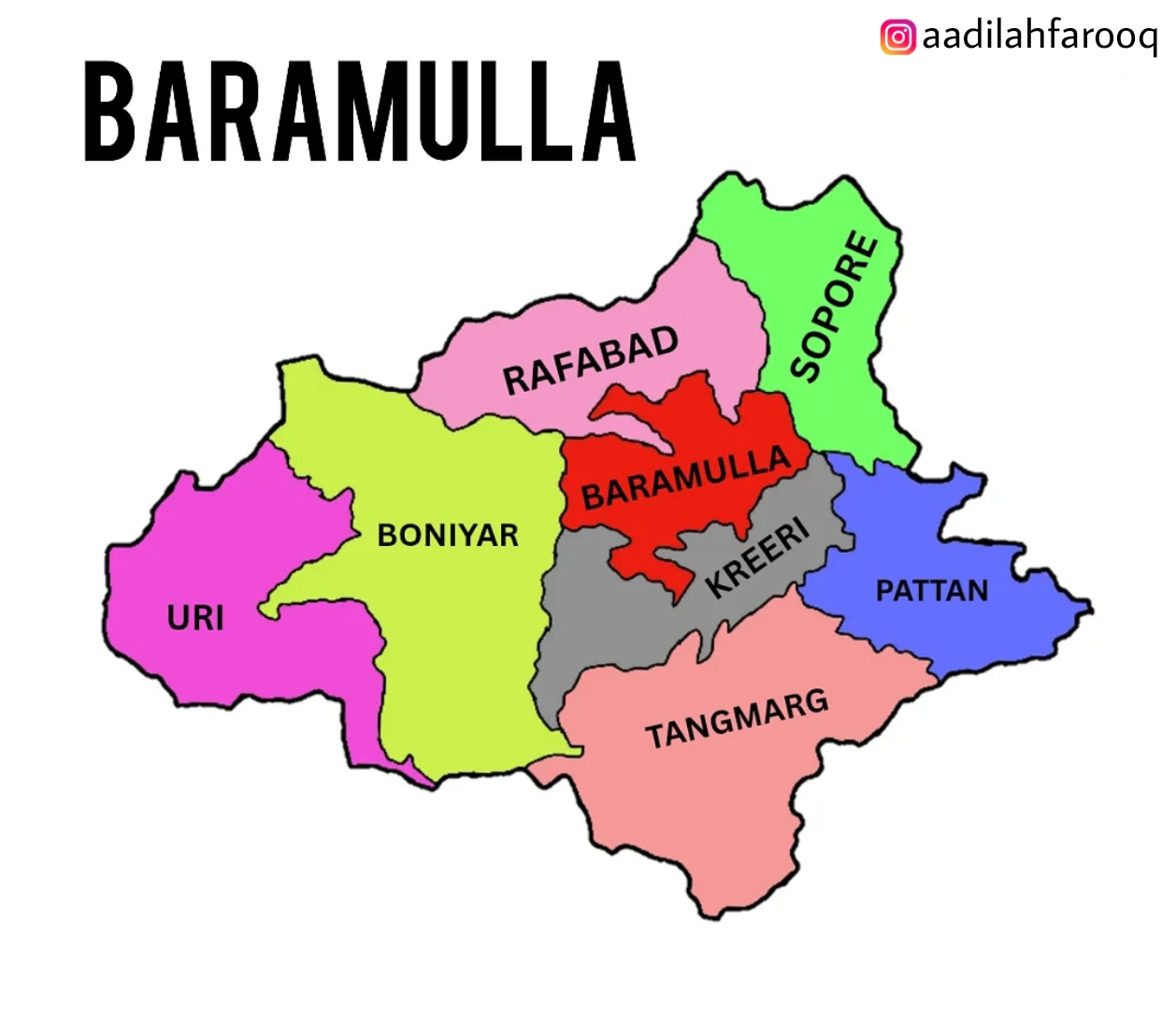
District map of Baramulla

== Etymology ==
The name Baramulla, meaning "Boar's Molar Place," is derived from two Sanskrit words Varaha (Boar) and Mula. According to Hindu texts, the Kashmir Valley was once a lake called Satisaras, the lake of Parvati (consort of Shiva). Hindu texts state that the lake was occupied by a demon, Jalodbhava, until Vishnu assumed the form of a boar and struck the mountain with his molar at Baramulla (ancient Varahamula). He bored an opening in it where the lake water flowed out.

== History ==
=== Pakistani tribal invasion (1947) ===
After the Partition of India in 1947, Maharaja Hari Singh chose to remain independent, not joining either India or Pakistan. A large number of tribals from Pakistan attacked Kashmir under the code name "Operation Gulmarg," intending to seize Kashmir. The invading tribals started moving along Rawalpindi-Murree-Muzaffarabad-Baramulla Road on 22 October 1947 with Pakistani army men in plain clothes. Muzaffarabad fell on 24 October 1947. They reached and captured Baramulla on 25 October. There they stayed for several days looting, raping, and killing residents; burning and plundering homes and businesses; and desecrating and vandalising shrines and temples. They could have reached Srinagar, just 50 km away, and captured its airfield, which was not defended at all. They raped and killed European nuns (only one survived) at Baramulla's St. Joseph convent and Christian nurses at the missionary hospital. This looting, raping, murder and abduction of girls continued for several days.

Charles Chenevix Trench writes in his The Frontier Scouts (1985):

In October 1947... tribal lashkars hastened in lorries – undoubtedly with official logistic support – into Kashmir... at least one British Officer, Harvey-Kelly took part in the campaign. It seemed that nothing could stop these hordes of tribesmen taking Srinagar with its vital airfield. Indeed nothing did, but their own greed. The Mahsuds in particular stopped to loot, rape and murder; Indian troops were flown in and the lashkars pushed out of the Vale of Kashmir into the mountains. The Mahsuds returned home in a savage mood, having muffed an easy chance, lost the loot of Srinagar and made fools of themselves.

Tom Cooper of Air Combat Information Group wrote:

...the Pathans appeared foremost interested in looting, killing, ransacking and other crimes against the inhabitants instead of a serious military action.

Biju Patnaik (who later became Chief Minister of Odisha) piloted the first plane to land at Srinagar airport that morning. He brought 17 soldiers of 1-Sikh regiment commanded by Lt. Col. Dewan Ranjit Rai.

"...The pilot flew low on the airstrip twice to ensure that no raiders were around... Instructions from PM Nehru’s office were clear: If the airport was taken over by the enemy, you are not to land. Taking a full circle the DC-3 flew ground level. Anxious eye-balls peered from inside the aircraft – only to find the airstrip empty. Nary a soul was in sight. The raiders were busy distributing the war booty amongst them in Baramulla."

In the words of Gen Mohammad Akbar Khan (Brigadier-in-Charge, Pakistan, in his book War for Kashmir in 1947): "The uncouth raiders delayed in Baramulla for two (whole) days for some unknown reason."

== Administration ==
Baramulla district comprises sixteen tehsils: Pattan, Uri, Kreeri, Boniyar, Tangmarg, Sopore, Watergam Rafiabad, Rohama, Dangiwacha, Bomai, Dangerpora, Khoie(Panzipora), Wagoora, Kunzer, Kwarhama and Baramulla.

This district consists of 26 blocks: Uri, Rohama, Rafiabad, Zaingeer, Sopore, Boniyar, Baramulla, Tangmarg, Singhpora, Pattan, Wagoora, Kunzer, Paranpillian, Bijhama, Norkhah, Narwav, Nadihal, Kandi Rafiabad, Hardchanum, Tujjar Sharief, Sangrama, Sherabad Khore, Lalpora, Wailoo, Khaipora and Chandil Wanigam. Pattan tehsil is the largest tehsil of District Baramulla and was later split to form a separate Kreeri tehsil.

Pattan Town is situated in the centre of the district between Srinagar and Baramulla cities and is surrounded by villages like Palhalan, Nihalpora Hanjiwera Zangam, Sherpora, Sonium and Yall. Each block consists of a number of panchayats.

== Politics ==
Baramullah district has seven assembly constituencies: Uri, Rafiabad, Sopore, Wagoora-Kreeri, Baramulla, Gulmarg and Pattan.

== Demographics ==
Historical population
Year	Pop.	±%
1901	155,387	—
1911	174,661	+12.4%
1921	193,132	+10.6%
1931	215,286	+11.5%
1941	238,136	+10.6%
1951	261,935	+10.0%
1961	285,734	+9.1%
1971	374,175	+31.0%
1981	490,057	+31.0%
1991	638,634	+30.3%
2001	843,892	+32.1%
2011	1,008,039	+19.5%
† 1951 and 1991 populations are estimated Source: Census of India

Religion in Baramulla district (2011)
Religion	Percent
Islam	95.15%
Hinduism	3.04%
Sikhism	1.47%
Other or not stated	0.34%

According to the 2011 census Baramulla district had a population of 1,008,039, or 1,015,503, roughly equal to the nation of Cyprus or the US state of Montana. This gives it a ranking of 443rd in India (out of a total of 640). Of the total population, 542,171 (53.4%) were males and 473,332 (46.6%) were females, the sex ratio being 885 females for every 1,000 males (this varies with religion), a decrease from 905 in 2001 census, and much lower than the national average of 940. The sex ratio for children in 0 to 6 year age group was even less at 866.

The district has a population density of 305 inhabitants per square kilometre (790/sq mi). Its population growth rate over the decade 2001–2011 was 20.34%. Baramula has a literacy rate of 66.93%. with male literacy 77.35% and female literacy 55.01%. Total literate in Baramula district were 571,348 of which males and females were 352,289 and 219,059 respectively. 18.10% of the population lives in urban areas. Scheduled Castes and Scheduled Tribes make up 0.15% and 3.74% of the population respectively.

Baramulla town is the largest town in the district and the fourth most-populous town in the state, with a population of 167,986 as per 2011 census.

Sex Ratio in Baramula District in 2011 Census. (no. females per 1,000 males)
Religion (and population)	Sex Ratio
Muslim (pop 959,185)	936
Hindu (pop 30,621)	90
Sikh (pop 14,770)	627
Other (pop 3,463)	632
Total (pop 1,008,039)	885

Baramula district: religion, gender ratio, and % urban of population, according to the 2011 Census.
	Hindu	Muslim	Christian	Sikh	Buddhist	Jain	Other	Not stated	Total
Total	30,621	959,185	1,497	14,770	140	29	7	1,790	1,008,039
Total	3.04%	95.15%	0.15%	1.47%	0.01%	0.00%	0.00%	0.18%	100.00%
Male	28,099	495,434	965	9,078	115	17	4	1,021	534,733
Female	2,522	463,751	532	5,692	25	12	3	769	473,306
Gender ratio (% female)	8.2%	48.3%	35.5%	38.5%	17.9%	41.4%	42.9%	43.0%	47.0%
Sex ratio (no. of females per 1,000 males)	90	936	551	627	–	–	–	753	885
Urban	16,378	157,176	536	7,865	80	7	7	451	182,500
Rural	14,243	802,009	961	6,905	60	22	0	1,339	825,539
% Urban	53.5%	16.4%	35.8%	53.2%	57.1%	24.1%	100.0%	25.2%	18.1%

Languages of Baramulla district (2011 census)
1. Kashmiri (82.1%)
2. Pahari (9.88%)
3. Gojri (3.72%)
4. Hindi (1.58%)
5. Punjabi (1.26%)
6. Others (1.45%)

The most widely spoken language is Kashmiri (82.11% of the population according to the 2011 census), but there are also speakers of Pahari (9.88%), Gujari (3.45%), Hindi (1.58%) and Punjabi (1.26%). Kashmiri is the minority language in Uri and Boniyar tehsils along the Line of Control, where Pahari dominates.

== Geography and climate ==
The district is spread from Srinagar district and Ganderbal district in the east to the line of control in the west, and from Kupwara district in the north and Bandipore district in the northwest to Poonch district in the south and Badgam district in the southwest. Baramulla has cool climate under Köppen climate classification. In winter, generally between December and February, snowfall occurs. Gulmurg is popular destination for tourist all over world.

Baramulla city is located on the banks of Jhelum river at the highest point of the river. The old town lies on the north (right) bank of the river and the new town lies on the south (left) bank. They are connected by five bridges, including a suspension bridge connecting Gulnar park with Dewan Bagh.

== Tehsils ==
1. Baramulla
2. Boniyar
3. Dangerpora
4. Dangiwacha
5. Kawarhama
6. Khoie (Panzipora)
7. Kreeri
8. Kunzer
9. Narwav
10. Pattan
11. Rohama
12. Singh
13. Sopore
14. Tangmarg
15. Uri
16. Wagoora
17. Watergam
18. Zaingeer (Bomai)
