= Baramulla Lok Sabha constituency =

Lok Sabha constituency in Jammu and Kashmir

Coordinates: 34.202°N 74.352°E

Baramulla JK-1
- Lok Sabha constituency
- Interactive Map Outlining Baramulla Lok Sabha constituency

Constituency details
- Country: India
- Region: North India
- Union Territory: Jammu and Kashmir
- Established: 1967
- Total electors: 17,37,865
- Reservation: None

Member of Parliament
- 18th Lok Sabha
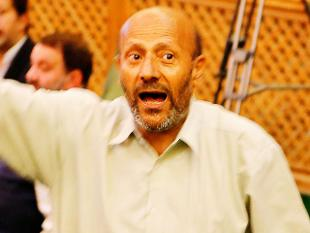
- Incumbent Sheikh Abdul Rashid
- Party: JKAIP
- Alliance: None
- Elected year: 2024

Baramulla Lok Sabha constituency is one of the five Lok Sabha (parliamentary) constituencies in Jammu and Kashmir in northern India. The 2024 election from this constituency was won by a Kashmiri separatist Engineer Rashid.

== Assembly segments ==
AC No.	AC Name	District	Member	Party
1	Karnah	Kupwara	Javaid Ahmad Mirchal	JKNC
2	Trehgam	Kupwara	Saifullah Mir	JKNC
3	Kupwara	Kupwara	Mir Mohammad Fayaz	JKPDP
4	Lolab	Kupwara	Qaysar Jamshaid Lone	JKNC
5	Handwara	Kupwara	Sajad Gani Lone	JKPC
6	Langate	Kupwara	Khursheed Ahmed Sheikh	IND
7	Sopore	Baramulla	Irshad Rasool Kar	JKNC
8	Rafiabad	Baramulla	Javid Ahmad Dar	JKNC
9	Uri	Baramulla	Sajjad Safi	JKNC
10	Baramulla	Baramulla	Javid Hassan Baig	JKNC
11	Gulmarg	Baramulla	Pirzada Farooq Ahmed Shah	JKNC
12	Wagoora-Kreeri	Baramulla	Irfan Hafiz Lone	INC
13	Pattan	Baramulla	Javaid Riyaz	JKNC
14	Sonawari	Bandipora	Hilal Akbar Lone	JKNC
15	Bandipora	Bandipora	Nizam Uddin Bhat	INC
16	Gurez (ST)	Bandipora	Nazir Ahmad Khan	JKNC
27	Budgam	Budgam	Aga Syed Muntazir Mehdi	JKPDP
28	Beerwah	Budgam	Shafi Ahmad Wani	JKNC

== Members of Parliament ==
Year	Winner	Party
1957	Shaikh Mohammed Akbar	Indian National Congress
1967	Syed Ahmed Aga	Indian National Congress
1971	Syed Ahmed Aga	Indian National Congress
1977	Abdul Ahad Vakil	Jammu & Kashmir National Conference
1980	Khwaja Mubarak Shah	Jammu & Kashmir National Conference
1983^	Saifuddin Soz	Jammu & Kashmir National Conference
1984	Saifuddin Soz	Jammu & Kashmir National Conference
1989	Saifuddin Soz	Jammu & Kashmir National Conference
1996	Ghulam Rasool Kar	Indian National Congress
1998	Saifuddin Soz	Jammu & Kashmir National Conference
1999	Abdul Rashid Shaheen	Jammu & Kashmir National Conference
2004	Abdul Rashid Shaheen	Jammu & Kashmir National Conference
2009	Sharifuddin Shariq	Jammu & Kashmir National Conference
2014	Muzaffar Hussain Baig	Jammu & Kashmir People's Democratic Party
2019	Mohammad Akbar Lone	Jammu & Kashmir National Conference
2024	Sheikh Abdul Rashid	Independent

^ by poll

== Election results ==
Vote share of Winning candidates
2024	45.70%
2019	29.29%
2014	37.61%
2009	46.01%
2004	38.13%
1999	43.94%
1998	43.21%
1996	36.09%
1989	93.79%
1984	69.69%
1980	67.57%
1977	59.50%
1971	51.02%
1967	55.60%

=== 2024 ===
2024 Indian general elections: Baramulla
Party	Candidate	Votes	%	±%
JKAIP	Sheikh Abdul Rashid	472,481	45.70	▲24.58
JKNC	Omar Abdullah	268,339	25.95	▼3.74
JKPC	Sajjad Gani Lone	173,239	16.76	▼6.74
JKPDP	Fayaz Ahmad Mir	27,488	2.66	▼9.12
NOTA	None of the Above	4,984	0.49	▼1.29
Majority		204,142	19.74	▲13.10
Turnout		1,033,900	59.49	▲24.60
Independent gain from JKNC		Swing		

=== 2019 ===
2019 Indian general elections: Baramulla
Party	Candidate	Votes	%	±%
JKNC	Mohammad Akbar Lone	133,426	29.29	▼2.05
JKPC	Raja Aijaz Ali	1,03,193	22.65	▲7.38
IND	Sheikh Er Rashid	1,02,168	22.43	New
JKPDP	Abdul Qayoom Wani	53,530	11.75	▼25.86
INC	Haji Farooq Ahmad Mir	34,532	7.58	New
NOTA	None of the Above	8,128	1.78	
BJP	M. M. War	7,894	1.73	▲0.32
Majority		30,053	6.64	▲0.37
Turnout		4,57,931	34.89	▼4.24
JKNC gain from JKPDP		Swing		

=== 2014 ===
2014 Indian general elections: Baramulla
Party	Candidate	Votes	%	±%
JKPDP	Muzaffar Hussain Baig	175,277	37.61	▲6.29
JKNC	Sharifuddin Shariq	1,46,058	31.34	▼14.67
JKPC	Salamuddin Bajad	71,154	15.27	▲0.45
IND	Er. Abdul Rashid Sheikh	22,090	4.74	New
IND	Abdul Hussain	7,301	1.57	New
BJP	Gulam Mohammad Mir	6,558	1.41	New
NOTA	None of the Above	4,568	0.98	New
Majority		29,219	6.27	▼8.42
Turnout		4,65,992	39.13	▼2.71
JKPDP gain from JKNC		Swing	▼8.40	

=== 2009 ===
2009 Indian general elections: Baramulla
Party	Candidate	Votes	%	±%
JKNC	Sharifuddin Shariq	203,022	46.01	▲7.88
JKPDP	Mohammad Dilawar Mir	1,38,208	31.32	▼3.86
JKPC	Sajjad Gani Lone	65,403	14.82	
IND.	Gowsia Bashir	5,848	1.33	
Majority		64,814	14.69	▲11.74
Turnout		4,41,234	41.84	▲6.19
JKNC hold		Swing		

=== 2004 ===
2004 Indian general elections: Baramulla
Party	Candidate	Votes	%	±%
JKNC	Abdul Rashid Shaheen	127,653	38.13	
JKPDP	Nizamuddin Bhat	1,17,758	35.18	
INC	Ghulam Rasool Kar	62,316	18.61	
Independent	Mir Khursheed Abbasi	10,569	3.16	
BJP	Mohmad Akbar	9,003	2.69	
JKNPP	Syed Mohd Rafiq Shah	7,471	2.23	
Majority		9,895	2.95	
Turnout		3,34,770	35.65	
JKNC hold		Swing		

=== 1999 ===
1999 Indian general election: Baramulla
Party	Candidate	Votes	%	±%
JKNC	Abdul Rashid Shaheen	84,243	43.94	
Independent	Muzaffar Hussain Baig	48,130	25.10	
JKAL	Ghulam Nabi Mir	25,697	13.40	
Independent	Saif-ud-Din Soz	11,230	5.86	
JP	Susheel Kumar	8,979	4.68	
JD(S)	Nazir Ahmad	6,681	3.48	
BJP	Mohd Sultan	2,680	1.40	
Independent	Gyani Sant Singh	1,594	0.83	
Independent	Mohd. Yasin	1,532	0.80	
Independent	Wali Mohd Wani	969	0.51	
Majority		36,113	18.84	
Turnout		2,12,180	27.79	
JKNC hold		Swing		

=== 1998 ===
1998 Indian general election: Baramulla
Party	Candidate	Votes	%	±%
JKNC	Saif-ud-Din Soz	131,164	43.21	
Independent	Muzaffar Hussain Baig	93,179	30.69	
JKAL	Abdul Majid Gawali	20,843	6.87	
INC	Abdul Gani Vakil	11,702	3.85	
BJP	Din Mohmad Chichi (Cheeta)	4,115	1.36	
Others	4 Other Parties	7,921	2.62	
Independent	20 Independent Candidates	34,644	11.44	
Majority		37,985	12.52	
Turnout				
Swing to JKNC from INC		Swing		

=== 1996 ===
1996 Indian general election: Baramulla
Party	Candidate	Votes	%	±%
INC	Ghulam Rasool Kar	110,331	36.09	
Independent	Ghulam Nabi Mir	45,350	14.83	
Independent	Abdul Ahad Yatoo	26,343	8.62	
JD	Sheikh Mohammad Sadiq	25,554	8.36	
Independent	Din Mohammad Chatta	24,628	8.06	
JKNPP	Dil Jeet Singh	21,038	6.88	
Independent	Giani Sant Singh	18,331	6.00	
Independent	Niranjan Nath Kaul	12,261	4.01	
Independent	Mohd Yaseen	11,568	3.78	
Independent	Wali Mohd	10,336	3.38	
Majority		64,981	21.26	
Turnout		3,28,688	46.65	
Swing to INC from JKNC		Swing		

=== 1991 ===
The 1991 Indian general election was not held in Jammu and Kashmir due to severe insurgency and the breakdown of law and order that peaked between 1990 and 1991. During this period, the state was under Governor's Rule and direct Central Government administration from January 1990 to October 1996, with Lok Sabha elections resuming only in May 1996.

=== 1989 ===
1989 Indian general election: Baramulla
Party	Candidate	Votes	%	±%
JKNC	Saif-ud-Din Soz	35,139	93.79	
Independent	Sheikh Abdul Rahman	719	1.92	
Independent	Giani Sant Singh	620	1.65	
Independent	Bashir Ahmad Azad	399	1.06	
Independent	Mohd. Yaseen	362	0.97	
Independent	Ghulam Ahmed Tilgami	227	0.61	
Majority		34,420	91.87	
Turnout		38,235	5.48	
JKNC hold		Swing		

=== 1984 ===
1984 Indian general election: Baramulla
Party	Candidate	Votes	%	±%
JKNC	Saif-ud-Din Soz	234,357	69.69	
Independent	Mohi-ud-Din Wani	93,938	27.93	
Independent	Ghulam Ahmad Ganai	7,998	2.38	
Majority		1,40,419	41.76	
Turnout		3,48,963	61.09	
JKNC hold		Swing		

=== 1980 ===
1980 Indian general election: Baramulla
Party	Candidate	Votes	%	±%
JKNC	Khawaja Mubarak Shah	178,533	67.57	
Independent	Muzaffar Hussain Beg	75,256	28.48	
Independent	Sheikh Abdul Rehman	5,333	2.02	
Independent	Ghulam Ahmed	5,110	1.93	
Majority		1,03,277	39.09	
Turnout		2,73,949	56.02	
JKNC hold		Swing		

=== 1977 ===
1977 Indian general election: Baramulla
Party	Candidate	Votes	%	±%
JKNC	Abdul Ahad	147,222	59.50	New entry
Independent	Syed Ali Shah Geelani	1,00,202	40.50	N/A
Majority		47,020	19.00	▲11.05
Turnout		2,58,507	56.97	
Swing to JKNC from INC		Swing		

=== 1971 ===
1971 Indian general election: Baramulla
Party	Candidate	Votes	%	±%
INC	Syed Ahmad Agha	93,041	51.02	▼4.58
Independent	Syed Ali Shah Gilani	78,543	43.07	N/A
Independent	Syed Zalim Shah	9,420	5.17	N/A
Independent	Sant Singh Tegh	1,374	0.75	N/A
Majority		14,498	7.95	▼3.25
Turnout		1,87,484	50.62	
INC hold		Swing		

=== 1967 ===
1967 Indian general election: Baramulla
Party	Candidate	Votes	%	±%
INC	Syed Ahmad Agha	101,769	55.60	
JKNC	A. G. Malik	81,254	44.40	
Majority		20,515	11.20	
Turnout		1,88,657	51.35	
INC hold		Swing		

== See also ==
- Bandipora district
- Baramulla district
- Kupwara district
- Budgam district
- List of constituencies of the Lok Sabha
