= List of Rajya Sabha members from Jammu and Kashmir =

The list of current and past Rajya Sabha members from the Jammu and Kashmir Union territory. The UT elects 4 member for a term of 6 years and are indirectly elected by the members of the Jammu and Kashmir legislative assembly

== Current members ==
Keys: JKNC (3) BJP (1)

#	Name	Party	Term start	Term end
1	Sajjad Ahmad Kichloo	JKNC	25-Oct-2025	24-Oct-2031
2	Chowdry Mohammad Ramzan	JKNC	25-Oct-2025	24-Oct-2031
3	Gurwinder Singh Oberoi	JKNC	25-Oct-2025	24-Oct-2031
4	Sat Paul Sharma	BJP	25-Oct-2025	24-Oct-2031

== Chronological list of all Rajya Sabha members from Jammu and Kashmir state ==
Chronological list

The list is incomplete.

- * represents current members

Name	Party	Date of appointment	Date of retirement	Term	Notes
Chowdry Mohammad Ramzan	JKNC	24/10/2025	23/10/2031	1	*
Sajjad Ahmad Kichloo	JKNC	24/10/2025	23/10/2031	1	*
Sat Paul Sharma	BJP	24/10/2025	23/10/2031	1	*
Gurwinder Singh Oberoi	JKNC	24/10/2025	23/10/2031	1	*
Ghulam Nabi Azad	INC	16/02/2015	15/02/2021	5	
Nazir Ahmad Laway	JKPDP	16/02/2015	15/02/2021	1	
Fayaz Ahmad Mir	JKPDP	11/02/2015	10/02/2021	1	
Shamsheer Singh Manhas	BJP	11/02/2015	10/02/2021	1	
Ghulam Nabi Azad	INC	11/02/2009	10/02/2015	4	
Saifuddin Soz	INC	11/02/2009	10/02/2015	3	
Mohammad Shafi	JKNC	16/02/2009	15/02/2015	1	Res 12/1/2015
G. N. Ratanpuri	JKNC	04/08/2009	15/02/2015	1	
Farooq Abdullah	JKNC	30/11/2009	29/11/2015	2	16/05/2009
Ghulam Nabi Azad	INC	30/11/2002	29/11/2008	3rd	Res.-29/04/2006- CM of JK
Farooq Abdullah	JKNC	30/11/2002	29/11/2008	1	
Tarlok Singh Bajwa	JKPDP	26/11/2002	25/11/2008	1	
Saifuddin Soz	INC	30/11/2002	29/11/2008	2	
Aslam Chowdhary Mohammad	INC	30/11/2002	29/11/2008	1	
Ghulam Nabi Azad	INC	30/11/1996	29/11/2002	2nd	MH 1990-1996
Sharifuddin Shariq	JKNC	30/11/1996	29/11/2002	2	Res 26/10/2002, JK Assembly
Saifuddin Soz	JKNC	26/11/1996	25/11/2002	1	10/03/1998
Dr Karan Singh	JKNC	30/11/1996	29/11/2002	1	JK, Res 12/08/1999
Mirza Abdul Rashid	JKNC	29/03/2000	29/11/2002	1	bye 2000 res Dr Karan Singh
Kushok Thiksey	JKNC	08/04/1998	25/11/2002	1	bye 1998 res Soz
Shabbir Ahmad Salaria	JKNC	27/09/1989	21/10/1992	1	bye 1989 Sayeed
Mufti Mohammad Sayeed	INC	22/10/1986	21/10/1992	1	Disqual. 28/07/1989 UP 1992-96
Tirath Ram Amla	INC	12/12/1985	11/12/1991	4	
Dharam Pal	INC	03/04/1988	02/04/1994	1	LS 27/11/1989
Rajendra Prasad Jain	INC	03/04/1988	02/04/1994	1	LS 27/11/1989
Ghulam Rasool Matto	OTH	03/04/1988	02/04/1994	2	
Ghulam Rasool Matto	OTH	03/04/1982	02/04/1988	1	
Dharam Chander Prashant	IND	03/04/1982	02/04/1988	1	
Ghulam Mohiuddin Shawl	JKNC	16/04/1980	15/04/1986	1	
Khwaja Mubarak Shah	JKNC	11/11/1978	10/11/1984	1	Res 10/01/1980 Elected to LS, Baramulla
Sharifuddin Shariq	JKNC	02/04/1980	10/11/1984	1	bye 1980 res Shah
Tirath Ram Amla	INC	04/05/1976	02/04/1982	3	
Om Mehta	INC	03/04/1976	02/04/1982	3	
Syed Nizamuddin	JP	16/04/1974	15/04/1980	1	
Syed Mir Qasim	INC	29/07/1975	10/11/1978	1	bye 1975 res Dhar
D. P. Dhar	INC	11/11/1972	07/02/1975	1	Res. 07/02/1975, Ambassador to USSR
Tirath Ram Amla	INC	04/05/1970	02/04/1976	2	
Om Mehta	INC	03/04/1970	02/04/1976	2	
Syed Hussain	INC	16/04/1968	15/04/1974	1	Res 5/3/1974
Ghulam Mohammad Mir	INC	03/04/1964	02/04/1970	1	Res.13/03/1967
A M Tariq	INC	04/05/1967	15/04/1968	2	bye 1967
Mohammad Shafi Qureshi	OTH	01/05/1965	30/04/1971	1	Res 23/1/1971 Elec LS- Anantnag
Om Mehta	INC	03/04/1964	02/04/1970	1	
Tirath Ram Amla	INC	04/05/1967	02/04/1970	1	bye 1967 res G Mir
Gulam Nabi Untoo	INC	11/11/1966	10/11/1972	1	
Krishan Dutta	OTH	11/11/1960	10/11/1966	1	
Khwaja Hakim Ali	OTH	22/08/1961	02/04/1962	1	bye 1961 dea Jalali
Syed Mohammad Jalali	JKNC	03/04/1956	02/04/1962	2	Death 22/02/1961
Pir Mohhmed Khan	JKNC	03/04/1958	02/04/1962	2	
Sardar Budh Singh	JKNC	03/04/1958	02/04/1964	2	
Maulana M Tayyebulla	JKNC	03/04/1958	02/04/1964	2	
Pandit Trilochan Dutta	INC	11/11/1954	10/11/1960	1	
Syed Mohammad Jalali	JKNC	03/04/1952	02/04/1956	1	
Pir Mohhmed Khan	JKNC	03/04/1952	02/04/1958	1	
Sardar Budh Singh	JKNC	03/04/1952	02/04/1958	1	
Maulana M Tayyebulla	JKNC	03/04/1952	02/04/1958	1	
Anant Ram Pandit	JKNC	03/04/1952	02/04/1954	1	
