= Rafiabad Assembly constituency =

Constituency of the Jammu and Kashmir legislative assembly in India

Coordinates: 34.255°N 74.393°E

Rafiabad
- Constituency No. 8 for the Jammu and Kashmir Legislative Assembly

Constituency details
- Country: India
- State: Jammu and Kashmir
- District: Baramulla
- Lok Sabha constituency: Baramulla
- Established: 1962

Member of Legislative Assembly
- Incumbent Javaid Ahmad Dar
- Party: Jammu and Kashmir National Conference
- Elected year: 2024

Rafiabad Assembly constituency is one of the 90 constituencies in the Jammu and Kashmir Legislative Assembly of Jammu and Kashmir a north state of India. Rafiabad is also part of Baramulla Lok Sabha constituency.

== Members of the Legislative Assembly ==
Election	Member	Party
1962	Ghulam Rasool Kar	Jammu & Kashmir National Conference
1967	Ghulam Rasool Kar	Indian National Congress
1972	Mohammed Yosuf Dar	Indian National Congress
1977	Mohammad Dilawar Mir	Jammu & Kashmir National Conference
1983	Mohammad Dilawar Mir	Jammu & Kashmir National Conference
1987	Ghulam Mohammed Khan	Jammu & Kashmir National Conference
1996	Mohammad Dilawar Mir	Janata Dal
2002	Mohammad Dilawar Mir	Jammu & Kashmir National Conference
2006 By-election	Mohammad Dilawar Mir	Jammu and Kashmir People's Democratic Party
2008	Javid Ahmad Dar	Jammu & Kashmir National Conference
2014	Yawar Ahmad Mir	Jammu and Kashmir People's Democratic Party
2024	Javid Ahmad Dar	Jammu and Kashmir National Conference

== Election results ==
=== Assembly Election 2024 ===
2024 Jammu and Kashmir Legislative Assembly election : Rafiabad
Party	Candidate	Votes	%	±%
JKNC	Javid Ahmad Dar	28,783	40.42%	New
JKAP	Yawar Ahmad Mir	19,581	27.50%	New
Independent	Muzafar Ahmad Dar	8,473	11.90%	New
JKPC	Abdul Gani Vakil	6,370	8.95%	▲3.39
Independent	Nazir Ahmad Mir	1,627	2.29%	New
DPAP	Sajad Ahmad Dar	1,456	2.04%	New
JKPDP	Altaf Hussain Malik	1,400	1.97%	▼30.35
NOTA	None of the Above	1,193	1.68%	▲0.67
Margin of victory		9,202	12.92%	▲8.71
Turnout		71,203	55.16%	▼14.01
Registered electors		1,29,092		▲61.03
JKNC gain from JKPDP		Swing	▲8.11	

=== Assembly Election 2014 ===
2014 Jammu and Kashmir Legislative Assembly election : Rafiabad
Party	Candidate	Votes	%	±%
JKPDP	Yawar Ahmad Mir	17,918	32.31%	▼2.99
INC	Abdul Gani Vakil	15,584	28.10%	▲7.67
JKNC	Javid Ahmad Dar	14,980	27.01%	▼8.88
JKPC	Khursheed Ahmad Khan	3,080	5.55%	New
Independent	Fayaz Ahmad Malik	776	1.40%	New
BJP	Desh Kumar Nehru	634	1.14%	New
JKNPP	Abdul Majeed Dar	483	0.87%	New
NOTA	None of the Above	556	1.00%	New
Margin of victory		2,334	4.21%	▲3.62
Turnout		55,451	69.17%	▲17.31
Registered electors		80,165		▲13.07
JKPDP gain from JKNC		Swing	▼3.58	

=== Assembly Election 2008 ===
2008 Jammu and Kashmir Legislative Assembly election : Rafiabad
Party	Candidate	Votes	%	±%
JKNC	Javid Ahmad Dar	13,198	35.89%	New
JKPDP	Mohammad Dilawar Mir	12,982	35.30%	▼20.28
INC	Abdul Gani Vakil	7,513	20.43%	New
Independent	Harbajan Singh	840	2.28%	New
JKANC	Ghulam Ahmad Dar	671	1.82%	New
Independent	Farooq Ahmad Yatoo	461	1.25%	New
BSP	Sona Ullah Lone	438	1.19%	New
Margin of victory		216	0.59%	▼16.52
Turnout		36,772	51.86%	▼23.66
Registered electors		70,900		▲5.78
JKNC gain from JKPDP		Swing	▼19.69	

=== Assembly By-election 2006 ===
2006 Jammu and Kashmir Legislative Assembly by-election : Rafiabad
Party	Candidate	Votes	%	±%
JKPDP	Mohammad Dilawar Mir	28,138	55.59%	▲32.80
JKNC	Mohammed Maqbool Mir	19,479	38.48%	New
BJP	Mohammed Maqbool War	1,760	3.48%	▲0.97
JKNPP	Abdul Khaliq Sheikh	1,244	2.46%	New
Margin of victory		8,659	17.11%	▲15.19
Turnout		50,621	75.52%	▲22.98
Registered electors		67,026		▲6.49
JKPDP gain from JKNC		Swing	▲20.58	

=== Assembly Election 2002 ===
2002 Jammu and Kashmir Legislative Assembly election : Rafiabad
Party	Candidate	Votes	%	±%
JKNC	Mohammad Dilawar Mir	11,576	35.00%	▲7.43
INC	Abdul Gani Vakil	10,944	33.09%	▲24.35
JKPDP	Javid Ahmad Dar	7,535	22.78%	New
Independent	Harbajan Singh Datta	1,106	3.34%	New
BJP	Mohamad Maqbool War	829	2.51%	▼2.43
Independent	Ranjeet Singh	574	1.74%	New
JD(U)	Haji Khaliq Sheikh	508	1.54%	New
Margin of victory		632	1.91%	▼14.72
Turnout		33,072	52.55%	▲11.67
Registered electors		62,942		▲25.19
JKNC gain from JD		Swing	▼9.20	

=== Assembly Election 1996 ===
1996 Jammu and Kashmir Legislative Assembly election : Rafiabad
Party	Candidate	Votes	%	±%
JD	Mohammad Dilawar Mir	9,084	44.20%	New
JKNC	Ghulam Mohammed Khan	5,666	27.57%	▼12.42
INC	Mohammed Yousaf Dar	1,796	8.74%	New
BJP	Mohammad Maqbool War	1,014	4.93%	New
Independent	Kartar Singh	855	4.16%	New
JKNPP	Gaini Sanant Singh	832	4.05%	New
Independent	Harbachan Singh	472	2.30%	New
Margin of victory		3,418	16.63%	▼0.53
Turnout		20,550	43.97%	▼34.06
Registered electors		50,276		▲21.70
JD gain from JKNC		Swing	▲4.22	

=== Assembly Election 1987 ===
1987 Jammu and Kashmir Legislative Assembly election : Rafiabad
Party	Candidate	Votes	%	±%
JKNC	Ghulam Mohammed Khan	12,378	39.99%	▼9.88
Independent	Abdul Majid Bhat	7,066	22.83%	New
Independent	Mohammad Dilawar Mir	6,268	20.25%	New
JKNC	Shiekh Bashir Ali	4,630	14.96%	▼34.91
Independent	Habib Ulla Ahang	613	1.98%	New
Margin of victory		5,312	17.16%	▼17.34
Turnout		30,955	77.31%	▲3.27
Registered electors		41,312		▲13.78
JKNC hold		Swing	▼9.88	

=== Assembly Election 1983 ===
1983 Jammu and Kashmir Legislative Assembly election : Rafiabad
Party	Candidate	Votes	%	±%
JKNC	Mohammad Dilawar Mir	12,976	49.87%	▼18.65
JKNC	Sheikh Bashir Ali Vakil	4,000	15.37%	▼53.15
INC	Abdul Ghani Ganai	3,850	14.80%	▼1.60
JI	Abdul Majjid Bhat	2,785	10.70%	New
Independent	Mohammed Maqbool	1,276	4.90%	New
Independent	Ghulam Ahmed	772	2.97%	New
Independent	Ghulam Rasool Bhat	361	1.39%	New
Margin of victory		8,976	34.50%	▼17.63
Turnout		26,020	76.88%	▲2.91
Registered electors		36,308		▲16.40
JKNC hold		Swing	▼18.65	

=== Assembly Election 1977 ===
1977 Jammu and Kashmir Legislative Assembly election : Rafiabad
Party	Candidate	Votes	%	±%
JKNC	Mohammad Dilawar Mir	14,696	68.52%	New
INC	Ghulam Rasool Kar	3,517	16.40%	▼45.22
JP	Ghulam Mustafa	2,881	13.43%	New
Independent	Abdul Ahad Sheikh	353	1.65%	New
Margin of victory		11,179	52.12%	▲28.88
Turnout		21,447	72.21%	▲4.09
Registered electors		31,192		▼4.17
JKNC gain from INC		Swing	▲6.90	

=== Assembly Election 1972 ===
1972 Jammu and Kashmir Legislative Assembly election : Rafiabad
Party	Candidate	Votes	%	±%
INC	Mohammed Yosuf Dar	12,971	61.62%	▲3.77
Independent	Abdul Ahmad Mir	8,079	38.38%	New
Margin of victory		4,892	23.24%	▲7.53
Turnout		21,050	66.45%	▲7.77
Registered electors		32,550		▲19.71
INC hold		Swing	▲3.77	

=== Assembly Election 1967 ===
1967 Jammu and Kashmir Legislative Assembly election : Rafiabad
Party	Candidate	Votes	%	±%
INC	Ghulam Rasool Kar	8,951	57.85%	New
JKNC	J. Singh	6,521	42.15%	New
Margin of victory		2,430	15.71%	
Turnout		15,472	59.06%	▲56.90
Registered electors		27,190		▲2.75
INC gain from JKNC		Swing		

=== Assembly Election 1962 ===
1962 Jammu and Kashmir Legislative Assembly election : Rafiabad
Party	Candidate	Votes	%	±%
JKNC	Ghulam Rasool Kar	Unopposed		
Registered electors		26,461		
JKNC win (new seat)				

== See also ==
- Rafiabad, India
- List of constituencies of Jammu and Kashmir Legislative Assembly
