= Javid Ahmad Dar =

Indian politician

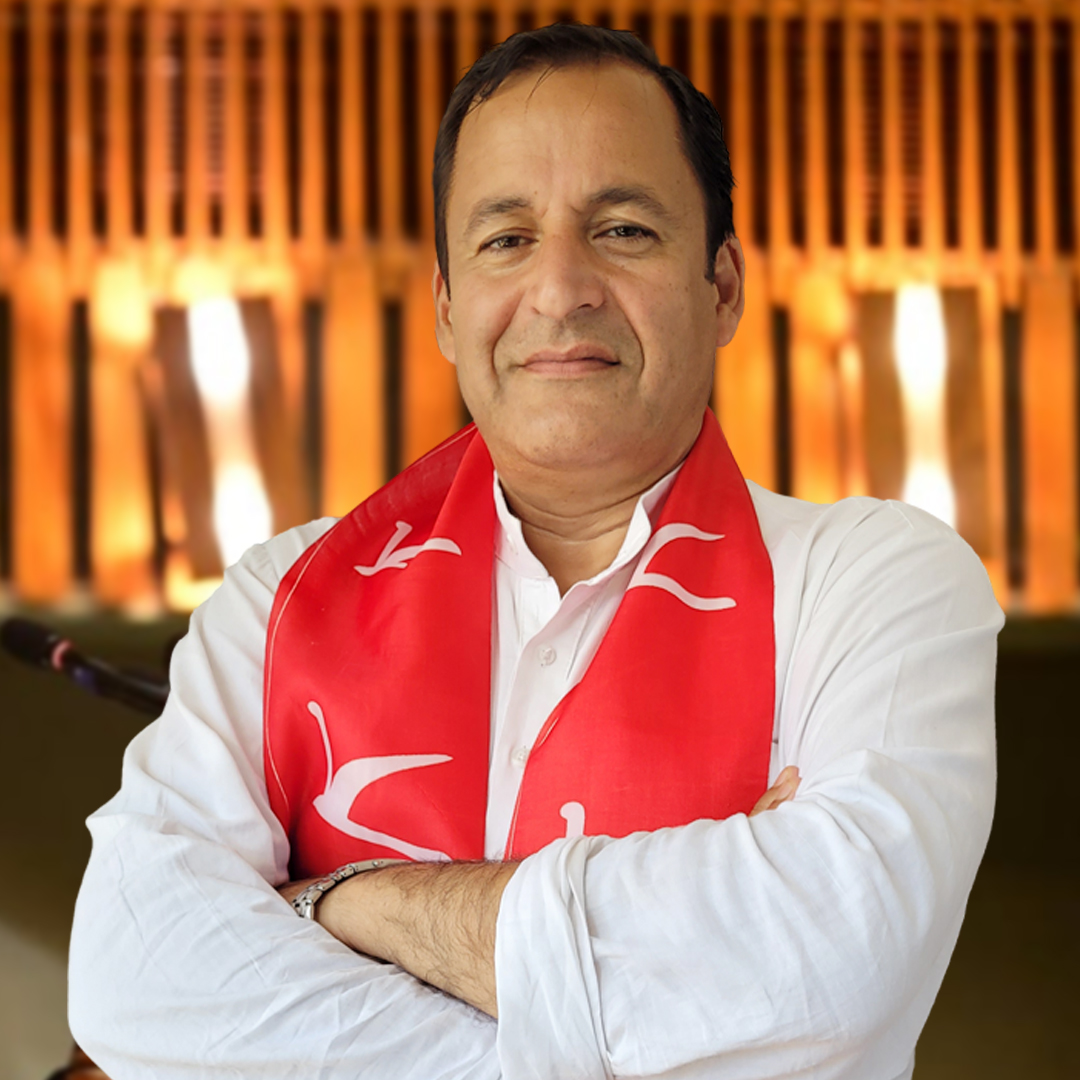

Cabinet Minister, Government of Jammu and Kashmir
- Incumbent
- Assumed office 16 October 2024
- Lieutenant Governor: Manoj Sinha
- Chief Minister: Omar Abdullah
- Ministry and Departments: Agriculture Production, Rural Development; Panchayati Raj; Cooperative; Election

Member of Jammu and Kashmir Legislative Assembly
- Incumbent
- Assumed office 8 October 2024
- Preceded by: Yawar Ahmad Mir
- Constituency: Rafiabad

Personal details
- Party: Jammu and Kashmir National Conference
- Profession: Politician

Javid Ahmad Dar is an Indian politician from Jammu and Kashmir. He is a member of the Jammu and Kashmir Legislative Assembly from 2024, representing Rafiabad Assembly constituency as member of the Jammu & Kashmir National Conference party.

On 16 October 2024, Dar was sworn in as the cabinet minister in the newly formed Government of Jammu and Kashmir. On 18 October 2024, following an order issued by Lieutenant Governor Sinha to allocate portfolios to council of ministers on the advice of chief minister, Dar was given the charge of Agriculture Production, Rural Development & Panchayati Raj, Cooperative, and Election.

== Personal life ==
Dar was born in Ladoora, a village in the Rafiabad region of Jammu and Kashmir. He is married and resides with his family in Ladoora.

== Educational background ==
After passing his Class 12th examination, Dar moved to Pune to pursue higher education at Pune University, where he completed his Bachelor's in Commerce in 1997. The following year, he enrolled for a Master's in Business Administration (MBA) program. However, after completing two semesters, he had to return home due to the sudden death of his father in 1998.

== Political career ==
Dar's political career began in 2002 after the death of his father, Muhammad Yousuf Dar, a veteran politician and close associate of Mufti Mohammad Sayeed. Initially, Javid joined the People's Democratic Party (PDP) and contested his first assembly election the same year, though he did not win. After spending six years with the PDP, he made a strategic shift to the Jammu & Kashmir National Conference in 2008. Supported by Farooq Abdullah, he contested and won the Rafiabad assembly seat, defeating his PDP opponent, Dilawar Mir. Following this victory, Dar was appointed Minister of State, overseeing the Roads and Buildings (R&B) Department. Although he lost his seat in the 2014 elections amid a strong PDP wave, he made a remarkable comeback in 2024, securing the Rafiabad constituency with a significant margin of 9202 votes. His return to the assembly was marked by his swearing-in as a cabinet minister for Agriculture Production, Rural Development & Panchayati Raj, Cooperative, and Election at the Sher-e-Kashmir International Convention Centre (SKICC) in Srinagar.

== See also ==
- 2024 Jammu and Kashmir Legislative Assembly election
- Jammu and Kashmir Legislative Assembly
- Jammu and Kashmir National Conference
- Rafiabad
