= Chakloo =

Village in Jammu and Kashmir, India

- Village
- Interactive map of Chakloo
- Coordinates: 34°14′26″N 74°22′59″E
- Country: India
- Union territory: Jammu and Kashmir
- District: Baramulla District

Chakloo, also known as Chakla, is a village on the bank of the Jhelum River, in the Baramulla District of Jammu and Kashmir, India.

== Geography ==
It is located 7 km from Baramulla. Two bridges connect the village with Kanispora via Ladoora, and Kawaja Bagh via Jambazpora respectively. Its Block is Nadihal and its Constituency is Rafiabad. Eight mohalas are found in the village: Sadeeque colony, Alnoor colony, Usmaan Abaad, Eidgah colony, Gazi Mohalla, Sofi Mohalla, Dar Mohalla, and Peer Mohalla. Recently the village was given a new administrative unit (Nayabat).

== Education ==
The village offers a high school (Government Boys High School Chakloo), middle schools (Government Girls Middle School Chakloo, Sheikh-Ul-Aalam Model Public School Chakloo, Green Hills Model Public School Chakloo, Hanfia Model School Chakloo, and a primary school (Government Primary School Gazi Mihalla Chakloo Baramulla). The literacy rate is 75% in males and 55% in females, and overall literacy rate is 65%.

== Demographics ==
The village has a population of approximately 20,000 to 30,000 people and is headed by a panchayat committee.

== Economy ==
The economy depends on agriculture and fruit orchards, particularly apples.

== Culture ==
Six mosques are present: Jamia Masjid Gazi Mohalla, Masjid Bait-ul-Allah, Masjid Noor, Masjid Sadweeq, Masjid Taqwa, and Masjid Usman. Shrines of two imams are located in the village: Saatar Sahib and Peerzada Baba Aziz ullah Shab. The main languages are Kashmiri, Urdu and English, and the primary religion is Islam.
