= Syed Ahmed Aga =

Indian politician

- Portrait of Syed Ahmed Aga

Member of Parliament, Lok Sabha
- In office 1967–1970
- Constituency: Baramulla
- In office 1970–1977
- Constituency: Baramulla

Personal details
- Born: September 1910 Srinagar, Jammu and Kashmir
- Died: October 1984 (aged 74) Srinagar
- Party: Indian National Congress
- Spouse: Zamrud Ahmad
- Children: 4
- Education: Aligarh Muslim University

Syed Ahmed Aga (1910–1984) was an Indian politician and member of parliament who was elected during the fourth and fifth Lok Sabhas of India. He represented Baramulla parliamentary constituency from 1967 to 1970, and was then re-elected in May 1970. He was affiliated with the Indian National Congress political party.

== Life and background ==
Aga was born in 1910 in Srinagar.

Aga served in the Jammu and Kashmir Administrative Service until 1965, and later, he served as a member of the Jammu and Kashmir Public Service Commission from 1965 to 1967.

Prior to contesting general elections, he administered various offices in Jammu and Kashmir state and served as the director of the Food Department and a member-secretary for the Food Procurement and Distribution Committee.

He was the director of rural development and secretary to the Government of Jammu and Kashmir for the departments of health, education-works (PHE), Co-operatives and Home.

Aga was one of the members of the Permanent Mission of India to the United Nations at the 25th session in 1970. He was very honest and hard working. He improved health and education.

== Death ==
He died in 1984.
