= 1931 Kashmir agitation =

1931 Agitation in Kashmir

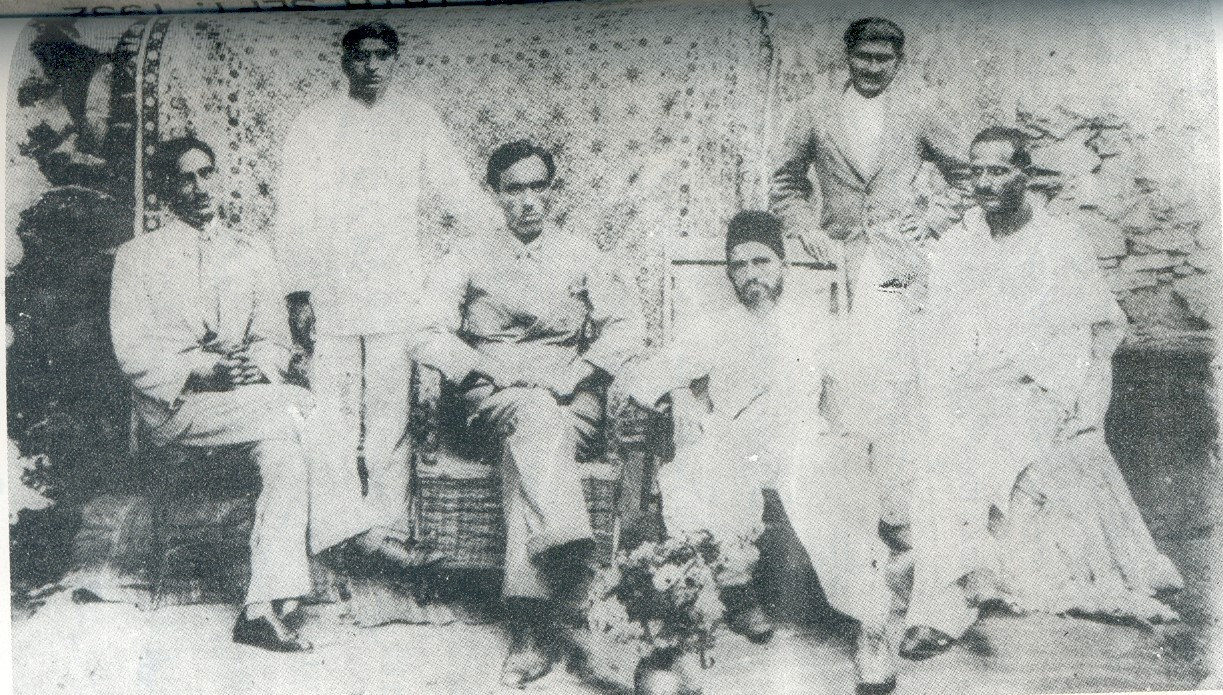
- (Seated, right to left): Sardar Gohar Rehman, Mistri Yaqoob Ali, Sheikh Abdullah and Chaudhary Ghulam Abbas. (Standing): Molvi Abdur Rahim (right) and Ghulam Nabi Gilkar.
- Date: 13 July 1931
- Location: Central Jail, Srinagar
- Type: Agitation
- Cause: Alleged desecration of the Koran by a Dogra policeman
- Outcome: 500 soldiers sent to support Hari Singh and restore law and order
- Deaths: 25 (including 22 Muslims killed in police firing and 3 Hindus killed in riots)

A widespread agitation throughout the princely state of Jammu and Kashmir in British Raj occurred in 1931 against the Maharaja's government. The Maharaja was forced to appoint the Glancy Commission to investigate the people's concerns. Various political reforms were adopted including the introduction of the Jammu and Kashmir Praja Sabha (legislative assembly). The movement also saw the rise of Sheikh Muhammad Abdullah as the leader of Kashmiris. The movement was funded by some well-to-do Muslim Zaildars and business houses.

== Events ==
On 13 July 1931, thousands of Kashmiris flocked to the central jail in Srinagar to see the trial of Abdul Qadeer. As the time for obligatory Zuhr prayer approached, a Kashmiri stood up to deliver the adhan. The Dogra governor, Raizada Tartilok Chand, ordered his soldiers to open fire on them, killing 22 Kashmiris. The people carried the dead through the streets of Maharajganj, Srinagar, chanting slogans opposing Dogra brutality. The incident shook the state, and a week-long period of mourning was observed. Traffic between Srinagar, Rawalpindi and Jammu was halted from 13 to 26 July. Some Hindu shopkeepers jeered the mourners which enraged violence and opportunists looted shops, protests intensified. Anti-Hindu riots began, leading to the death of three Hindus, the wounding of many more, and the looting of Hindu-owned shops.

The Hindus retaliated, leading to more clashes between the two groups. The violence spread to Kashmir province and Jammu; three British companies, numbering about 500 soldiers, were sent to support Maharaja Hari Singh and restore law and order. The Government was not permitting any procession or funeral. The 22 Muslims were buried in Mazar-e-Shohada, Srinagar. After few days a bridge called Sangam Bridge was burned. A Committee of Enquiry was appointed with Sir Barjor Dalal, Chief Justice as chairman, two High Court Judges – one from both religions – and 4 Committee Members including two Hindu and two Muslims as nominated by respective communities. But for some reason, the Committee failed to submit any report. Hence, the Government decided to publish unilateral views on disturbance. The incident led to the rise of young Sheikh Abdullah, and his rivalry with the maharaja continued until 1947.

== Meeting with the Maharaja ==
Muslim representatives, including Mirwaiz Yusuf Shah, Mirwaiz Hamadani, Syed Hussain Shah Jalali, Saad-ud-din Shawl, Sheikh Abdullah, Ghulam Ahmad Ashai, Yaqub Ali, Munshi Shahab-ud-Din, and Chaudhry Ghulam Abbas addressed the maharajah on 15 August. They made a number of accusations against Hindus in general and the state administration and prime minister in particular, alleging that evidence given to the Riots Enquiry Committee was fabricated or suppressed. The maharaja refused to dismiss the prime minister, and rejected the Muslim leaders' allegations as "unfounded".

== Temporary truce ==
The Muslim leaders were dissatisfied, but they met with the prime minister on 26 August and signed an agreement to end the agitation.

== Aftermath ==
The agitation temporarily subsided, primarily because of the Kashmir Darbar's conciliatory attitude toward its subjects (permitting Ahrar-i-Islam, Mazhar Ali Azhar and two companions to visit Kashmir privately). With the intervention of Muslim sympathisers outside Kashmir, 13 July was observed as Kashmir Day in Kashmir and several parts of India. Demonstrations and meetings were held in sympathy with Kashmiri Muslims. The meetings adopted resolutions calling for freedom of religion, the restoration of mosques and Muslim shrines, compensation for dependents of those killed or injured, and an investigation of the conduct of civil and military officers during the agitation.
