= Khwaja Mubarak Shah =

Indian politician (born 1922)(died 1987)

Member of Parliament, Lok Sabha
- In office 1980–1983
- Preceded by: Abdul Ahad Vakil
- Succeeded by: Saifuddin Soz
- Constituency: Baramulla

Personal details
- Born: 1 August 1922 Baramulla, Kashmir, India
- Died: 1987 AIIMS Cohert Study, New Delhi, India
- Party: Jammu and Kashmir National Conference
- Relations: Zaina Begum (Sister) Ghulam Ahmad Ashai (brother-in-law) Mohammad Aslam Shah & Mohammad Sadiq Shah (Nephews)

Khwaja Mubarak Shah was a senior Jammu & Kashmir National Conference leader and former Member of The Indian Parliament (MP) from the North Kashmir constituency of Baramulla in the early 1980s and also served as a Deputy Minister in the 1952 Government of Prime Minister Sheikh Mohammad Abdullah. He also served as Superintendent of Police from 1947 for a brief spell and was trained under Gen. Thimaih, and had given up the job to join politics after Sheikh Mohammed Abdullah was made as an interim Administrator to govern the State when its Dogra ruler Maharaja Hari Singh was dethroned in 1947. He was jailed along with Sheikh Mohammad Abdullah and remained in Jail from August 1953 to February 1963, when his father had died. Mubarak Shah polled an overwhelming 67.57% of votes in the Parliamentary Elections in 1980 as opposed to his closest opponent, Muzaffar Hussain Beg who polled 28.48% of total votes polled. He is the son of Khwaja Sikander Shah of Varmul and the Brother-in-Law of Ghulam Ahmad Ashai. He was succeeded as the MP from Baramulla by Saifuddin Soz, who went on to serve as the Union Minister for Water Resources in the first Manmohan Singh Administration.

Mubarak Shah was one of Sheikh Mohammad Abdullah's "premier lieutenants", as stated by Wajahat Habibullah in his book, "My Kashmir: Conflict and the Prospects for Enduring Peace". Mubarak Shah also served as a senior Cabinet Minister in Syed Mir Qasim's Government in Jammu & Kashmir, being placed in charge of a host of vital departments i.e. health and medical education, agriculture, forest, revenue, rural development, housing and horticulture. He contested Legislative Assembly elections from Baramulla and Tangmarg. He led the Indian delegation to International Health Conference held at Colombo, Sri Lanka in 1974. He served as India's Ambassador to Sudan and Tchad(Chad) from June 1976 to September 1978 and on return from the assignment was elected as Member Parliament Rajya Sabha from 11 November 1978 to 10 January 1980, whereafter he contested Lok Sabha election and got elected from Baramulla Parliamentary constituency. Mubarak Shah, a lawyer by profession, represented Sheikh Mohammad Abdullah in the infamous Kashmir Conspiracy Case as the lead defense lawyer and also accompanied Sheikh Abdullah on his high-profile visit to Pakistan on 24 May 1964 along with Mirza Afzal Beg and Maulana Masoodi. He served as Indian ambassador to Sudan and Tchad from 1976 to 1978.
