= Assad Ullah Shah =

Indian politician

Member Jammu and Kashmir Legislative Assembly
- In office 1977–1983
- Chief Minister: Sheikh Abdullah; Farooq Abdullah
- Constituency: Kupwara

Personal details
- Born: Kupwara Jammu and Kashmir (princely state)
- Died: 2004 Kupwara Jammu and Kashmir
- Party: Jammu & Kashmir National Conference
- Spouse: Bakhtawar Begum

Assad Ullah Shah was the MLA from Kupwara constituency of Jammu and Kashmir from 1977 to 1983 and President of the National Conference of Kupwara and President of Muslim Conference of Kupwara for period of more than 30 years. He was also a member of the Quit Kashmir Movement and close to Sheikh Abdullah. Assad Ullah Shah started his political career with the Quit Kashmir Movement. He was jailed for five years. In 1977, he was elected to Member of Jammu and Kashmir Legislative Assembly.

== Political activism ==
Assad Ullah Shah started his political career with the Quit Kashmir Movement. He was jailed for five years. In 1977, he was elected to Member of Jammu and Kashmir Legislative Assembly.

He was also the chairman of Awqab jamia masjid management for period of 11 years from 1984 to 1994 and also constructed the jamia masjid kupwara town.

== District status to kupwara ==
Under his leader ship kupwar became district
