= Kashmir Raj Bodhi Mahasabha =

The Kashmir-Raj Bodhi Mahasabha (KRMBS) was an organisation founded by Kashmiri neo-Buddhists (Navayana) in 1931. Co-founded by activist Shridhar Kaul, KRMBS was active in "modernization and reform" efforts, such as campaigning against polyandrous marriage practices, as well as representing the interests of the Buddhist community in Ladakh as well as Kashmiri Buddhists in general, although its founding members were not Ladakhi. Most of the members were recently converted Kashmiri Pandits who formed the organization to assert the establishment of and address the issues faced by the community. One reason for the foundation of was the lack of Buddhist representation in the Glancy Commission.
