= A. M. Tariq =

Indian politician

A M Tariq (22 June 1923 – 23 January 1980) was a politician from the Indian State of Jammu and Kashmir and member of INC. He was one of the youngest politician from Kashmir and was the son of Sheikh Ghulam Qadir. He was member of 2nd Lok Sabha during 1957 to 1962. He also became member of Rajya Sabha from Jammu and Kashmir State during 1962-1965 and later during 1967-1968. He had 3 sons and 5 daughters. He later become the chairman of Indian Motion Pictures Export Corporation.
