= Trehgam Assembly constituency =

Constituency of the Jammu and Kashmir legislative assembly in India

Trehgam
- Constituency for the Jammu and Kashmir Legislative Assembly

Constituency details
- Country: India
- State: Jammu and Kashmir
- District: Kupwara
- Lok Sabha constituency: Baramulla
- Established: 2022

Member of Legislative Assembly
- Incumbent Saifullah Mir
- Party: Jammu and Kashmir National Conference
- Elected year: 2024

Trehgam is one of the 90 constituencies in the Jammu and Kashmir Legislative Assembly of Jammu and Kashmir a north state of India. Trehgam is also part of Baramulla Lok Sabha constituency.

== Members of the Legislative Assembly ==
Election	Member	Party
2024	Saifullah Mir	Jammu and Kashmir National Conference

== Election results ==
=== Assembly Election 2024 ===
2024 Jammu and Kashmir Legislative Assembly election : Trehgam
Party	Candidate	Votes	%	±%
JKNC	Saifullah Mir	18,002	33.74%	New
JKPC	Bashir Ahmad Dar	14,376	26.95%	New
Independent	Nazir Ahmad Mir	8,216	15.40%	New
JKAP	Dr Noor Ud Din Ahmad Shah	3,828	7.18%	New
JKPDP	Mohammad Afzal Wani	3,495	6.55%	New
Independent	Javid Ahmad Mir	2,386	4.47%	New
Independent	Kaysar Ahmad Mir	1,129	2.12%	New
NOTA	None of the Above	920	1.72%	New
Margin of victory		3,626	6.80%	
Turnout		53,348	67.90%	
Registered electors		78,569		
JKNC win (new seat)				

== See also ==
- List of constituencies of the Jammu and Kashmir Legislative Assembly
