= Fayaz Ahmad Mir =

Indian politician

Member of the Jammu and Kashmir Legislative Assembly
- Incumbent
- Assumed office 2024
- Preceded by: Bashir Ahmad Dar
- Constituency: Kupwara

Member of Parliament, Rajya Sabha
- In office 11 February 2015 – 9 February 2021
- Succeeded by: Sajjad Ahmad Kichloo
- Constituency: Jammu and Kashmir

Personal details
- Born: Kupwara
- Party: Jammu and Kashmir People's Democratic Party
- Other political affiliations: Jammu and Kashmir People's Conference
- Profession: Politician

Fayaz Ahmad Mir (sometimes Mir Mohammad Fayaz) is an Indian politician and a member of legislative assembly from Kupwara Assembly constituency, He is a former Member of Parliament of the Rajya Sabha. As of 2024, he is a member of the Jammu and Kashmir Legislative Assembly representing the Kupwara Assembly constituency.

== Electoral performance ==
Election	Constituency	Party	Result	Votes %	Opposition Candidate	Opposition Party	Opposition vote %	Ref
2024	Kupwara	JKPDP	Won	44.76%	Nasir Aslam Wani	JKNC	28.97%	
2014	Kupwara	JKPDP	Lost	34.26%	Bashir Ahmad Dar	JKPC	34.47%	
2008	Kupwara	JKPDP	Lost	20.74%	Saifullah Mir	JKNC	30.07%	
