= Uri Assembly constituency =

Constituency of the Jammu and Kashmir legislative assembly in India

Coordinates: 34.09°N 74.03°E

Uri
- Constituency No. 9 for the Jammu and Kashmir Legislative Assembly

Constituency details
- Country: India
- State: Jammu and Kashmir
- District: Baramulla
- Lok Sabha constituency: Baramulla
- Established: 1962

Member of Legislative Assembly
- Incumbent Sajjad Shafi
- Party: Jammu and Kashmir National Conference
- Elected year: 2024

Uri Assembly constituency is one of the 90 constituencies in the Jammu and Kashmir Legislative Assembly of Jammu and Kashmir a north state of India. Uri is also part of Baramulla Lok Sabha constituency.

== Member of Legislative Assembly ==
| Election | Member | Party |
|---|---|---|
| 1962 | Mohammed Afzal Khan Raja | Jammu & Kashmir National Conference |
| 1967 | M. M. Khan | Indian National Congress |
| 1972 | Mohammad Shafi | Independent politician |
| 1977 | Mohammad Shafi | Jammu & Kashmir National Conference |
| 1983 | Mohammad Shafi | Jammu & Kashmir National Conference |
| 1987 | Mohammad Shafi | Jammu & Kashmir National Conference |
| 1996 | Mohammad Shafi | Jammu & Kashmir National Conference |
| 2002 | Taj Mohiuddin | Indian National Congress |
| 2008 | Taj Mohiuddin | Indian National Congress |
| 2014 | Mohammad Shafi | Jammu & Kashmir National Conference |
| 2024 | Sajjad Shafi | Jammu and Kashmir National Conference |

== Election results ==
=== Assembly Election 2024 ===
2024 Jammu and Kashmir Legislative Assembly election : Uri
| Party | Candidate | Votes | % | ±% |
|---|---|---|---|---|
| JKNC | Sajjad Shafi | 39,713 | 53.73% | ▲14.48 |
| Independent | Taj Mohiuddin | 25,244 | 34.16% | New |
| Independent | Munir Ahmad | 3,316 | 4.49% | New |
| JKPC | Dr. Bashir Ahmad Chalkoo | 1,792 | 2.42% | New |
| NOTA | None of the Above | 1,520 | 2.06% | ▲0.88 |
| JKPDP | Sheikh Muneeb | 1,382 | 1.87% | ▼28.05 |
| Independent | Sajad Subhan Rather | 941 | 1.27% | New |
| Margin of victory | | 14,469 | 19.58% | ▲10.24 |
| Turnout | | 73,908 | 70.55% | ▼12.30 |
| Registered electors | | 1,04,761 | | ▲39.85 |
| JKNC hold | | Swing | ▲14.48 | |

=== Assembly Election 2014 ===
2014 Jammu and Kashmir Legislative Assembly election : Uri
| Party | Candidate | Votes | % | ±% |
|---|---|---|---|---|
| JKNC | Mohammad Shafi | 24,359 | 39.25% | ▼1.81 |
| JKPDP | Aijaz Ali Khan | 18,567 | 29.92% | ▲27.05 |
| INC | Taj Mohiuddin | 16,588 | 26.73% | ▼17.81 |
| BJP | Mushtaq Ahmad Mir | 1,269 | 2.04% | ▲0.83 |
| NOTA | None of the Above | 729 | 1.17% | New |
| All J & K Kisan Majdoor Party | Waseem Raja | 549 | 0.88% | New |
| Margin of victory | | 5,792 | 9.33% | ▲5.85 |
| Turnout | | 62,061 | 82.85% | ▲1.12 |
| Registered electors | | 74,909 | | ▲13.45 |
| JKNC gain from INC | | Swing | ▼5.29 | |

=== Assembly Election 2008 ===
2008 Jammu and Kashmir Legislative Assembly election : Uri
| Party | Candidate | Votes | % | ±% |
|---|---|---|---|---|
| INC | Taj Mohiuddin | 24,036 | 44.54% | ▼3.97 |
| JKNC | Mohammad Shafi | 22,157 | 41.06% | ▼7.02 |
| JKPDP | Shabir Ahmad Mangral | 1,550 | 2.87% | New |
| Independent | Mohammad Mushab Khan | 1,177 | 2.18% | New |
| JKANC | Syed Showkat Hussain | 1,033 | 1.91% | New |
| BSP | Sajid Naseer Khan | 1,020 | 1.89% | New |
| AIFB | Noor-Ul-Amin Malik | 874 | 1.62% | New |
| BJP | Halima Bano | 655 | 1.21% | ▼2.20 |
| Independent | Mohammad Altaf Mir | 545 | 1.01% | New |
| Margin of victory | | 1,879 | 3.48% | ▲3.05 |
| Turnout | | 53,964 | 81.73% | ▲15.24 |
| Registered electors | | 66,028 | | ▲4.10 |
| INC hold | | Swing | ▼3.97 | |

=== Assembly Election 2002 ===
2002 Jammu and Kashmir Legislative Assembly election : Uri
| Party | Candidate | Votes | % | ±% |
|---|---|---|---|---|
| INC | Taj Mohiuddin | 20,460 | 48.51% | ▲19.68 |
| JKNC | Mohammad Shafi | 20,276 | 48.08% | ▼5.60 |
| BJP | Mohammad Akber | 1,438 | 3.41% | New |
| Margin of victory | | 184 | 0.44% | ▼24.41 |
| Turnout | | 42,174 | 66.49% | ▼2.52 |
| Registered electors | | 63,429 | | ▲29.68 |
| INC gain from JKNC | | Swing | | |

=== Assembly Election 1996 ===
1996 Jammu and Kashmir Legislative Assembly election : Uri
| Party | Candidate | Votes | % | ±% |
|---|---|---|---|---|
| JKNC | Mohammad Shafi | 18,117 | 53.67% | ▼35.93 |
| INC | Taj Mohiuddin | 9,731 | 28.83% | New |
| Independent | Syed Anayat Shah | 2,604 | 7.71% | New |
| Independent | Mushtaq Ahmad | 2,222 | 6.58% | New |
| Independent | Mushtaq Ahmad Tantry | 1,080 | 3.20% | New |
| Margin of victory | | 8,386 | 24.84% | ▼56.49 |
| Turnout | | 33,754 | 70.69% | ▼13.60 |
| Registered electors | | 48,912 | | ▲30.28 |
| JKNC hold | | Swing | ▼35.93 | |

=== Assembly Election 1987 ===
1987 Jammu and Kashmir Legislative Assembly election : Uri
| Party | Candidate | Votes | % | ±% |
|---|---|---|---|---|
| JKNC | Mohammad Shafi | 27,793 | 89.61% | ▲22.87 |
| Independent | Abdul Rehman | 2,565 | 8.27% | New |
| Independent | Mohammed Hanif | 658 | 2.12% | New |
| Margin of victory | | 25,228 | 81.34% | ▲47.87 |
| Turnout | | 31,016 | 83.42% | ▲7.11 |
| Registered electors | | 37,545 | | ▲18.67 |
| JKNC hold | | Swing | | |

=== Assembly Election 1983 ===
1983 Jammu and Kashmir Legislative Assembly election : Uri
| Party | Candidate | Votes | % | ±% |
|---|---|---|---|---|
| JKNC | Mohammad Shafi | 15,940 | 66.73% | ▲1.18 |
| Independent | Qazi Mohammad | 7,946 | 33.27% | New |
| Margin of victory | | 7,994 | 33.47% | ▼13.89 |
| Turnout | | 23,886 | 78.08% | ▲9.16 |
| Registered electors | | 31,639 | | ▲15.42 |
| JKNC hold | | Swing | | |

=== Assembly Election 1977 ===
1977 Jammu and Kashmir Legislative Assembly election : Uri
| Party | Candidate | Votes | % | ±% |
|---|---|---|---|---|
| JKNC | Mohammad Shafi | 11,921 | 65.56% | New |
| INC | Mohammed Mazaffar Khan | 3,309 | 18.20% | ▼14.12 |
| JP | Ghulam Mohiuddin Wani | 2,695 | 14.82% | New |
| Independent | Abdul Aziz Khan | 259 | 1.42% | New |
| Margin of victory | | 8,612 | 47.36% | ▲16.95 |
| Turnout | | 18,184 | 68.17% | ▲3.63 |
| Registered electors | | 27,412 | | ▲13.00 |
| JKNC gain from Independent | | Swing | ▲2.83 | |

=== Assembly Election 1972 ===
1972 Jammu and Kashmir Legislative Assembly election : Uri
| Party | Candidate | Votes | % | ±% |
|---|---|---|---|---|
| Independent | Mohammad Shafi | 9,543 | 62.73% | New |
| INC | Mohammed Mazaffar Khan | 4,916 | 32.31% | New |
| Independent | Raja Mohammed Afzal Khan | 754 | 4.96% | New |
| Margin of victory | | 4,627 | 30.41% | |
| Turnout | | 15,213 | 62.78% | ▲62.71 |
| Registered electors | | 24,259 | | ▲5.16 |
| Independent gain from INC | | Swing | | |

=== Assembly Election 1967 ===
1967 Jammu and Kashmir Legislative Assembly election : Uri
| Party | Candidate | Votes | % | ±% |
|---|---|---|---|---|
| INC | M. M. Khan | Unopposed | | |
| Registered electors | | 23,068 | | ▲11.50 |
| INC gain from JKNC | | Swing | | |

=== Assembly Election 1962 ===
1962 Jammu and Kashmir Legislative Assembly election : Uri
| Party | Candidate | Votes | % | ±% |
|---|---|---|---|---|
| JKNC | Mohammed Afzal Khan Raja | Unopposed | | |
| Registered electors | | 20,689 | | |
| JKNC win (new seat) | | | | |

== See also ==
- Uri, Jammu and Kashmir
- Baramulla district
- List of constituencies of Jammu and Kashmir Legislative Assembly
