= Taj Mohiuddin =

Indian politician

Treasurer of the Democratic Azad Party
- In office 2022–2025
- Preceded by: Post-Established

Member of Jammu and Kashmir Legislative Assembly
- In office 2014–2022
- Constituency: Uri

Personal details
- Born: 1945 (age 80–81)
- Party: Indian National Congress (until 2022, 2025 - present)
- Other political affiliations: Democratic Azad Party (2022 - 2025)

Taj Mohiuddin (born 1945, also Taj Mohi-ud-din) is a politician from Jammu and Kashmir and member of Democratic Azad Party. On 3 October 2022, Din was appointed as Treasurer for Democratic Azad Party. Din was the member of Jammu and Kashmir Legislative Assembly from Uri Assembly constituency during 2002-2008 and 2008-2014 as Indian National Congress candidate. He lost from the seat in 2024 as an independent candidate.

== Political career ==
Taj Mohiuddin joined Indian National Congress in 1986. Despite being a resident of Jammu region, Din started his political career from Uri.

Prior to Mohiuddin's victory over in 2002 from the constituency, Mohammad Shafi, a former National Conference leader, held the Assembly seat in Uri Assembly constituency for more than three decades. In the 2008 Assembly election, he won once more. Shafi regained the seat in 2014, although Mohiuddin had already established himself as a significant figure in the Congress by that point.

On 30 August 2022, he resigned from Congress in support of Ghulam Nabi Azad.

On 3 October 2022, Din was appointed as Treasurer for Democratic Azad Party.

He lost in 2024 from Uri Assembly constituency.
