= Shameema Dev Azad =

Kashmiri singer from Jammu and Kashmir

- Born: Shameema Dev; 25 May 1955 (age 71); Srinagar, Jammu and Kashmir, India
- Spouse: Ghulam Nabi Azad
- Children: Saddam Nabi Azad; Sofiya Nabi Azad
- Parent: Abdullah Dev (father)
- Awards: Padma Shri (2005); Kalpana Chawala Excellence Award (2007)

Shameema Dev Azad (also Shameem, born 25 May 1955) is a Kashmiri singer from Jammu and Kashmir. She is married to Ghulam Nabi Azad, former Chief Minister of Jammu and Kashmir.

== Awards ==
She is known for her melodious voice, she was honoured with India's fourth highest civilian award the Padma Shri by Government of India in 2005. She received Kalpana Chawla Excellence Award in 2007. She was also awarded by the Government of Jammu and Kashmir on the Republic Day of 2010 in the field of performing arts.

== Personal life ==
Shameema is one of the eight children of Muhammad Abdullah Dev. She has six brothers. She is married to Ghulam Nabi Azad since 1980.
