= Gurwinder Singh Oberoi =

Indian politician

Member of Parliament, Rajya Sabha
- Incumbent
- Assumed office 24 October 2025
- Preceded by: Ghulam Nabi Azad
- Constituency: Jammu and Kashmir

Personal details
- Born: Jammu and Kashmir, India
- Party: Jammu and Kashmir National Conference
- Occupation: Politician

Gurwinder Singh Oberoi is a politician from Jammu and Kashmir. He is a member of the Rajya Sabha for Jammu and Kashmir.
