= Yawar Ahmad Mir =

Indian politician (born 1987)

Yawar Ahmad Mir (born 1987) is an Indian politician from Jammu and Kashmir. He was an MLA from Rafiabad Assembly constituency in Baramulla district. He won the 2014 Jammu and Kashmir Legislative Assembly election representing the Jammu and Kashmir People's Democratic Party. He lost in 2024 contesting from Jammu and Kashmir Apni Party ticket.

== Early life and education ==
Mir is from Rafiabad, Baramulla district, Jammu and Kashmir. He is the son of Mohd. Dilawar Mir, a former five time MLA. He completed his L.L.M. in 2011 at University of Nottingham, United Kingdom.

== Career ==
Mir won from Rafiabad Assembly constituency representing Jammu and Kashmir People's Democratic Party in the 2014 Jammu and Kashmir Legislative Assembly election. He polled 17,918 votes and defeated his nearest rival, Abdul Ghani Vakil of the Indian National Congress, by a margin of 2,334 votes. In 2024 Jammu and Kashmir Legislative Assembly election he from contested on an Jammu and Kashmir Apni Party ticket from Rafiabad Assembly constituency, but lost to Javed Ahmed of JKNC by a margin of 9,202 votes.
