= Mohammad Shafi (politician) =

Indian politician

Member of Rajya Sabha
- In office 2009–2014
- Constituency: Jammu and Kashmir

Member of the Jammu and Kashmir Legislative Assembly
- In office 1972–2002
- Preceded by: M. M. Khan
- Succeeded by: Taj Mohi-U-Din
- Constituency: Uri
- In office 2014–2018
- Preceded by: Taj Mohi-U-Din
- Succeeded by: Sajjad Shafi
- Constituency: Uri

Member of Parliament (Rajya Sabha)
- In office 2009–2014
- Constituency: Jammu and Kashmir

Personal details
- Born: Mohammad Shafi; 16 December 1943 (age 82) Uri, Jammu and Kashmir
- Citizenship: Indian
- Party: National Conference
- Spouse: Hamida Begum
- Children: Sajjad Shafi & 6 other children
- Education: B.A., LL. B. University of Kashmir
- Occupation: Social Worker, Politician

Mohammad Shafi Uri is a former member of the Jammu and Kashmir Legislative Assembly. He represented the Uri Assembly Constituency and was a member of the Jammu & Kashmir National Conference.

He was elected to Jammu and Kashmir Legislative Assembly in 1972 and became the Minister of State for Education in 1977 but in 1987, he became Cabinet Minister for Information, Education and Social Welfare then Cabinet Minister for Agriculture, Rural Development, Cooperative & Panchayat Raj. He introduced Panchayati Raj system in Jammu and Kashmir.

He was made Cabinet Minister for Finance and Education. He was sent to Rajya Sabha from 2009 to 2015 but resigned in 2014 as he was reelected as a member of the Jammu and Kashmir Legislative Assembly from Uri in the 2014 election.

== Electoral performance ==
Election	Constituency	Party	Result	Votes %	Opposition Candidate	Opposition Party	Opposition vote %	Ref
2014	Uri	JKNC	Won	39.25%	Aijaz Ali Khan	JKPDP	29.92%	
2008	Uri	JKNC	Lost	41.06%	Taj Mohiuddin	INC	44.54%	
2002	Uri	JKNC	Lost	48.08%	Taj Mohiuddin	INC	48.51%	
1996	Uri	JKNC	Won	53.67%	Taj Mohiuddin	INC	28.83%	
1987	Uri	JKNC	Won	89.61%	Abdul Rehman	Independent	8.27%	
1983	Uri	JKNC	Won	66.73%	Qazi Mohammad	Independent	33.27%	
1977	Uri	JKNC	Won	65.56%	Mohammed Mazaffar Khan	INC	18.20%	
1972	Uri	Independent	Won	62.73%	Mohammed Mazaffar Khan	INC	32.31%	
