= Kupwara Assembly constituency =

Constituency of the Jammu and Kashmir legislative assembly in India

Coordinates: 34.53°N 74.25°E

Kupwara
- Constituency for the Jammu and Kashmir Legislative Assembly

Constituency details
- Country: India
- State: Jammu and Kashmir
- District: Kupwara
- Lok Sabha constituency: Baramulla
- Established: 1967

Member of Legislative Assembly
- Incumbent Mir Mohammad Fayaz
- Party: JKPDP
- Elected year: 2024

Kupwara Assembly constituency is one of the 90 constituencies in the Jammu and Kashmir Legislative Assembly of Jammu and Kashmir a north state of India. Kupwara is also part of Baramulla Lok Sabha constituency.

== Overview ==
Kupwara (constituency number 2) is one of the Vidhan Sabha constituencies located in Kupwara district. This constituency covers PCs 18-Sulakot, 20-Radabug, 22-Bumhama, 23-Drugmulla, 25-Gushi, 26-Batergam, 27-Dadikoot, 30-Gulgam, 31-Harrai, 32-Hayan, 33-Trehgam, 34-Guglose, 35-Kralpora, 36-Guzeryal, 37-Gundizona-Reshi. 38-Panzgam, 39-Meelyal, 40-Shooloora, 41-Dardihairi-Kharagund, 42-Kupwara, 43-Awoora, 44-Zirhama of Tehsil Kupwara and PC 55-Manzgam in Tehsil Handwara.

== Members of the Legislative Assembly ==
Election	Member	Party
1967	Mohammad Sultan Tantray	Indian National Congress
1972	Ghulam Mohammed Shah	Indian National Congress
1977	Assad Ullah Shah	Jammu & Kashmir National Conference
1983	Peer Abdul Gani	Jammu & Kashmir National Conference
1987	Mushtaq Ahmad Lone	Jammu & Kashmir National Conference
1996	Saifullah Mir	Jammu & Kashmir National Conference
2002	Saifullah Mir	Jammu & Kashmir National Conference
2008	Saifullah Mir	Jammu & Kashmir National Conference
2014	Bashir Ahmad Dar	Jammu and Kashmir People's Conference
2024	Fayaz Ahmad Mir	Jammu and Kashmir People's Democratic Party

== Election results ==
=== Assembly Election 2024 ===
2024 Jammu and Kashmir Legislative Assembly election : Kupwara
Party	Candidate	Votes	%	±%
JKPDP	Fayaz Ahmad Mir	27,773	44.76%	▲10.50
JKNC	Nasir Aslam Wani	17,976	28.97%	New
JKPC	Sajad Gani Lone	7,457	12.02%	▼22.45
Independent	Pirzada Firdous Ahmad	5,672	9.14%	New
SP	Sabiha Begum	591	0.95%	New
Independent	Ghulam Nabi Khan Pathan	575	0.93%	New
Bhim Sena	Bashir Ahmad Malik	410	0.66%	New
NOTA	None of the Above	1,383	2.23%	▲1.30
Margin of victory		9,797	15.79%	▲15.58
Turnout		62,055	65.35%	▼1.75
Registered electors		94,956		▼11.28
JKPDP gain from JKPC		Swing	▲10.29	

=== Assembly Election 2014 ===
2014 Jammu and Kashmir Legislative Assembly election : Kupwara
Party	Candidate	Votes	%	±%
JKPC	Bashir Ahmad Dar	24,754	34.47%	New
JKPDP	Fayaz Ahmad Mir	24,603	34.26%	▲13.52
JKNC	Saifullah Mir	17,390	24.21%	▼5.86
BJP	Abdul Rehman Lone	790	1.10%	New
JKNPP	Wali Mohammed Khan	672	0.94%	New
All J & K Kisan Majdoor Party	Ghulam Hassan Sheikh	598	0.83%	New
Independent	Mohammed Amin Peer	582	0.81%	New
NOTA	None of the Above	664	0.92%	New
Margin of victory		151	0.21%	▼9.12
Turnout		71,818	67.10%	▲4.67
Registered electors		1,07,033		▲20.34
JKPC gain from JKNC		Swing	▲4.40	

=== Assembly Election 2008 ===
2008 Jammu and Kashmir Legislative Assembly election : Kupwara
Party	Candidate	Votes	%	±%
JKNC	Saifullah Mir	16,696	30.07%	▼13.17
JKPDP	Fayaz Ahmad Mir	11,514	20.74%	New
Independent	Shabnam Gani Lone	11,050	19.90%	New
Independent	Abdul Majeed Khan	2,673	4.81%	New
People's Democratic Front (Jammu and Kashmir)	Abdul Ahad Mir	2,495	4.49%	New
Jammu & Kashmir Democratic Party Nationalist	Abdul Majeed Sheikh	2,237	4.03%	New
INC	Chowdhary Salam-U-Din	2,046	3.68%	▼1.00
Margin of victory		5,182	9.33%	▲9.04
Turnout		55,525	62.43%	▲7.19
Registered electors		88,942		▲10.44
JKNC hold		Swing	▼13.17	

=== Assembly Election 2002 ===
2002 Jammu and Kashmir Legislative Assembly election : Kupwara
Party	Candidate	Votes	%	±%
JKNC	Saifullah Mir	19,233	43.24%	▲5.33
Independent	Ghulam Qadir Mir	19,101	42.94%	New
INC	Chowdhary Salam-U-Din	2,085	4.69%	▼26.57
LJP	Mohammed Ashraf Lone	1,062	2.39%	New
JKAL	Nazir Ahmad Khan	994	2.23%	New
Independent	Ghulam Ahmad Mir	594	1.34%	New
Independent	Mohammed Asdullah Bhat	594	1.34%	New
Margin of victory		132	0.30%	▼6.35
Turnout		44,483	55.23%	▲31.44
Registered electors		80,536		▲25.94
JKNC hold		Swing	▲5.33	

=== Assembly Election 1996 ===
1996 Jammu and Kashmir Legislative Assembly election : Kupwara
Party	Candidate	Votes	%	±%
JKNC	Saifullah Mir	5,766	37.90%	▲0.84
INC	Chowdhary Salam-U-Din	4,755	31.26%	New
Independent	Ghulam Mohi-Ud-Din	1,301	8.55%	New
JD	Assadullah Bhat	1,045	6.87%	New
Independent	Din Mohammed Chichi	989	6.50%	New
Independent	M. Y. Beigh	719	4.73%	New
JKNPP	Ghulam Rasool Shah	637	4.19%	New
Margin of victory		1,011	6.65%	▲1.41
Turnout		15,212	25.97%	▼43.10
Registered electors		63,946		▲25.97
JKNC hold		Swing	▲0.84	

=== Assembly Election 1987 ===
1987 Jammu and Kashmir Legislative Assembly election : Kupwara
Party	Candidate	Votes	%	±%
JKNC	Mushtaq Ahmad Lone	12,585	37.06%	▼11.21
JKNC	Abdul Haq Khan	10,806	31.83%	▼16.45
Independent	Mohammed Ashraf Sehrai	8,959	26.39%	New
Independent	Zahur Ahmed Wani	1,189	3.50%	New
Independent	Abdul Jabbr Hajam	415	1.22%	New
Margin of victory		1,779	5.24%	▼20.79
Turnout		33,954	69.44%	▲6.86
Registered electors		50,762		▲12.13
JKNC hold		Swing	▼11.21	

=== Assembly Election 1983 ===
1983 Jammu and Kashmir Legislative Assembly election : Kupwara
Party	Candidate	Votes	%	±%
JKNC	Peer Abdul Gani	13,119	48.27%	▼8.13
JKNC	Abdul Haq	6,046	22.25%	▼34.16
JI	Mohammed Ashraf Khan	3,717	13.68%	▲2.58
Independent	Abdul Hamid Ganai	2,061	7.58%	New
INC	Ghulam Nabi Shah	1,821	6.70%	▼0.03
Independent	Qamar-U-Din	217	0.80%	New
Independent	Abdul Jabbar	195	0.72%	New
Margin of victory		7,073	26.03%	▼10.59
Turnout		27,176	64.57%	▼0.55
Registered electors		45,271		▲12.27
JKNC hold		Swing	▼8.13	

=== Assembly Election 1977 ===
1977 Jammu and Kashmir Legislative Assembly election : Kupwara
Party	Candidate	Votes	%	±%
JKNC	Assad Ullah Shah	13,780	56.41%	New
JP	Ghulam Nabi	4,834	19.79%	New
JI	Ashraf Sahrai	2,711	11.10%	New
INC	Safiullah Butt	1,644	6.73%	▼68.06
Independent	Wafadar Khan	1,320	5.40%	New
Margin of victory		8,946	36.62%	▼22.31
Turnout		24,430	62.70%	▲0.82
Registered electors		40,324		▲64.03
JKNC gain from INC		Swing	▼18.39	

=== Assembly Election 1972 ===
1972 Jammu and Kashmir Legislative Assembly election : Kupwara
Party	Candidate	Votes	%	±%
INC	Ghulam Mohammed Shah	10,988	74.79%	New
Independent	Mohammad Sultan Tantray	2,331	15.87%	New
Independent	Sh. Ahmad Dar	1,130	7.69%	New
Independent	Abdul Aziz Khan	242	1.65%	New
Margin of victory		8,657	58.93%	
Turnout		14,691	60.74%	▲59.76
Registered electors		24,583		▲4.27
INC hold		Swing		

=== Assembly Election 1967 ===
1967 Jammu and Kashmir Legislative Assembly election : Kupwara
Party	Candidate	Votes	%	±%
INC	Mohammad Sultan Tantray	Unopposed		
Registered electors		23,576		
INC win (new seat)				

== See also ==
- Kupwara
- Kupwara district
- List of constituencies of Jammu and Kashmir Legislative Assembly
