= Sajjad Shafi =

Indian politician

Member of Jammu and Kashmir Legislative Assembly
- Incumbent
- Assumed office 8 October 2024
- Preceded by: Mohammad Shafi Uri
- Constituency: Uri Assembly constituency

Personal details
- Political party: Jammu & Kashmir National Conference
- Profession: Politician

Sajjad Shafi is an Indian politician from Jammu and Kashmir. He has been a member of the Jammu and Kashmir Legislative Assembly since 2024, representing the Uri Assembly constituency as a Member of the Jammu & Kashmir National Conference party.

He is the son of former Minister and Rajya Sabha Member Mohammad Shafi Uri.

== Electoral performance ==
| Election | Constituency | Party | Result | Votes % | Opposition Candidate | Opposition Party | Opposition vote % | Ref |
|---|---|---|---|---|---|---|---|---|
| 2024 | Uri | JKNC | Won | 53.73% | Taj Mohiuddin | Independent | 34.16% | |

== See also ==
- 2024 Jammu and Kashmir Legislative Assembly election
- Jammu and Kashmir Legislative Assembly
