= Tirath Ram Amla =

Indian politician

Tirath Ram Amla (1913-2009) was an Indian politician from Jammu and Kashmir. He was born on 13 April 1913 in Muzaffarabad, Jammu and Kashmir (British India).

== Political career ==
He was elected to Upper House of India Parliament - the Rajya Sabha for four term 1967–1970, 1970–1976, 1976–1982 and 1985–1991 from Indian National Congress Party. Amla was arguably the most successful businessmen from the Kashmir Valley. Among other things, he set up Hotel Broadway and Broadway Cinema (which later burnt down) in Srinagar. He also built the iconic Hotel Broadway, Old Delhi in 1956. Today, it is managed by his grandson, prominent restaurateur Rohit Khattar's Old World Hospitality (OWH).

Amla married Satyadevi in 1939. They had 3 children - Krishan, Vijay Lakshmi and Kiran. Kiran married Vijay Dhar, son of the stalwart Kashmiri politician DP Dhar. Amla died in New Delhi on 22 January 2009 of a stroke.

== Rajya Sabha Election History ==
Position	Party	Constituency	From	To	Tenure
Member of Parliament, Rajya Sabha (1st Term)	INC	Jammu and Kashmir	4 May 1967	2 April 1970	2 years, 333 days
Member of Parliament, Rajya Sabha (2nd Term)	INC	Jammu and Kashmir	3 April 1970	2 April 1976	5 years, 365 days
Member of Parliament, Rajya Sabha (3rd Term)	INC	Jammu and Kashmir	3 April 1976	2 April 1982	5 years, 364 days
Member of Parliament, Rajya Sabha (4th Term)	INC(I)	Jammu and Kashmir	12 December 1985	11 December 1991	5 years, 364 days
