= Ghulam Nabi Azad =

Indian politician (born 1949)

Ghulam Nabi Azad Padma Bhushan
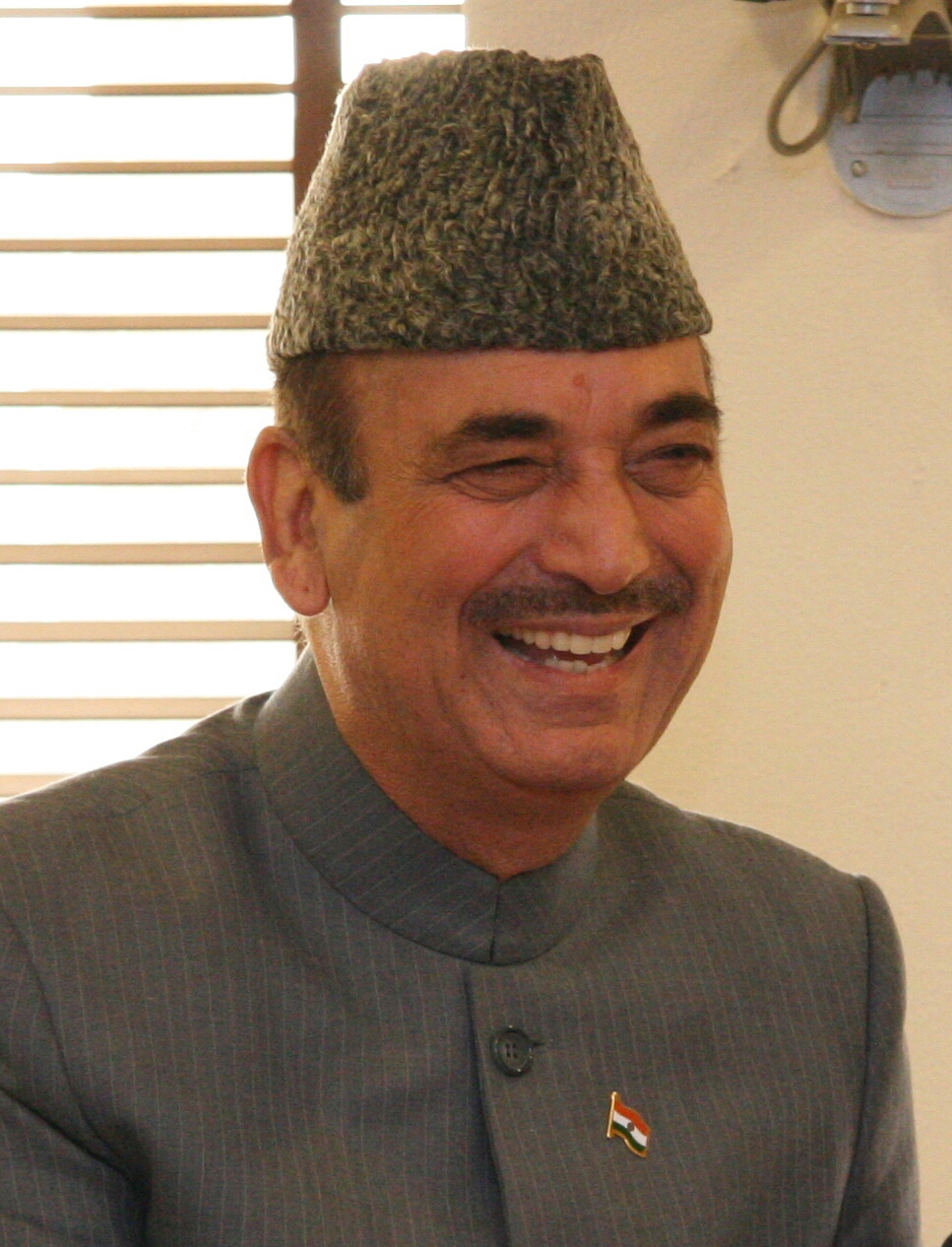
- Official portrait, 2014

Leader of the Opposition in Rajya Sabha
- In office 8 June 2014 – 15 February 2021
- Deputy: Anand Sharma
- Chairman: Mohammad Hamid Ansari; Venkaiah Naidu
- Preceded by: Arun Jaitley
- Succeeded by: Mallikarjun Kharge

Union Minister of Health and Family Welfare
- In office 22 May 2009 – 26 May 2014
- Prime Minister: Manmohan Singh
- Preceded by: Anbumani Ramadoss
- Succeeded by: Harsh Vardhan

7th Chief Minister of Jammu & Kashmir
- In office 2 November 2005 – 11 July 2008
- Governor: Srinivas Kumar Sinha; Narinder Nath Vohra
- Preceded by: Mufti Mohammad Sayeed
- Succeeded by: Omar Abdullah

Member of Parliament, Rajya Sabha
- In office 11 February 2009 – 15 February 2021
- Preceded by: Saifuddin Soz
- Succeeded by: Gurwinder Singh Oberoi
- Constituency: Jammu and Kashmir
- In office 30 November 1996 – 29 January 2006
- Constituency: Jammu and Kashmir

Member of Parliament, Lok Sabha
- In office 18 January 1980 – 28 November 1989
- Preceded by: Vasantrao Naik
- Succeeded by: Anantrao Vithhalrao Deshmukh
- Constituency: Washim, Maharashtra

Chairperson of Democratic Progressive Azad Party
- Incumbent
- Assumed office 26 September 2022
- Preceded by: Office established

Union Minister of Parliamentary Affairs
- In office 23 May 2004 – 1 November 2005
- Prime Minister: Manmohan Singh
- Preceded by: Sushma Swaraj
- Succeeded by: Priya Ranjan Dasmunsi
- In office 18 January 1996 – 16 May 1996
- Prime Minister: P. V. Narasimha Rao
- Preceded by: Vidya Charan Shukla
- Succeeded by: Pramod Mahajan
- In office 21 June 1991 – 18 January 1993
- Prime Minister: P. V. Narasimha Rao
- Preceded by: Satya Prakash Malaviya
- Succeeded by: Vidya Charan Shukla

Personal details
- Born: Ghulam Nabi Bhatt; 7 March 1949 (age 77) Bhalessa, Jammu and Kashmir, India
- Party: Democratic Progressive Azad Party (since 2022)
- Other political affiliations: Indian National Congress (1973–2022)
- Spouse: Shameema Dev Azad (m. 1980)
- Children: Saddam Nabi Azad (son); Sofiya Nabi Azad (daughter)
- Education: Government Degree Colleges, Bhadarwah; G.G.M. Science College; University of Jammu; University of Kashmir
- Awards: Padma Bhushan (2022)

Ghulam Nabi Azad (born 7 March 1949) is an Indian politician who served as Leader of Opposition in Rajya Sabha between 2014 and 2021. He also served as the Chief Minister of erstwhile state of Jammu and Kashmir from 2005 to 2008. On 26 September 2022, Azad announced his own political party as Democratic Progressive Azad Party. He is the chief patron cum founder of Democratic Progressive Azad Party.

Azad served as Minister of Health and Family Welfare. He has served as the Minister of Parliamentary Affairs in the Manmohan Singh government until 27 October 2005, when he was appointed the Chief Minister of Jammu and Kashmir. On 26 August 2022, Azad resigned from Indian National Congress and mulled creating a new party at the national level.

He also led the party successfully in the 2002 Assembly election in Jammu and Kashmir. He was bestowed with the Padma Bhushan, India's third highest civilian award, in 2022 by the Indian Government in the field of Public Affairs.

He was a member of Committee constituted by the Government of India in September 2023 to suggest changes to the constitution for simultaneous polls in the country.

== Early life ==
Ghulam Nabi Azad was born in a village named Soti of Gandoh tehsil (Bhalessa) in the formerly princely state of Jammu and Kashmir's Doda district. His parents were Rahamatullah Batt and Basa Begum. He attended the local school in his village. Later for higher studies he moved to Jammu and received his Bachelor's of Science degree from G.G.M. Science College. Furthermore, he also received a Master's in Zoology degree from the University of Kashmir, Srinagar in 1972.

== Political career ==
Azad started his career soon after working as the secretary for the Block Congress Committee in Bhalessa in 1973. Two years later, he was nominated as the President of the Jammu and Kashmir Pradesh Youth Congress. In 1980, he was appointed the President of the All-India Youth Congress.

After being elected to the Seventh Lok Sabha from Maharashtra's Washim (Lok Sabha constituency) in 1980, Azad entered into the Central government as Deputy Minister in charge of Law, Justice and Company Affairs Ministry in 1982.

Subsequently, he was elected to the Eighth Lok Sabha in 1984 and was a member (1990 - 1996) from Maharashtra in Rajya Sabha. During Rao's government, Azad took charge of Parliamentary Affairs and Civil Aviation ministries. He was subsequently elected to Rajya Sabha from Jammu and Kashmir during the term of 30 November 1996 to 29 November 2002 and 30 November 2002 to 29 November 2008, but resigned on 29 April 2006 as he became Chief Minister of Jammu and Kashmir on 2 November 2005.

The People's Democratic Party, a coalition partner of the Indian National Congress in Jammu and Kashmir, withdrew its support for Azad's government, and rather than attempt to sustain his government by requesting a vote of confidence, Azad resigned on 7 July 2008, and later left office on 11 July 2008.

=== Union government ===
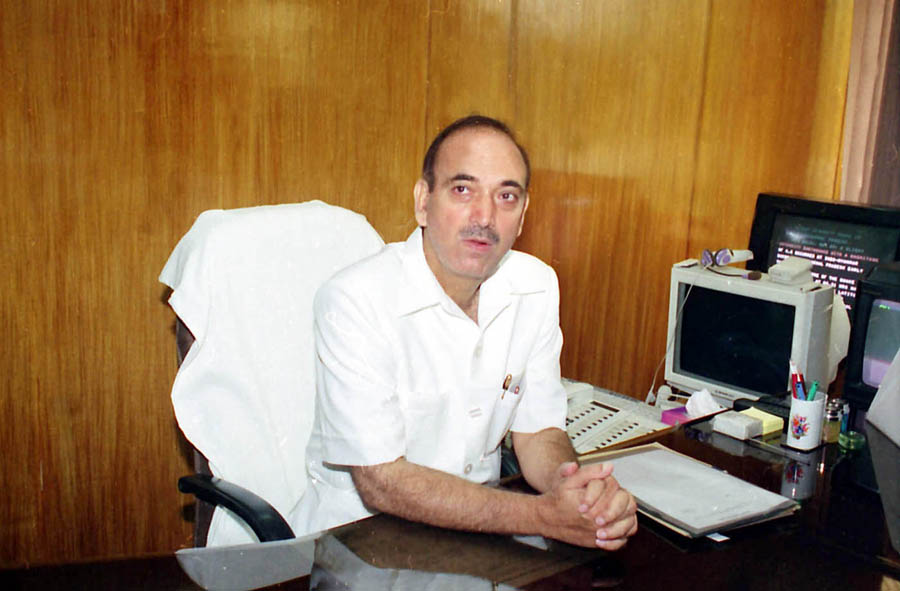
Ghulam Nabi Azad assumes charge as the Union Minister for Urban Development in New Delhi on 25 May 2004

In the second United Progressive Alliance Government, led by Manmohan Singh, Azad was sworn in as the Health Minister of India. He was elected to Rajya Sabha for the fourth and fifth terms from Jammu and Kashmir during the term of 30 November 1996 to 29 November 2002. He vowed to expand the National Rural Health Mission, which has mobilized half a million health workers, all across India, and later his ministry also launched a National Urban Health Mission, to serve the slum dwelling urban poor.

He has suggested a late marriage age of between 25 and 30 for population control, and has said that lack of electricity & thereby absence of TV entertainment in rural areas will cause people to produce more children.

=== Leader of Opposition ===
In June 2014, after the National Democratic Alliance won a majority in the Lok Sabha and formed the Union government, Azad was appointed the leader of opposition in the Rajya Sabha, where Congress still held the majority.

In 2015, Azad got re-elected to the Rajya Sabha from Jammu and Kashmir, despite the PDP-BJP alliance holding a majority of seats in the Legislative Assembly.

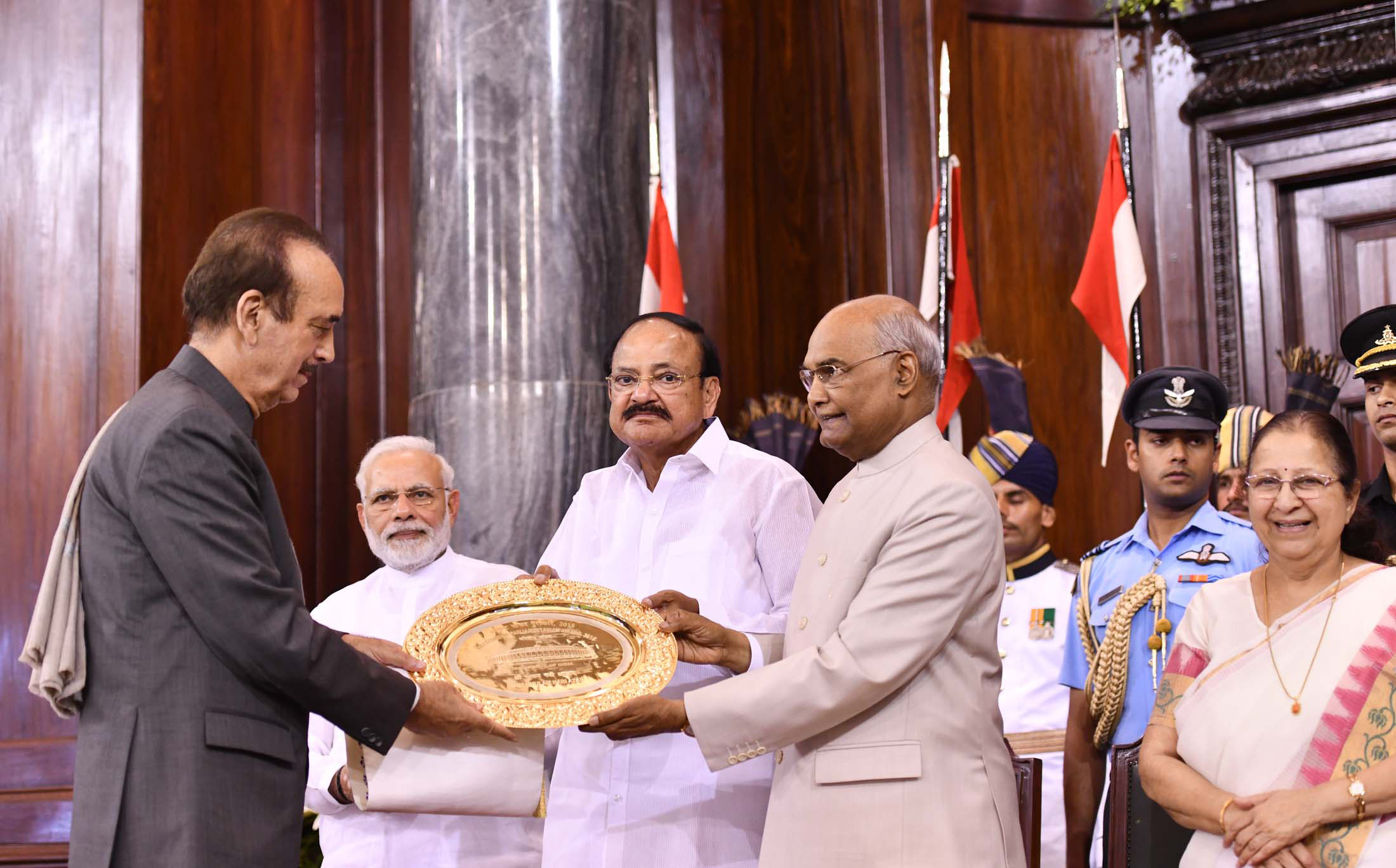
Ram Nath Kovind, President of India presenting the Outstanding Parliamentarian Award for 2015 to Shri Ghulam Nabi Azad, at a function, at Parliament House, New Delhi on August 1, 2018.

=== Resignation from INC ===
In August 2022, Azad resigned from the post of chairman of the Jammu and Kashmir Congress campaign committee hours after his appointment. Sonia Gandhi accepted the resignation from Azad. On 26 August 2022, he resigned from all positions including primary membership of the party. In his resignation letter, he cited destruction of consultative process by Rahul Gandhi as a reason.

== Democratic Progressive Azad Party ==
On 4 September 2022, Azad announced the formation of a new political party after resigning from Indian National Congress. He said the people of Jammu and Kashmir will decide the name and the flag for the new party.

On 26 September 2022, Azad announced the name of his new party as Democratic Progressive Azad Party. The flag of the Democratic Azad Party has three colours: mustard, white, and blue.

== Personal life ==
Azad married Shameema Dev Azad, a well known Kashmiri singer, in 1980, and they have a son Saddam Nabi Azad and a daughter Sofiya Nabi Azad.

== Positions held ==
Year	Description
1980 - 1984	Elected to 7th Lok Sabha: Deputy Minister - Law, Justice and Company Affairs (1982-82); Deputy Minister - Information and Broadcasting (1983–84)
1984 - 1989	Elected to 8th Lok Sabha: Minister of State - Parliamentary Affairs (Dec 1984 - May 1986); Minister of State - Home Affairs (May 1986 - Oct 1986); Minister of State - Food and Civil Supplies (Oct 1986 - Sept 1987)
1991 - 1996	Elected to Rajya Sabha From Maharashtra: Union Minister - Parliamentary Affairs (June 1991 - Dec 1992); Union Minister - Parliamentary Affairs (Jan 1993 - May 1996); Union Minister - Civil Aviation and Tourism (Jan 1993 - May 1996)
1996 - 2002	Elected to Rajya Sabha From Jammu and Kashmir
2002 - 2006	Elected to Rajya Sabha From Jammu and Kashmir: Union Minister - Parliamentary Affairs (May 2004 - Oct 2005); Union Minister - Urban Development (May 2004 - Oct 2005)

== Election history ==
=== Rajya Sabha ===
Position	Party	Constituency	From	To	Tenure
Member of Parliament, Rajya Sabha (1st Term)	INC	Maharashtra	3 Apr 1990	2 Apr 1996	5 years, 365 days
Member of Parliament, Rajya Sabha (2nd Term)	INC	J&K	30 Nov 1996	29 Nov 2002	5 years, 364 days
Member of Parliament, Rajya Sabha (3rd Term)	INC	J&K	30 Nov 2002	29 Apr 2006	3 years, 150 days
Member of Parliament, Rajya Sabha (4th Term)	INC	J&K	11 Feb 2009	10 Feb 2015	5 years, 364 days
Member of Parliament, Rajya Sabha (5th Term)	INC	J&K	16 Feb 2015	15 Feb 2021	5 years, 365 days

=== Lok Sabha ===
Position	Party	Constituency	From	To	Tenure / Result
Member of Parliament, Lok Sabha (1st Term - 7th Lok Sabha)	INC	Washim, Maharashtra	18 Jan 1980	31 Dec 1984	4 years, 347 days Won
Member of Parliament, Lok Sabha (2nd Term - 8th Lok Sabha)	INC	Washim, Maharashtra	31 Dec 1984	27 Nov 1989	4 years, 331 days Won
Candidate, Lok Sabha (16th Lok Sabha)	INC	Udhampur, J&K	2014 Election		Lost to Jitendra Singh
Candidate, Lok Sabha (18th Lok Sabha)	DPAP	Anantnag–Rajouri, J&K	2024 Election		Lost

== Awards ==
- In March 2022, Ghulam Nabi Azad received Padma Bhushan from President Ram Nath Kovind.
- Outstanding Parliamentarian Award 2015, at Parliament House, New Delhi on 1 August 2018

Political offices
Preceded by Mufti Mohammad Sayeed	Chief Minister of Jammu and Kashmir; 2005 – 2008	Succeeded by Omar Abdullah
Preceded by Anbumani Ramadoss	Minister of Health and Family Welfare; 2009 – 2014	Succeeded by Harsh Vardhan
Preceded by Arun Jaitley	Leader of the Opposition in the Rajya Sabha; 2014 – 2021	Succeeded by Mallikarjun Kharge
