= Abdul Ahad Vakil =

Indian politician

- Abdul Ahad Vakil in 2013 at his residence

Member of Parliament, Lok Sabha
- In office 1977–1979
- Constituency: Baramulla

Personal details
- Born: February 1934 Sopore, Baramulla, Jammu and Kashmir
- Died: 9 July 2014 LD Colony, Goripora
- Party: National Conference
- Spouse: Maryam Jan
- Children: 4

Abdul Ahad Vakil (February 1934 – 9 July 2014) was an Indian politician and a Member of parliament elected in the 6th Lok Sabha elections from Jammu and Kashmir's Baramulla constituency. He served as the state minister in 1983 and the speaker of the Jammu and Kashmir Legislative Assembly in 1996. He was the senior member of the National Conference.

== Life and background ==
Vakil was born in Jammu and Kashmir's Sopore district in February 1934. He obtained a Masters of Arts and Bachelor of Laws, initially studying at Amar Singh College, Srinagar and then Aligarh Muslim University.

Vakil was originally a lawyer in 1971 and then nominated as the member of the District Development Board in 1976.

== Social activities ==
Vakil was regarded as the active social worker who was responsible for the establishment of the Government Degree College for Women, Sopore with science up to Bachelor of Science. During his political spanning, He opened several welfare centres for the poor, Widows and physically disabled people in Sopor.

== Personal life ==
The son of Haji Abdul Razaq, he was married to Maryam Jan in 1960, with whom he had one son and three daughters.

== Death ==
Vakil died at the age of 79 at his residence LD Colony, Goripora. He then was admitted to Sher-i-Kashmir Institute of Medical Sciences for medical treatment. After subsequently discharged, He died after multiple organ failure and chest ailment which is associated with respiratory disease.
