= Bashir Ahmad Dar =

Indian politician (born 1962)

Bashir Ahmad Dar (born 1962) is an Indian politician from Jammu and Kashmir. He was an MLA from Kupwara Assembly constituency in Kupwara district. He won the 2014 Jammu and Kashmir Legislative Assembly election representing the Jammu & Kashmir People's Conference.

== Early life and education ==
Bashir Ahmad Dar is from Jagerpora Handwara, Kupwara district, Jammu and Kashmir. He is the son of Mohd. Mukhtar Dar. He completed his B.A. and L.L.B Honours in 1984 at Kashmir University.

== Career ==
Bashir Ahmad Dar won from Kupwara Assembly constituency representing Jammu and Kashmir People's Conference in the 2014 Jammu and Kashmir Legislative Assembly election. He got 24,754 votes and defeated his nearest rival, Mir Mohd Fayaz of the JKPDP, by a margin of 151 votes. He lost from Trehgam Assembly constituency in the 2024 Jammu and Kashmir Legislative Assembly election.

== Electoral performance ==
| Election | Constituency | Party | Result | Votes % | Opposition Candidate | Opposition Party | Opposition vote % | Ref |
|---|---|---|---|---|---|---|---|---|
| 2014 | Kupwara | JKPC | Won | 34.47% | Mir Mohammed Fayaz | JKPDP | 34.26% | |
| 2024 | Trehgam | JKPC | Lost | 26.95% | Saifullah Mir | JKNC | 33.74% | |
