= Saifullah Mir =

Indian politician

Cabinet Minister, Government of Jammu and Kashmir
- Incumbent
- Assumed office 27 October 2026
- Lieutenant Governor: Manoj Sinha
- Chief Minister: Omar Abdullah
- Ministry and Departments: Planning Development and Monitoring Department; Culture Department; Youth Services and Sports Department, ARI & Trainings Department

Member of Jammu and Kashmir Legislative Assembly
- Incumbent
- Assumed office 27 October 2026
- Constituency: Trehgam

Personal details
- Party: Jammu & Kashmir National Conference
- Profession: Politician

Saifullah Mir is an Indian politician from Jammu and Kashmir who is currently serving as Minister of Planning Development and Monitoring Department, Culture Department, Youth Services and Sports Department, ARI & Trainings Department in Government of Jammu and Kashmir . He is a member of the Jammu and Kashmir Legislative Assembly from 2024, representing Trehgam Assembly constituency as a member of the Jammu & Kashmir National Conference party.

== Electoral performance ==
Election	Constituency	Party	Result	Votes %	Opposition Candidate	Opposition Party	Margin	Ref
1996	Kupwara	Jammu and Kashmir National Conference	Won	37.9%	Ch. Salam Ud Din		1011	
2002	Kupwara	Jammu and Kashmir National Conference	Won	43,24%	Ghulam Qadir Mir		132	
2008	Kupwara	Jammu and Kashmir National Conference	Won	30.07%	Fayaz Ahmad Mir		5182	
2014	Kupwara	Jammu and Kashmir National Conference	Lost	24.21%	Bashir Ahmad Dar		7364 (Placed 3rd)	
2024	Trehgam (New Delimitation)	Jammu and Kashmir National Conference	Won	33.74%	Bashir Ahmad Dar	JKPC	3626	

== See also ==
- 2024 Jammu and Kashmir Legislative Assembly election
- Jammu and Kashmir Legislative Assembly
