= Jammu and Kashmir Public Service Commission =

Public recruitment agency in Jammu and Kashmir

- JKPSC

Constitutional body overview
- Formed: 2 September 1957; 69 years ago
- Jurisdiction: Government of Jammu and Kashmir
- Headquarters: Solina, Srinagar, Jammu and Kashmir; 34.0551733°N 74.7995805°E
- Motto: being fair to all and being seen as such
- Constitutional body executive: , Shri. Rama D.S IFS. (Since 10th August, 2026)(Chairman)
- Parent department: Government of Jammu and Kashmir
- Website: jkpsc.nic.in

The Jammu and Kashmir Public Service Commission (JKPSC) is a constitutional body of the union territory of Jammu and Kashmir, India, established by the Constitution of Jammu and Kashmir under articles 128 to 137. It is an autonomous body responsible for the recruitment of candidates for various government jobs under the Government of Jammu and Kashmir through competitive examinations, according to the merits of the candidates and the rules of reservation.

== History ==
The history of Jammu and Kashmir Public Service Commission begins with the Jammu and Kashmir Civil Services Regulation volume-II, which explains the civil services of the state. The concept of conducting statewide competitive examination for appointment to specific posts came into consideration way back between 1954-1957. During the Dogra Rule Maharaja Hari Singh had introduced Civil Service examination for the first time in the state in 1941. Before that the Maharaja used to nominate candidates for civil service training who after completing the training would join the state government. Agha Nasir Ali was the first Kashmiri to top the civil service examination when they were introduced for the first time in 1941. He was the first Deputy Commissioner of Srinagar. Later, the previous rules were revoked by the Kashmir Civil Service Rules, 1954. The formation of JKPSC is revealed by the Indian public service commissions which further explains the Constitution of India in Part XXI along with Article 370, giving autonomous status. Section 128 of the Constitution of J&K describes the formation of JKPSC which indicates the commission was set up on 2 September 1957.

== Background ==
The Jammu and Kashmir Public Service Commission is the top-most constitutional body and senior-most civil services of the Government of India. Its headquarters are located in Solina area of Srinagar city, 190009. The Commission is headed by its chairman who is responsible for the recruitment process, JKPSC policy formulation, and its implementation. The commission chairman including other members are appointed by the state governor. The governor has the right to determine the number of members as well as the members of the commission and their terms of service under certain sections of J&K state.

== Commission office shift ==
Every year, the commission shift its office from one capital to another for the period of six months. It occurs twice in a year, making the JKPSC functioning from May to October in summer capital Srinagar and from November to April in winter capital Jammu. In 1872, Maharaja Gulab Singh started this practice to escape the extreme heat during summers in Jammu and freezing wave of winter in Srinagar where temperature often drop as low as -6 to -4 degrees Celsius.

== Members ==
The commission currently has only 2 members. The office of the Chairman has been vacant since 16th August, 2026.

Name	Position	Previous office
Dr. Rajiv Singh	Member	Former Professor
Asaf Mehmood Sagar	Member	IFS Officer
Mr. Shahbaz Ahmed Mirza	Secretary	Member, J&K Special Tribunal

== Duties and functions ==
- To conducts state wide examinations and recruitment process for appointments to the various posts on state level.
- Every year, it submits a report about the work done by the commission to the state governor.
- To ensure the procedures of transfer, promotion, recruitment, and dismissals of personnel by constitutionally prescribed principles.
- To Report its activities of the performance including any finding in accordance with prescribed values and principles constitutionally.
- To investigate and analyze the application of personnel and public administration practices, and report to the relevant executive authority and legislature of Jammu & Kashmir.
- The commission shall be consulted on all disciplinary matters affecting a person serving under the Government including memorials or petitions relating to such matters.
- To advise on any matter referred to them in compliance with the section 133 of the Constitution of the Indian states.

== Examinations conducted by the commission ==
Jammu and Kashmir Public Service Commission conducts the various Competitive Examinations and Departmental examinations as mandated by section 137 in Part IX of the Constitution of Jammu and Kashmir.

=== Competitive examinations ===
- Jammu and Kashmir Administrative Service, Junior Scale JKAS, JKPS and JKAS (Accounts)
- JKCS (Judicial)
- Medical Officers(Allopathy)
- Veterinary Assistant Surgeon
- Range Officers (wildlife/Territorial/Soil).
- Assistant Director (Statistics)
- Assistant Conservator Of Forest (ACF)

=== Departmental examinations ===
Jk police constable Recruitment

- Excise and Taxation Officers
- Excise and Taxation Inspectors
- Excise and Taxation Sub-Inspectors
- Revenue Service (Executive)
- JKAS Probationers
- Subordinate Accounts Course (SAC-I)
- Subordinate Accounts Course (SAC-II)
- Accounts Clerk Course (ACC)
- IAS Probationers
- Labour Inspectors/Officers
- Executive Engineer (Accounts)
- Assistant Engineer (Accounts)
- Junior Statistical Assistant Course
- Statistical Assistant Course
- Statistical Officer

== See also ==
- List of Public service commissions in India
