= Jammu and Kashmir Administrative Service =

Civil service of the Government of Jammu and Kashmir

Jammu and Kashmir Administrative Service (JKAS) Jammu and Kashmir Accounts Service (JKAS Accounts)
Service overview
- Service recruitment board: Jammu and Kashmir Public Service Commission (JKPSC)
- Area served: Jammu and Kashmir, India
- Union Territory: Jammu and Kashmir
- Legal personality: Governmental; civil service
- Selection: Combined Competitive Examination
- Association: JKAS /JAKFAS Association
- Entry Pay level: Level 8 (47600–151100)

Head of the civil services
- Administration: Government of Jammu and Kashmir

The Jammu and Kashmir Administrative Service is the administrative civil service of the Indian union territory of Jammu and Kashmir. The officers for this post are recruited by the Jammu and Kashmir Public Service Commission through an exam which is known as JKAS examination. The statewide combined competitive examination is conducted for recruitment of various state civil service. While the Jammu and Kashmir Accounts Service is a civil service responsible for overseeing the Financial Administration and Management of the Union territory of Jammu and Kashmir. Its primary responsibility is safeguarding the state's exchequer and public funds. Officers for this role are selected through the JKAS examination conducted by the Jammu and Kashmir Public Service Commission. "

== Examination process ==
The examination is conducted in three phases – a preliminary selection of candidate, consisting of objective-type papers which approves the eligibility of candidates to enter the main examination. The second and main phase consists of a nine question papers of essay type, necessitating candidates in descriptive type answers. and phase-III consists of viva exam pattern, involving the candidates to challenge the Oral exam, intending to judge the mental caliber of a candidate for various subject.On attempting the number of questions for the JKAS post, the percentage of points are deducted in decimal numbers for each incorrect answer which makes negative marking on the pattern of Union Public Service Commission.

== Selection, delegation of roles ==
The selected candidates (JKAS officers) take up various administrative posts at the district level such as Sub Divisional Magistrate or Additional Deputy Commissioners and if needed, they are promoted to the IAS officer ranks like District collector (commonly known as Deputy Commissioners) after serving as the JKAS officer for a specific period. The promotion process and decisions are made by the Government of Jammu and Kashmir

The Selected Candidates in J&K Accounts Services ( JKAS Accounts) assume diverse roles in Financial administration and Management within the Union Territory of Jammu and Kashmir.

Hierarchy in JKAS (Accounts)

1. Accounts officer /Additional Treasury Officer/ Instructor/ Audit officer/ Fund officer/ P&AO.

2. Chief Accounts Officer/District Treasury Officer/Senior Instructor/District Fund Officer/Deputy Director/ CPAO.

3. Financial Advisor & CAOs/Saddar Treasuries/Joint Director.

4. Director Finance(s)/Director Accounts & Treasuries/Principal NZATI and ATI.

5. Director Generals:

- DG Accounts and Treasuries.

- DG Codes Division.

- DG Budget Division.

- DG Resources Division.

- DG Audit & Inspections.

- DG Local Fund Audit & Pension.

- DG Funds Organization

== History ==
The history of Jammu and kashmir Public Service Commission dates back to 1954 when there was no official recruiting agency in the state. It came into existence between 1954 and 1957, under the section 128 along with the Constitution of J&K State.

== Responsibilities of a JKAS officer ==
The JKAS officers (civil administrators) are subdivisions of the government, executing the critical actions in their respective departments as they are working at state or district level. Most of departments in J&K state are either headed by an IAS officer or a JKAS officer. The officers deal with public relations and are responsible to reduce the corruption. The officers are also responsible for internal security affairs at district level, regulating law and order to maintaining peace, and developing infrastructure for all aspects of daily operations in their respectives districts or departments.

Responsibilities of JKAS( Accounts)

1.Financial Management: JKAS (Accounts) officers are responsible for financial planning, budgeting, and expenditure management in various Government departments,/ Autonomous Bodies/ Corporations/Universities contributing to efficient resource allocation and management. These responsibilities include acting as Drawing and Disbursing officers( DDOs, custodians of financial records, preparing budget estimates and Budget releases, purchases, providing financial advice, and serving as nodal officers for various finance related portals like BEAMS/PFMS/DBT/JkpaySys/CPIS. They're also responsible for reconciliation of receipts/expenditures and clearing audit inspection reports.

2. Audit and Accountability: They oversee financial audits(Snap Audits/Special Audits/Concurrent Audits/Compliance Audits/Scheme Audits), ensuring compliance with fiscal regulations and promoting transparency and accountability in public finances.
