= Mohammad Dilawar Mir =

Indian politician

Mohammad Dilawar Mir is a well known Indian politician and member of the Jammu and Kashmir Apni Party. Mir was a member of the Jammu and Kashmir Legislative Assembly from the Rafiabad constituency 5 times in Baramulla district. His son Yawar Mir took over the same in 2014 becoming MLA in J&K. Dilawar Mir left Jammu and Kashmir Peoples Democratic Party in February 2020 to form Apni party.

== Controversies ==
In 2014, Mir was convicted by a special CBI court in Delhi for wrongfully releasing of ₹30 lakh and the awarding of a contract for the sale of urea fertilizer to his firm by National Fertilizers Limited (NFL) between 1993 and 1996. NFL suffered a financial loss due to the irregularities, and imposed a fine of ₹3.21 crore on Mir, with ₹3.19 crore to be paid as compensation to NFL. Although Mir was granted bail and his sentence was suspended until January 2015, the conviction disqualified him from contesting the upcoming elections.
