= Saifuddin Soz =

Indian politician

Prof. Saifuddin Soz
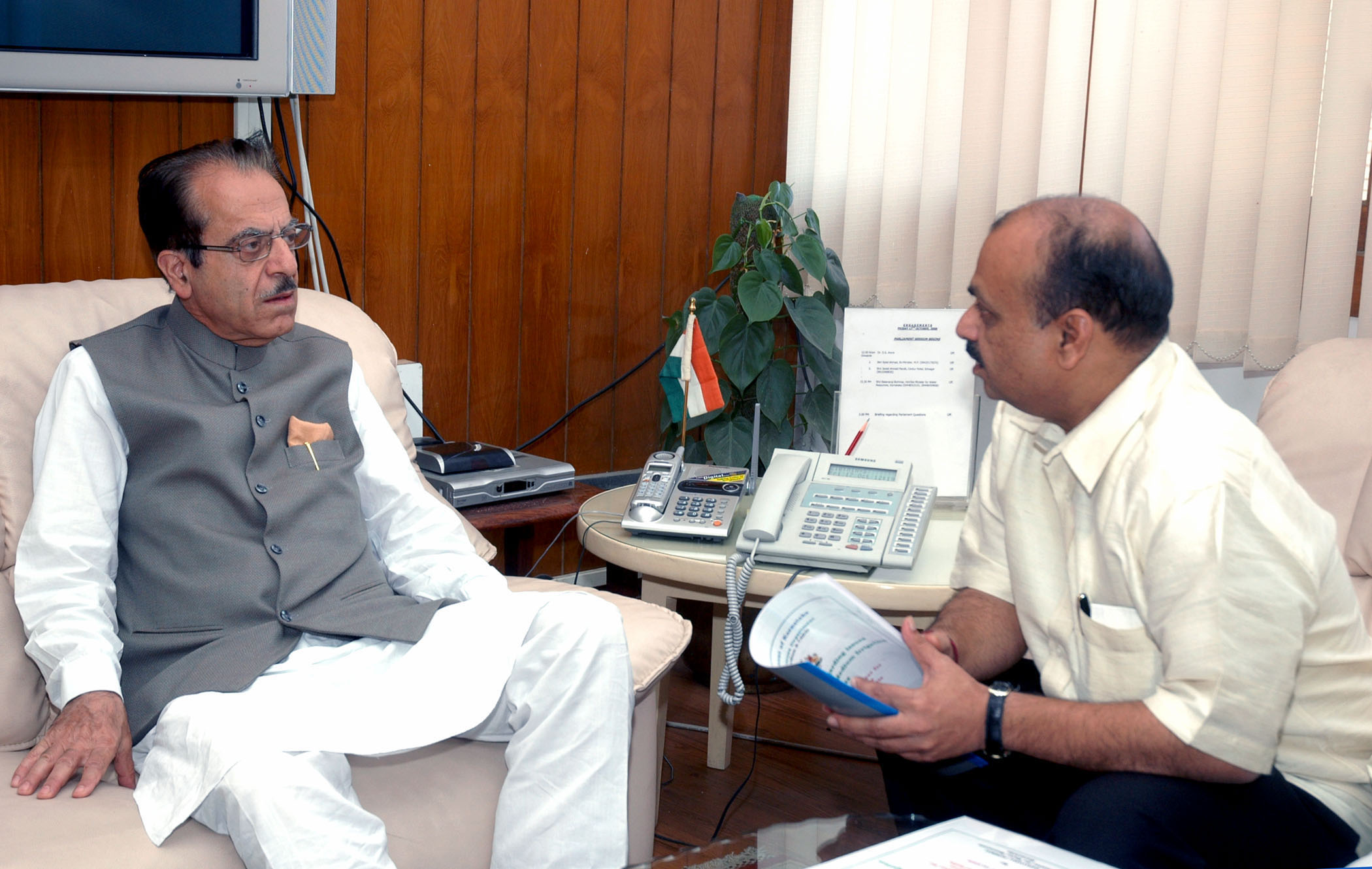
- The Union Minister for Water Resources, Prof. Saifuddin Soz (left), in New Delhi on October 17, 2008 with Basavaraj Bommai (right), the Minister for Water Resources, Government of Karnataka.

Minister of Water Resources
- In office 22 May 2004 – 22 May 2009
- Prime Minister: Manmohan Singh
- Preceded by: Santosh Mohan Dev
- Succeeded by: Meira Kumar

Member of Parliament, Rajya Sabha
- In office 2009–2015
- In office 2002–2008
- In office 1996–1998

Member of the Lok Sabha for Baramulla
- In office 1998–1999
- Preceded by: Ghulam Rasool Kar
- Succeeded by: Abdul Rashid Shaheen
- In office 1983–1991
- Preceded by: Khwaja Mubarak Shah
- Succeeded by: Ghulam Rasool Kar

Personal details
- Born: 23 November 1937 (age 88) Sopore, Jammu and Kashmir, British India
- Party: Indian National Congress
- Education: University of Kashmir

Professor Saifuddin Soz (born 23 November 1937) is an Indian professor and former seven term member of the Parliament of India. Soz hails from the Indian Union territory of Jammu and Kashmir.

He had been India's Minister of Water Resources in India's 14th Lok Sabha and Minister of Environment and Forests in the 1990s. In January 2006, he was nominated to the Congress Working Committee, the executive committee of the Indian National Congress.

== Early life ==
Soz was born in Sopore, a township in the northern Kashmir Valley. He worked his way to completing a master's degree in economics from the University of Kashmir, where he later held the position of registrar.

From there, Soz moved to the Jammu and Kashmir State Board of School Education (BOSE), a government department responsible for administration of schools. Soz sought voluntary retirement from government service to enter politics in 1983. At that time, he was Secretary of the BOSE.

== Career ==
In 1983, Lok Sabha election, Soz contested and won the Baramulla seat as a candidate of the ruling Jammu and Kashmir National Conference party.

At the time, the Jammu and Kashmir National Conference was headed by Farooq Abdullah. Soz went on to win three more Lok Sabha elections as a member of the Jammu and Kashmir National Conference. He also represented the Jammu and Kashmir National Conference and the state of Jammu and Kashmir in the Rajya Sabha in the mid-'90s.

In 1997-98, he became India's Minister of Environment and Forests in the cabinet of Prime Minister Inder Kumar Gujral. Before that in 1996-97, Soz served in the same capacity under Prime Minister H.D. Deve Gowda.

In 1999, Soz was expelled from the Jammu and Kashmir National Conference party for voting against the government of Prime Minister Atal Behari Vajpayee. Soz was a Jammu and Kashmir National Conference member of parliament and defied his party's leadership. His sole vote toppled the National Democratic Alliance, which led the then Prime Minister Atal Behari Vajpayee to tender his resignation to then President of India K. R. Narayanan.

In 2003, Soz joined the Indian National Congress and was elected to the Rajya Sabha. In January 2006, he was inducted into the ministry of Prime Minister Dr. Manmohan Singh as Minister of Water Resources, a position he held until early 2009. Soz was appointed President of the Jammu and Kashmir Pradesh (state) Congress Committee in February 2008.

== WikiLeaks ==
A United States diplomatic cable leaked by the whistle blowing website WikiLeaks, claimed that Soz was facilitating a discreet dialogue between Indian government, and Kashmiri separatist leaders before 2006. The cable sent by then US Ambassador to India, David Mulford, to State Department in the United States, describes Soz as a long standing ‘contact’ of the (US) Embassy’s political section.

== Election History ==
=== Rajya Sabha ===
Position	Party	Constituency	From	To	Tenure
Member of Parliament, Rajya Sabha (1st Term)	JKNC	J&K	26 Nov 1996	10 Mar 1998	1 year, 104 days
Member of Parliament, Rajya Sabha (2nd Term)	INC	J&K	30 Nov 2002	29 Nov 2008	5 years, 365 days
Member of Parliament, Rajya Sabha (3rd Term)	INC	J&K	11 Feb 2009	10 Feb 2015	5 years, 364 days

== House Arrest ==
Soz faced significant controversy in 2019–2020 when he was allegedly placed under house arrest following the abrogation of Article 370 in Jammu and Kashmir. His wife, filed a habeas corpus petition in the Supreme Court through Abhishek Manu Singhvi, claiming his detention was unconstitutional. The Jammu and Kashmir administration denied detaining him, stating he was free to move with security clearance, but Soz and opposition leaders, contested this, alleging he was restricted. The Supreme Court closed the case after accepting the administration’s affidavit, though Soz maintained he remained under de facto detention and was released after a period of one year.

== Bibliography ==
Soz has written and edited several books including:

1. Kashmir Crisis (Soz, Saifuddin) (ed). 1993
2. Why Autonomy to Kashmir (Soz, Saifuddin) (ed). 1995
3. Secularism - an Interpretation
4. Daj (A play in Kashmiri on abuses of Dowry system)
5. Kashmir- Glimpses of History and the Story of Struggle, His most comprehensive book on the history of the Kashmir Crisis and the Indo-Pak duopoly

He also translated M. Illin's book 1,00,000 Whys from Russian to Kashmiri, an effort for which he received the Soviet Land Nehru Award. He has written essays and short stories in Kashmiri, several articles in reputed newspapers and journals on a variety of subjects like Islam and modernism, rights of women, secularism, literature, education and economics. He is also the recipient of several literary awards including Soviet Land Nehru Award, All India Basic Literature Competition Award and Competition for Literature for Neo-Literates Award.
