= Durga Prasad Dhar =

Indian politician and diplomat (1918-1975)

Ambassador Durga Prasad Dhar

Ambassador to the Soviet Union
- In office 1969–1971
- Preceded by: Kewal Singh
- Succeeded by: K.S. Shelvankar

Ambassador of India to Soviet Union
- In office 1975–1975
- Preceded by: K.S. Shelvankar
- Succeeded by: Inder Kumar Gujral

Personal details
- Born: Durga Prasad Dhar; 10 May 1918 Srinagar, Jammu and Kashmir, British India
- Died: 12 June 1975 (aged 57)
- Children: Vijay Dhar
- Education: Tyndale Biscoe School
- Alma mater: Punjab University; Lucknow University
- Occupation: Diplomat, Ambassador of India to Soviet Union

Durga Prasad Dhar, commonly known as D. P. Dhar (1918–1975), was an Indian politician and diplomat who is considered as the chief architect of the Indian intervention in the 1971 Bangladesh Liberation War. Dhar was a close adviser and confidant of Indira Gandhi. He served as the Ambassador of India to the Soviet Union, and as a minister in the Government of Jammu and Kashmir as well as the Government of India.

== Early life and education ==
Dhar was born on May 10, 1918, in Srinagar in the princely state of Jammu and Kashmir in British India into a Kashmiri Pandit family. He studied at the Tyndale Biscoe School in Sheikh Bagh. He earned his bachelor's degree from the University of the Punjab in Lahore and went on to complete his LLB from the University of Lucknow.

== Career ==
=== Political ===
Dhar joined the Quit Kashmir movement in 1946, which was led by Sheikh Abdullah against Maharaja Hari Singh of Kashmir. He is reported to have played a key role in assisting the Indian Army during the Indo-Pakistani War of 1947. He helped the Indian officers interact with the population and collect porters, mules and other kinds of administrative help which facilitated the soldiers' job.

Dhar was subsequently appointed the Home Secretary and then the Deputy Home Minister of Jammu and Kashmir in 1948, when Sheikh Abdullah was the Prime Minister. He was a Member of the Jammu and Kashmir State Constituent Assembly from 1951 to 1957 which endorsed Kashmir's accession to India. He was also a Member of the State Assembly from 1957 to 1967, and was appointed Cabinet Minister, in-charge of various portfolios. He was later elected to the Rajya Sabha from Jammu and Kashmir in 1972. He was appointed as the Union Minister for Planning in July, 1972.

Dhar was a close associate of Indira Gandhi and was instrumental in finalising the 1972 Indo-Bangladesh treaty of peace, friendship and co-operation. He became one of the closest confidants of the Nehru-Gandhi family and also played a significant role in the 1972 Simla agreement between India and Pakistan.

=== Diplomacy ===
Dhar was a member of the Indian delegation to the United Nations security council meeting in 1949 and the Indian delegation to United Nations General Assembly in the Paris Session of 1952. He was the ambassador of India to the Soviet Union between 1969-1971 and then again from 1975 till his death.

He negotiated the 1971 Indo-Soviet Treaty of Friendship and Cooperation and was a principal architect of India's military intervention in neighbouring East Pakistan's civil war, which led to the creation of independent Bangladesh.

The D.P. Dhar Hall at Embassy of India in Moscow is named in his honour.

=== Death ===
D.P. Dhar died of a heart attack on 12 June 1975.

== Awards ==
In 2012, Bangladesh president Zillur Rahman conferred the Liberation War Friendship Honour (posthumous) to Durga Prasad Dhar in recognition of his pioneering role in concluding the 1971 Indo-Soviet Friendship Treaty, mobilising international support in favour of Bangladesh and playing a special role in support of the Liberation War. Vijay Dhar, son of D.P. Dhar received the honour on his behalf in Dhaka.
