= Ghulam Ahmad Ashai =

Khwaja Ghulam Ahmad Ashai
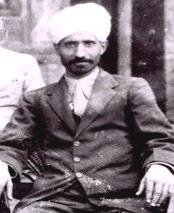

Co Founder, All Jammu & Kashmir Muslim Conference

Personal details
- Born: Khwaja Ghulam Ahmad Ashai Srinagar, J&K, India
- Citizenship: Indian
- Party: All Jammu & Kashmir Muslim Conference
- Education: University of Punjab; University of Calcutta
- Occupation: Political leader

Khwaja Ghulam Ahmad Ashai (Arabic: غولم أحمد أشي) was an Indian Kashmiri bureaucrat and political leader.

== Life ==
He was the grandson of Mukhthar Shah Ashai.

In reward for his service and academic achievements, Sheikh Mohammad Abdullah appointed Ghulam Ahmad Ashai as the first Registrar of the University of Kashmir, both for academic and administrative matters, from 1948 to 1953. He led the first convocation of the University of Kashmir at Sher-e-Kashmir (Lion of Kashmir) Park and was followed by a distinguished panel including the first Prime Minister of India, Jawaharlal Nehru and the Pro-Indian Sheikh Abdullah. Ashai's involvement with Kashmir University started when he was appointed as the Special Officer assigned with the responsibility of starting Kashmir's first university. Ashai spent the next two years touring universities across India building up strategic ties and relations with renowned and established universities.

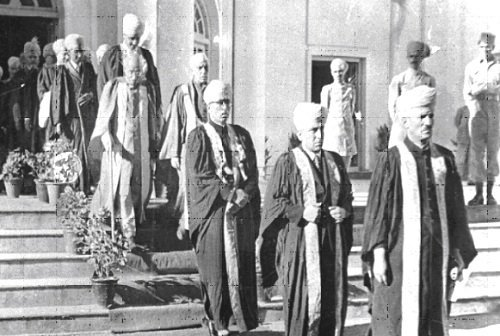
1951 – The first Convocation procession of the University of Jammu & Kashmir led by Ashai, the Registrar. He is followed by the Vice Chancellor, Wazir Janki Nath (Chief Justice), Sheikh Abdullah (Prime Minister of J&K), Pandit Nehru (Prime Minister of India), C. Rajagopalachari (the Governor General of India) and Karan Singh (the Yuvraj at the time).

In the 1980 Sheikh Abdullah's National Conference government, in recognition of Ashai's contributions as founding registrar designated the main road leading to the present university campus in Hazratbal as Ghulam Ahmad Ashai Road.
