= Ladoora =

Ladoora Ladoor
- Village
- Location in Jammu and Kashmir, India Ladoora (India)
- Coordinates: 34.25°N 74.38°E
- Country: India
- Union territory: Jammu and Kashmir
- District: Baramulla

Languages
  - Official: Kashmiri, Urdu, Hindi, Dogri, English
- Time zone: UTC+5:30 (IST)
- PIN: 193301

Ladoora is a notified area and village in the Baramulla district, Jammu and Kashmir, India. It is located on the banks of River Jhelum. It is approximately seven kilometers from Sopore and 8 kilometres from Baramulla. Ladoora has a playground known by the name of Nagbal cricket ground.

Ladoora Rafiabad is known for fruit business.There are various essential departments like Flood control and irrigation department, PHE, Fisheries Department, Animal and sheep Husbandry Department etc.Moving to education There are various educational institutions including Middle, High and Higher secondary schools.

Several business and political personalities belong to Ladoora Rafiabad.

Name	Politics	Business
Syed Altaf Hussain Bukhari	Y	Y
Javid Ahmad Dar	Y	N
Gh. Mohd Khan	Y	
