= Timeline of the Kashmir conflict (1846–1946) =

The following is a timeline of the Kashmir conflict during the period 1846–1946.

== 1846–1930: Early princely state ==
- 1846: Jammu and Kashmir (J&K) State is created with the signing of the Treaty of Amritsar between the British East India company and Raja Gulab Singh of Jammu.
- 1857: The War of independence, The Subcontinent fractured into hundreds of states.

== 1931–1940: Political mobilisation ==
1931

- 1931: A widespread agitation triggered by a militant speech at the Khanqah-e-Moulain Srinagar by a Pashtun cook of a European officer occurred in the state. It resulted in the introduction of political reforms by the Maharaja.

1932

- April 1932: Glancy Commission recommends the establishment of a legislative assembly, called the Praja Sabha. It would have 75 members, with 15 official representatives, 33 elected representatives and the remaining seats held by the Maharaja's nominees. Of the 33 elected seats, 21 are reserved for Muslims, 10 for Hindus and 2 for Sikhs.
- June 1932: All Jammu and Kashmir Muslim Conference founded by Sheikh Abdullah in collaboration with Chaudhry Ghulam Abbas to fight for the rights of State's Muslims.

1934

- September 1934: The first elections for the Praja Sabha (the state's legislative assembly) are held. The Muslim Conference wins 14 of the 21 seats reserved for Muslims. Soon afterwards, the younger leaders of the Muslim Conference plead for broadening the party to include all the people of the state.

1937

- May 1937: Sheikh Abdullah elected president of the Muslim Conference. He demands responsible government.
- July 1937: By-elections held for the Legislative Assembly. Muslim Conference emerges victorious.
- August 1937: High Court reduces the prison sentence of three Muslims convicted of cow slaughter to one year. Protests by Hindu in Reasi, Udhampur, Kishtwar, Jammu and Bhimber.
- September 1937: Srinagar session of the Legislative Assembly. The Muslim Conference members boycott the proceedings citing their demands.

1938

- January 1938: Sheikh Abdullah's first meeting with Jawaharlal Nehru in a Lahore railway station. Abdullah's efforts to secularise the Muslim Conference supported by Nehru.
- January 1938: Muslim Conference Working Committee meets in Jammu. Maulana Sayeed Masoodi moves a resolution to rename Muslim Conference but withdraws it in the face of opposition.
- March 1938: At the annual session of the Muslim Conference, Sheikh Abdullah proposes amendments to the Constitution, including renaming of the party. Masoodi and Raja Mohammad Akbar introduce a resolution. Chaudhry Ghulam Abbas and Abdul Majid Qureshi request time to study the proposal.
- May 1938: Second elections for the state's Legislative Assembly (Praja Sabha). Sheikh Abdullah campaigns on the platform of renaming the Muslim Conference. The party wins 19 seats, all the contested ones. Two other independent candidates that won are said to have joined the Muslim Conference later.
- May 1938: Hindu Progressive Party launched, pledging support to Hindu–Muslim unity.
- June 1938: Sheikh Abdullah introduces the resolution for renaming the Muslim Conference to National Conference in the Working Committee of the party. The resolution carries with fourteen of the twenty members supporting. Four members oppose the resolution: Chaudhry Ghulam Abbas, Abdul Majid Qureshi and Chowdry Sheikh Abdullah Bhati from Jammu and Master Abdul Aziz from Muzaffarabad.

1939

- 10–11 June 1939: Under Sheikh Abdullah's leadership, a special session of the Muslim Conference changes its name to National Conference and throws it open to people of all religions, 175 delegates vote in favour and 3 delegates against. At the same time, the National Conference joins the All India States Peoples Conference, a Congress-allied group of movements in princely states.

1940

- 23 March 1940: The Lahore Resolution is proposed by Muhammad Ali Jinnah and seconded by Sikandar Hayat Khan and Fazlul Haq. Referring to British India, it states "That geographically contiguous units are demarcated into regions which should be so constituted, with such territorial readjustments as may be necessary, that the areas in which the Muslims are numerically in a majority, as in the North-Western and Eastern zones of India should be grouped to constitute Independent States in which the constituent units shall be autonomous and sovereign". There is no mention of "Pakistan", an acronym invented by Chaudhury Rehmat Ali in England, but the Lahore Resolution later becomes known as the Pakistan Resolution.

== 1941–1946: Emerging conflict ==
1941

- 1941: Chaudhry Ghulam Abbas breaks off from National Conference and revives the old Muslim Conference. The Muslim Conference becomes a client of the Jinnah-led Muslim League.
- 1941: 71,667 Kashmiris join the British Indian Army for the World War II, seven-eighths of them Muslim, mainly from the Poonch-Mirpur area.

1944

- April 1944: Sheikh Abdullah proposes a Naya Kashmir (New Kashmir) programme to the Maharaja, calling for a constitutional monarchy.
- Summer 1944: Mohammad Ali Jinnah visits Kashmir, supports Muslim Conference in preference to National Conference.

1946

- May 1946: Sheikh Abdullah launches the "Quit Kashmir" movement against the Maharaja. He is arrested. Jawaharlal Nehru attempts to go to Kashmir to defend Abdullah. He is arrested and forced to leave the State.
- October 1946: Muslim Conference launches a `Campaign of Action' demanding the end of autocratic rule by the Maharaja. Chaudhry Ghulam Abbas imprisoned.

== See also ==
- Timeline of the Kashmir conflict
- List of topics on the land and the people of "Jammu and Kashmir"
