= Ghulam Rasool Kar =

Indian politician

Member of Jammu and Kashmir Constituent Assembly
- In office 1951–1957

Member of Jammu and Kashmir Legislative Assembly
- In office 1957–1962

Minister in the Government of Jammu and Kashmir
- In office 1965–1971
- In office 1972–1975

Member of Rajya Sabha
- In office 1984–1987

Personal details
- Born: 19 June 1921
- Died: 10 April 2015 (aged 93)
- Party: Indian National Congress
- Profession: Politician

Ghulam Rasool Kar (19 June 1921 – 10 April 2015) was an Indian politician from Jammu and Kashmir.

== Career ==
He became a member of the Jammu and Kashmir Constituent Assembly in 1951 and the Jammu and Kashmir Legislative Assembly in 1957. He served as a minister in the Government of Jammu and Kashmir in 1965-71 and 1972–75. He was nominated as a member of Rajya Sabha in 1984 and served till 1987. He was elected as Member of parliament in year 1996. He has served as state chief of Jammu and Kashmir Pradesh Congress Committee. On 10 April 2015, Ghulam Rasool Kar died at SKIMS after a brief illness at the age of 94.

== Sources ==
- Brief Biodata
