= Rafiabad, India =

Rohama
- Tehsil
- Location in Jammu and Kashmir, India Rohama (India)
- Coordinates: 34°12′40″N 74°20′27″E
- Country: India
- Union territory: Jammu and Kashmir
- District: Baramulla

Government
  - Type: Democratic
- Elevation: 1,577 m (5,174 ft)

Languages
  - Official: Kashmiri, Urdu, Hindi, Dogri, English
- Time zone: UTC+5:30 (IST)
- PIN: 193301
- Vehicle registration: JK05

Rafiabad is a Tehsil in Baramulla of Jammu and Kashmir, India. The tehsil headquarters is in Rohama town. It is located to the west of Baramulla, about 12 km from district headquarters, and 70 km from the state capital Srinagar to the north west.

Rafiabad is surrounded by Dangiwacha Tehsil, watergam Tehsil, Baramulla Tehsil, and Sopore Tehsil. Baramulla, Sopore, are the nearby cities.

People of the village are mainly dependent on agriculture and horticulture.
