= List of terrorist incidents in India =

This is a list of terrorist incidents in India. In July 2016, the Government of India released data saying that since 2005, terrorist attacks in India had killed 707 people and left over 3,200 injured.

== List of terror attacks in India by date ==
=== 1970–1979 ===
Date	Incidents & Description	Location	People Killed	Injured	Status of the Case	Perpetrators
30 January 1971	1971 Indian Airlines hijacking	India-Pakistan	0	0	Verdict Given	Islamist terrorists (Group affiliation unknown)
10 September 1976	Hijacking of Indian Airlines plane Boeing 737	Delhi	0	0	Arrested but later released during trial in Pakistan due to "lack of evidence"	Islamist terrorists (Group affiliation unknown)
20 December 1978	Hijacking of Indian Airlines Flight 410	Calcutta-Delhi	0	0	Verdict Given (Later cases were withdrawn by the government)	Bholanath Pandey and Devendra Pandey (members of INC)

=== 1980–1989 ===
Date	Incidents & Description	Location	People Killed	Injured	Status of the Case	Perpetrators
8 June 1980	Mandai massacre	Tripura	500	N/A	Unsolved	Tripura Insurgent Groups
29 September 1981	Hijacking of Indian Airlines IC-423	Delhi - Amritsar	0	0	Verdict Given	Dal Khalsa
4 August 1982	1982 Hijacking	Delhi-Srinagar	0	0	N/A	Khalistani Radical (Group affiliation unknown)
20 August 1982	Hijacking of Boeing 737-200	Jodhpur - Delhi	0	0	Killed	Khalistani Radical (Group affiliation unknown)
27 October 1982	1982 Amritsar Bombing	Punjab	1	60	N/A	Khalistani Radicals (Group affiliation unknown)
23 April 1983	Murder of A. S. Atwal	Punjab	1	2	N/A	Khalistani Radical (Group affiliation unknown)
6 October 1983	1983 Dhilwan bus massacre	Punjab	6		Unsolved	Khalistani Radicals (Group affiliation unknown)
13 October 1983	1983 Delhi Grenade Attack	Delhi	5	30	NA	Khalistani Radicals (Group affiliation unknown)
14 October 1983	1983 New Delhi Railway Station (NDLS) Bombing	Delhi	0	25	NA	Khalistani Radicals (Group affiliation unknown)
14 October 1983	1983 Chandigarh Bombing	Chandigarh	3	25	N/A	Khalistani Radicals (Group affiliation unknown)
18 November 1983	1983 Kapurthala Buss Massacre	Punjab	4		N/A	Khalistani Radicals (Group affiliation unknown)
21 May 1984	1984 Moga Bus Massacre	Punjab	13	20	N/A	Khalistani Radicals (Group affiliation unknown)
1-10 June 1984	Seizing of Golden Temple	Punjab	700	279	Military Action conducted against Khalistani Radicals	Sikh militants: Damdami Taksal; All India Sikh Student Federation; Babbar Khalsa
5 July 1984	Hijacking of Indian Airlines Flight 423	Srinagar - Delhi	0	0	Surrendered	Dal Khalsa
2 August 1984	Meenambakkam bomb blast	Tamil Nadu	30	25	Verdict given	Tamil Eelam Army
24 August 1984	Hijacking of Indian Airlines Flight 421	Delhi - Srinagar	0	0	Verdict given	Khalistani Terrorist(Group affiliation unknown)
31 October 1984	Assassination of Indira Gandhi	New Delhi	2	4	Verdict given	Khalistani Militants
10 May 1985	1985 Transistor Bombings	Delhi NCR	70	127	Unsolved	Unknown
23 June 1985	Air India Flight 182 Bombing	Canada-India	329 (268 Canadian citizens, 27 British citizens, and 22 Indian citizens)		Suicide Attack (Commission of Inquiry was conducted)	Babbar Khalsa
27 March 1986	1986 Ludhiana Massacre	Punjab	13	18	N/A	Khalistani Radicals (Group affiliation unknown)
8 June 1986	1986 Targetted Killings	Punjab	9		N/A	Khalistani Radicals (Group affiliation unknown)
25 July 1986	1986 Muktsar bus Massacre	Punjab	15		N/A	Khalistani Radicals (Group affiliation unknown)
5 September 1986	Pan Am Flight 73 Hijacking	India-Pakistan-Germany-USA	21	120	Verdict Given	Abu Nidal Organization
30 November 1986	1986 Hoshiarpur Bus Massacre	Punjab	24		N/A	Khalistani Radicals (Group affiliation unknown)
6 July 1987	1987 Lalru bus massacre	Haryana	36	60	N/A	Khalistan Commando Force
7 July 1987	1987 Fatehabad bus massacre	Haryana	34		NA	Khalistani Radicals (Group affiliation unknown)
14 June 1987	1987 Birthday Massacre	Punjab	12		N/A	Khalistan Commando Force
20 October 1987	1987 Chittaranjan Park Shooting	Delhi	11	7	N/A	Bhindranwale Tigers Force of Khalistan (BTFK)
19 February 1988	1988 Court Bombings	Punjab	13	50	N/A	Khalistan Commando Force
8 January 1989	1989 Revenge Killings	Punjab	14		N/A	Khalistani Radicals (Group affiliation unknown)
25 June 1989	1989 Moga Massacre	Punjab	27		N/A	Khalistani Radicals (Group affiliation unknown)
14 September 1989	Assassination of BJP leader and Lawyer Tika Lal Taploo.	Jammu and Kashmir	1	0	Unsolved, Not entertained	JKLF
4 November 1989	Murder of retired Judge Nilkanth Ganjoo	Jammu and Kashmir	1	0	N/A	JKLF

=== 1990–1999 ===
Date	Incidents & Description	Location	People Killed	Injured	Status of the Case	Perpetrators
4 January 1990	Exodus of Kashmiri Hindus	Jammu and Kashmir	217	N/A	90,000–100,000 Hindu Kashmiri Pandits fled the Kashmir Valley. Attempts were made to relocate them but remained largely unsuccessful. Verdicts were given in some cases, but majority remained unsolved.	Jammu Kashmir Liberation Front (JKLF); Hizbul Mujahideen; Lashkar-e-Toiba
13 February 1990	Assassination of Lassa Kaul (Director of Doordarshan)	Jammu and Kashmir	1	0	N/A	JKLF
15 April 1990	Murder and rape of Sarla Bhat	Jammu and Kashmir	1		Chargesheet filed. Verdict Pending.	Jammu and Kashmir Liberation Front (JKLF)
1 May 1990	Assassination of Sarwanand Koul Premi and his son.	Jammu and Kashmir	2	0	Unsolved	Islamist Militants (Group affiliation unknown)
21 May 1990	Assassination of Imam Mohammad Farooq Shah.	Jammu and Kashmir	1	0	N/A	Hizbul Mujahideen
30 May 1990	1990 Talwandi Bhai Village Massacre	Punjab	10	14	NA	Khalistan Commando Force
15 June 1991	1991 Patiala Killings	Punjab	19		NA	Khalistani Radicals (Group affiliation unknown)
21 May 1991	Assassination of Rajiv Gandhi	Tamil Nadu	15		N/A	Liberation Tigers of Tamil Eelam
15 June 1991	1991 June Train Shootings	Punjab	80	200	N/A	Khalistan Commando Force
6 October 1991	1991 Jalandhar-Amritsar Rail Line Attack	Punjab	8		N/A	Khalistani Radicals (Group affiliation unknown)
17 October 1991	1991 Rudrapur bombings	Uttarakhand	41	140	N/A	Bhindranwale Saffron Tigers Of Khalistan
8 November 1991	1991 Kalyan train bomb blast	Maharashta	12	65	Verdict given	Babbar Khalsa
19 December 1991	1991 Nirankari Bhawan Explosion	Punjab	11	25	N/A	Khalistani Radicals (Group affiliation unknown)
26 December 1991	1991 December Train Shootings	Punjab	50	70	N/A	Khalistan Commando Force
15 March 1992	1992 Ludhiana Massacre	Punjab	6	18	NA	Khalistani Radicals (Group affiliation unknown)
22 January 1993	Hijacking of Indian Airlines Flight 810	Lucknow-Delhi	0	0	Verdict Given	Satish Chandra Pandey (No group affiliaton)
12 March 1993	1993 Bombay bombings	Mumbai	257	700+	Verdict given	D-Company
16 March 1993	1993 Bowbazar bombing	Kolkata	69		Verdict given	Unknown
27 March 1993	Hijacking of Indian Airlines Flight 439	Delhi-Madras	0	0	Arrested	Unknown
9 April 1993	Palar blast	Karnataka	22	13	Verdict given	Veerapan Gang
10 April 1993	Hijacking of Boeing 737	Lucknow-Delhi	0	0	Arrested	Unknown
24-25 April 1993	Hijacking of Indian Airlines Flight 427	Srinagar-Jammu-Delhi	1	0	Terrorist was killed	Hizbul Mujahideen
8 August 1993	1993 bombing of RSS office in Chennai	Tamil Nadu	11	7	N/A	Islamist terrorists (Group affiliation unknown)
14 August 1993	1993 Kishtwar massacre	Jammu and Kashmir	16-17	0	N/A	Islamist terrorists (Group affiliation unknown)
11 September 1993	1993 Delhi Blast	Delhi	12		N/A	Khalistani Radicals (Group affiliation unknown)
5–6 December 1993	Trains and Ajmer	Rajasthan			N/A	Islamist terrorists (Group affiliation unknown)
18 March 1994	Assassination of Minister for Home and Speaker of J&k Assembly Wali Mohammad Itoo.	Jammu and Kashmir	1		Unsolved	Islamist terrorists (Group affiliation unknown)
29 March 1994	Assassination of Lt Gen E. W. Fernandes and other Indian Army officers.	Jammu and Kashmir	15		N/A	Jamaat-ul-Mujahideen
26 January 1995	Assassination attempt on Governor Lt Gen K. V. Krishna Rao.	Jammu and Kashmir	8		N/A	Islamist terrorists (Group affiliation unknown)
4 July 1995	1995 kidnapping of western tourists in Kashmir	Jammu and Kashmir	7	1	N/A	Harkat-ul-Ansar (Al-Faran)
31 August 1995	Murder of Beant Singh	Chandigarh	17		Suicide Attack (Verdict Given to other attacker)	Babbar KhalsaKhalistan Commando Force
21 May 1996	1996 Lajpat Nagar blast	New Delhi	13	38	N/A	Jammu Kashmir Liberation Front
22 May 1996	1996 Dausa blast	Rajasthan	14	37	N/A	Jammu Kashmir Liberation Front
30 December 1996	Brahmaputra Mail train bombing	Assam	33	150	N/A	Bodo Security Force
21 March 1997	1997 Sangrampora massacre	Jammu and Kashmir	7	0	Unsolved	Islamist terrorists (Group affiliation unknown)
25 January 1998	1998 Wandhama massacre	Jammu and Kashmir	23	0	N/A	Lashkar-e-Taiba Hizbul Mujahideen
14 February 1998	1998 Coimbatore bombings	Tamil Nadu	58	200+	Verdict given	Al Ummah
17 April 1998	1998 Prankote massacre	Jammu and Kashmir	29	0	Verdict given	Lashkar-e-Toiba Hizbul Mujahideen
19 June 1998	1998 Chapnari massacre	Jammu and Kashmir	26	0	Encountered and 1 arrested	Lashkar-e-Taiba Hizbul Mujahideen
3 August 1998	1998 Chamba massacre	Himachal Pradesh	35 (Hindus)	0	Arrested	Hizbul Mujahideen
24-31 December 1999	Hijacking of Indian Airlines Flight 814	Delhi-Kathmandu	1	0	3 terrorists released in exchange for hostages	Harkat-ul-Mujahideen

=== 2000–2009 ===
Date	Incidents & Description	Location	People Killed	Injured	Status of the Case	Perpetrators
20 March 2000	Chittisinghpura massacre	Jammu and Kashmir	35		Unsolved	Lashkar-e-Taiba (LeT) Hizbul Mujahideen
20 May 2000	Bagber massacre	Tripura	25		N/A	National Liberation Front of Tripura
May–July 2000	2000 Church bombings of South India	Karnataka, Goa and Andhra Pradesh	0		Verdict given	Deendar Anjuman
22 December 2000	2000 terrorist attack on Red Fort	Delhi	3	14	Verdict given	Lashkar-e-Taiba
9 February 2001	2001 Kot Charwal massacre	Jammu and Kashmir	15		N/A	Lashkar-e-Taiba
10 May - August 2001	2001 Kishtwar massacres (series of 4 massacres)	Jammu and Kashmir	45	5	N/A	Lashkar-e-Taiba
9 June 2001	Charar-e-Sharief mosque attack	Jammu and Kashmir	4	60	N/A	Unknown
1 October 2001	2001 Jammu and Kashmir legislative assembly car bombing	Jammu and Kashmir	38		N/A	Jaish-e-Mohammed
13 December 2001	2001 Indian Parliament attack	New Delhi	9	18	Verdict given	Jaish-e-Mohammed
22 January 2002	American Cultural Centre attack	Kolkata	5	20	Verdict given	Harkat-ul-Jihad al-Islami
21 March 2002	Assassination of Abdul Ghani Lone	Jammu and Kashmir	1	0	Unsolved	Lashkar-e-Taiba
13 May 2002	2002 Jaunpur train crash	Jaunpur	12	80	N/A	Student's Islamic Movement of India
14 May 2002	Kaluchak massacre	Jammu and Kashmir	34	47	N/A	Lashkar-e-Taiba
30 March 2002	2002 Raghunath temple attacks	Jammu	11	20	N/A	Lashkar-e-Taiba
13 July 2002	2002 Qasim Nagar massacre	Jammu and Kashmir	29		Arrests were made	Lashkar-e-Taiba
10 September 2002	Rafiganj train wreck	Bihar	200	150+	N/A	Communist Party of India (Marxist–Leninist) People's War
24 November 2002	2002 Raghunath temple attacks	Jammu	14	45	N/A	Lashkar-e-Taiba
6 December 2002	2002 Mumbai bus bombing	Mumbai	2	14	N/A	Unknown
21 December 2002	Kurnool train crash	Andhra Pradesh	20	80	N/A	Lashkar-e-Taiba
24 September 2002	Attack on Akshardham temple	Gujarat	31	80	Verdict given	Lashkar-e-Taiba
27 January 2003	January 2003 Mumbai bombing	Mumbai	1	28	N/A	Lashkar-e-Taiba
13 March 2003	March 2003 Mumbai bombing	Mumbai	10		N/A	Lashkar-e-Taiba
23 March 2003	2003 Nadimarg massacre	Pulwama district, Jammu and Kashmir	25	1	N/A	Lashkar-e-Taiba
14 August 2003	Kamalnagar massacre	Tripura	14		N/A	All Tripura Tiger Force
25 August 2003	August 2003 Mumbai bombings	Mumbai	52		N/A	Lashkar-e-Taiba
2 January 2004	Jammu railway station attack	Jammu	4	14	N/A	Lashkar-e-Taiba
15 August 2004	2004 Dhemaji school bombing	Assam	18	40	N/A	ULFA
2 October 2004	2004 Dimapur bombings	Dimapur, Nagaland	30	100	N/A	Islamic terrorists
22 May 2005	2005 Delhi Cinema Bombing	Delhi	3	50	NA	Khalistani Radicals (Group affiliation unknown)
5 July 2005	2005 Ayodhya attack	Ayodhya	6		N/A	Lashkar-e-Taiba
28 July 2005	2005 Jaunpur train bombing	N/A	13	50	N/A	Harkat-ul-Jihad al-Islami
29 October 2005	2005 Delhi bombings: Three powerful serial blasts in Delhi at different places	Delhi	70	250	N/A	Lashkar-e-Taiba
28 December 2005	2005 Indian Institute of Science shooting	Karnataka	1	4	N/A	Lashkar-e-Taiba
19 February 2006	2006 Ahmedabad railway station bombing	Gujarat	0	25	N/A	Lashkar-e-Taiba
7 March 2006	2006 Varanasi bombings: Three synchronized terrorist attacks in Varanasi in Shri Sankatmochan Mandir and Varanasi Cantonment Railway Station	Varanasi	28	101	N/A	Indian Mujahideen
30 April 2006	2006 Doda massacre	Jammu and Kashmir	57 (Hindus)		N/A	Lashkar-e-Taiba militants
9 June 2006	2006 Inter State Bus Terminus (ISBT) Bombing	Punjab	3	12	N/A	Khalistan Zindabad Force (KZF)
11 July 2006	2006 Mumbai train bombings: Series of 7 train bombing during the evening rush hour in Mumbai	Mumbai	209	714	N/A	Lashkar-e-Taiba
8 September 2006	2006 Malegaon bombings: Series of bomb blasts in the vicinity of a mosque in Malegaon, Maharashtra	Maharashtra	40	125	N/A	Students Islamic Movement of India
18 February 2007	2007 Samjhauta Express bombings	Haryana	70	50	N/A	Lashkar-e-Taiba Abhinav Bharat
18 May 2007	Mecca Masjid bombing	Hyderabad	16	100	N/A	Abhinav Bharat
25 August 2007	August 2007 Hyderabad bombings - Two blasts in Hyderabad's Lumbini park and Gokul Chat.	Hyderabad	42	54	verdict given	Harkat-ul-Jihad-al-Islami
11 October 2007	Ajmer Dargah bombing	Rajasthan	3	17	N/A	Abhinav Bharat
14 October 2007	2007 Ludhiana Blast	Ludhiana	6		N/A	Khalistani Radicals (Group affiliation unknown)
24 November 2007	A series of near-simultaneous explosions at courthouse complexes in the cities of Lucknow, Varanasi, and Faizabad	Uttar Pradesh	16	70	N/A	Indian Mujahideen
1 January 2008	Terror attack on CRPF camp in Rampur, Uttar Pradesh by Lashkar-e-Taiba,	Uttar Pradesh	8	5	N/A	Lashkar-e-Taiba
13 May 2008	Jaipur bombings: 9 bomb blasts along 6 areas in Jaipur	Jaipur	71	200	Verdict given	Indian Mujahideen
25 July 2008	2008 Bengaluru serial blasts: 8 low intensity bomb blasts in Bengaluru	Bengaluru	1	20	Arrests made	Lashkar-e-Taiba
26 July 2008	2008 Ahmedabad bombings: 17 serial bomb blasts in Ahmedabad	Ahmedabad	56	200	Arrests made	Indian Mujahideen Harkat-ul-Jihad-al-Islami
13 September 2008	13 September 2008 Delhi bombings: 5 bomb blasts in Delhi markets	Delhi	33	130		Indian Mujahideen
27 September 2008	27 September 2008 Delhi bombing: Bombings at Mehrauli area, 2 bomb blasts in Delhi flower market	Delhi	3	21		Unknown
29 September 2008	29 September 2008 western India bombings: 10 killed and 80 injured in bombings in Maharashtra (including Malegaon) and Gujarat bomb blasts	Maharashtra	10	80		Abhinav Bharat
1 October 2008	2008 Agartala bombings	Agartala	4	100		All-Tripura Tiger Force
21 October 2008	2008 Imphal bombing	Imphal	17	40+		Kangleipak Communist Party
30 October 2008	2008 Assam bombings	Assam	81	470		National Democratic Front of Bodoland
26 November 2008	2008 Mumbai attacks	Mumbai	171	300+	Verdict given	Lashkar-e-Taiba
1 January 2009	2009 Guwahati bombings	Assam	6	67		ULFA
6 April 2009	2009 Assam bombings	Assam	9	63		ULFA

=== 2010–2019 ===
Date	Incidents & Description	Location	People Killed	Injured	Status of the Case	Perpetrators
13 February 2010	2010 Pune bombing	Pune	17	54		Lashkar-e-Taiba & Indian Mujahideen
15 February 2010	Silda camp attack	West Bengal	28			Communist Party of India (Maoist)
6 April 2010	April 2010 Maoist attack in Dantewada	Chhattisgarh	84 (including 8 terrorists)	8		Communist Party of India (Maoist)
17 May 2010	2010 Dantewada bus bombing	Chhattisgarh	31-44	15		Communist Party of India (Maoist)
28 May 2010	Jnaneswari Express train derailment	West Bengal	148	200+		Communist Party of India (Maoist)
4 July 2010	Assault on T. J. Joseph	Kerala	0	1	Investigations ongoing, few perpetrators were convicted while others fled	Popular Front of India
7 December 2010	2010 Varanasi bombing	Varanasi	2	37		Indian Mujahideen
13 July 2011	2011 Mumbai bombings	Mumbai	26	130		Indian Mujahideen
7 September 2011	2011 Delhi bombing	New Delhi	15	74		Harkat-ul-Jihad-al-Islami
13 February 2012	2012 attacks on Israeli diplomats	New Delhi	0	4		Islamic Revolutionary Guard Corps
6 July 2012	Murder of ABVP member, N. Sachin Gopal	Kerala	1	0	A Special Investigation Team (SIT) was formed to investigate the case.	Popular Front of India
1 August 2012	2012 Pune bombings	Pune	0	1		Indian Mujahideen
21 February 2013	2013 Hyderabad blasts	Hyderabad	18	131		Indian Mujahideen
13 March 2013	March 2013 Srinagar attack	Jammu and Kashmir	7	10		Hizbul Mujahideen
17 April 2013	2013 Bengaluru blast	Bengaluru	0	16		Unknown
25 May 2013	2013 Naxal attack in Darbha valley	Sukma, Chhattisgarh	32	32		Communist Party of India (Maoist)
24 June 2013	June 2013 Srinagar attack	Jammu and Kashmir	8	19		Hizbul Mujahideen
7 July 2013	July 2013 Maoist attack in Dumka	Dumka, Jharkhand	2			Communist Party of India (Maoist)
7 July 2013	Bodh Gaya bombings	Bodh Gaya	0	5		Indian Mujahideen
27 October 2013	2013 Patna bombings	Patna	6	85		Indian Mujahideen
26 December 2013	2013 Jalpaiguri bombing	Jalpaiguri, West Bengal	5	5		Kamtapur Liberation Organisation
11 March 2014	2014 Chhattisgarh attack	Chhattisgarh	16	3		Communist Party of India (Maoist)
25 April 2014	Blast in Jharkhand	Jharkhand	8	4-5		Unknown
28 April 2014	Blast in Budgam District	Jammu and Kashmir	0	18		Unknown
1 May 2014	2014 Chennai train bombing	Chennai	1	14		Unknown
1 May 2014	May 2014 Assam violence	Assam	33			National Democratic Front of Bodoland
12 May 2014	Maoist blast in Gadchiroli District	Gadchiroli district, Maharashtra	7	2		Communist Party of India (Maoist)
23 December 2014	December 2014 Assam violence	Assam	85			National Democratic Front of Bodoland
28 December 2014	2014 Bengaluru bombing	Bengaluru	1	5		Unknown
20 March 2015	2015 Jammu attack	Jammu	6	10		Unknown
4–9 June 2015	2015 Manipur ambush	Chandel district, Manipur	176 (including 158 terrorists)	15	Surgical strike by Indian Armed Forces near India Myanmar border killing 156 terrorists.	National Socialist Council of Nagaland-K
27 July 2015	2015 Gurdaspur attack in Dina Nagar, Gurdaspur district	Gurdaspur district, Punjab	10	15		Unknown
2 January 2016	2016 Pathankot attack in Pathankot Air Force Station, Pathankot	Pathankot, Punjab	7			Unknown
25 June 2016	2016 Pampore attack	Pampore, Jammu and Kashmir	8	22		Unknown
5 August 2016	2016 Kokrajhar shooting.	Kokrajhar, Assam	14	15		National Democratic Front of Bodoland
18 September 2016	2016 Uri attack	Uri, Jammu & Kashmir	23	8	India claimed surgical strike on terrorist camps across Line of Control, Pakistan denied that a cross-border strike took place.	Lashkar-e-Taiba
3 October 2016	2016 Baramulla attack	Baramulla, Jammu & Kashmir	5			Unknown
6 October 2016	2016 Handwara attack at 30 Rashtriya Rifles camp	Handwara, Jammu & Kashmir				Unknown
29 November 2016	2016 Nagrota army base attack	Nagrota, Jammu & Kashmir	10			Unknown
7 March 2017	2017 Bhopal–Ujjain Passenger train bombing	Bhopal		10		Islamic State
24 April 2017	2017 Sukma attack	Sukma district, Chhattisgarh	26			Communist Party of India (Maoist)
11 July 2017	2017 Amarnath Yatra attack	Anantnag, Jammu & Kashmir	8	18		Unknown
10 February 2018	2018 Sunjuwan attack	Sunjuwan, Jammu and Kashmir	11	11		Unknown
13 March 2018	2018 Sukma attack	Sukma district, Chhattisgarh	9			Communist Party of India (Maoist)
14 February 2019	2019 Pulwama attack	Awantipora, Jammu & Kashmir	40	35	Air strikes by Indian Air Force on Pakistani Islamic militant group Jaish-e-Mohammed	Jaish-e-Mohammed
7 March 2019	2019 Jammu Bus stand grenade blast	Jammu	3	28-35	Arrest made of a teen aged student of 9th standard of a local school.	Unknown
9 April 2019	2019 Dantewada attack	Dantewada, Chhattisgarh	5			Communist Party of India (Maoist)
9 April 2019	2019 killing of RSS worker in Kishtwar	Kishtwar, Jammu and Kashmir	2		Curfew imposed in Kishtwar and adjoining areas	Unknown
1 May 2019	Gadchiroli Naxal bombing	Gadchiroli, Maharashtra	16		Unknown	Unknown
12 June 2019	June 2019 Kashmir attack	Awantipora, Jammu & Kashmir	5(+1)	4	Got away	Unknown

=== 2020–2029 ===
Date	Incidents & Description	Location	People Killed	Injured	Status of the Case	Perpetrators
21 March 2020	2020 Sukma Maoists attack	Sukma district, Chhattisgarh	17	15		Communist Party of India (Maoist)
3 April 2021	2021 Sukma–Bijapur attack	Sukma district, Chhattisgarh	22 (+9)	32		Communist Party of India (Maoist)
7 October 2021	2021 Srinagar School Shooting	Srinagar	2	0		Lashkar-e-Taiba affiliate TRF Group
1–2 January 2023	2023 Rajouri attacks	Rajouri, Jammu and Kashmir	7	12		Unknown
8 April 2023	2023 Elathur train arson	Elathur, Kozhikode district, Kerala	3		Unknown. Culprit is believed to be a lone wolf.	Unknown
26 April 2023	2023 Dantewada bombing	Dantewada District, Chhattisgarh	11 (10 Policemen and 1 driver)			Communist Party of India (Maoist)
29 October 2023	Ernakulam Jehovah's Witness Convention Center Blast	Kochi	3	36		Perpetrator is a former member of the Jehovah's Witness religion community.
1 March 2024	2024 Bengaluru Cafe bombing	Bengaluru	0	9	Chargesheet filed against four Islamic State members.	Islamic State
9 June 2024	2024 Reasi attack	Reasi, Jammu and Kashmir	9	41	Islamist terrorists attacked Hindu pilgrims returning from pilgrimage.	Lashkar-e-Taiba: The Resistance Front
22 April 2025	2025 Pahalgam attack	Pahalgam, Jammu and Kashmir	26	20	Terrorists fired on tourists killing more than 26 and injuring multiple civilians. Hindus were attacked while one Muslim tried to retaliate and got killed in the process.	Lashkar-e-Taiba: The Resistance Front
10 November 2025	2025 Delhi car explosion	Red Fort, Delhi	15	20+	Under Investigation	Ansar Ghazwat-ul-Hind

== Year, fatalities, and number of incidents ==
Terrorist incidents in India
Year	Number of incidents	Deaths	Injuries
2025	206	98	Not Fully Released
2024	279	165	~320
2023	274	144	~290
2022	291	162	344
2021	322	197	451
2020	448	258	490
2019	558	277	536
2018	748	350	540
2017	1000	470	702
2016	1025	467	788
2015	884	387	649
2014	860	490	776
2013	694	467	771
2012	611	264	651
2011	645	499	730
2010	663	812	660
2009	672	774	854
2008	534	824	1,759
2007	149	626	1,187
2006	167	722	2,138
2005	146	466	1,216
2004	108	334	949
2003	196	472	1,183
2002	184	599	1,186
2001	234	660	1,144
2000	180	671	761
1999	112	469	591
1998	61	398	411
1997	193	853	1,416
1996	213	569	952
1995	179	361	616
1994	107	389	405
1993	42	525	1,564
1992	237	1,152	917
1991	339	1,113	1,326
1990	349	907	1,042
1989	324	874	769
1988	358	966	1,033
1987	166	506	429
1986	96	340	163
1985	39	51	79
1984	159	195	364
1983	47	59	217
1982	13	64	102
1981	16	24	12
1980	10	17	13
1979	20	31	19
1978	0	0	0
1977	1	0	0
1976	1	0	0
1975	1	4	0
1974	0	0	0
1973	0	0	0
1972	1	0	0
1971	0	0	0
1970	0	0	0
Total	12,002	19,866	30,544

== See also ==
- Terrorism in India
- Insurgency in Jammu and Kashmir
- Insurgency in Northeast India
- Insurgency in Punjab
- Naxalite–Maoist insurgency
