= List of massacres in Jammu and Kashmir =

The human right abuses and some of the massacres in the history of Jammu and Kashmir are listed below. (Note: An incomplete list of the massacres...would begin thus...)

== 1865 ==
Dogra rule

1865 Zaldagar massacre

== 1931 ==
Dogra rule

- 1931 kashmir agitation

== 1947 ==
Partition of India

- 1947 Jammu massacres
- 1947-1948 Rajouri massacre
- 1947 Mirpur massacre

== 1980s ==
Kashmiri Muslims

- 1986 Kashmir riot

== 1990 ==
Indian security forces

- Gawakadal massacre
- Handwara massacre
- Zakoora and Tengpora massacre
- Hawal massacre
- 1990 Pazipora massacre

== 1991 ==
Indian security forces

- 1991 Chotta Bazaar massacre

== 1993 ==
Indian security forces

- Bijbehara massacre
- Sopore massacre
- 1993 Lal Chowk fire

Muslim militants

- 1993 Kishtwar massacre

== 1994 ==
Indian security forces

- Kupwara massacre

== 1995 ==
Terrorists

- 1995 kidnapping of western tourists in Jammu and Kashmir

== 1997 ==
Terrorists

- 1997 Sangrampora massacre

== 1998 ==
Terrorists

- 1998 Wandhama massacre
- 1998 Prankote massacre
- 1998 Chapnari massacre

== 2000 ==
Terrorists

- 2000 Amarnath pilgrimage massacre
- Chittisinghpura massacre

== 2001 ==
Terrorists

- 2001 Amarnath pilgrimage massacre
- 2001 Kishtwar massacre
- 2001 Kot Charwal massacre

== 2002 ==
Terrorists

- 2002 Amarnath pilgrimage massacre
- 2002 Qasim Nagar massacre
- 2002 Kaluchak massacre
- 2002 Raghunath temple attacks

== 2003 ==
Terrorists

- 2003 Nadimarg massacre

== 2004 ==
Terrorists

- 2004 Teli Katha massacre

== 2006 ==
Terrorists

- 2006 Doda massacre

== 2017 ==
Terrorists

- 2017 Amarnath Yatra attack

== 2019 ==
Terrorists

- 2019 Kulgam massacre

== 2025 ==
Terrorists

- 2025 Pahalgam attack

== See also ==
- Human rights abuses in Jammu and Kashmir
- Rape in Kashmir conflict
