= List of massacres in India =

A massacre is the deliberate slaughter of members of one group by one or more members of another more powerful group. A massacre may be indiscriminate or highly methodical in application. A massacre is a single event, though it may occur during the course of an extended military campaign or war. A massacre is separate from a battle (an event in which opposing sides fight), but may follow in its immediate aftermath, when one side has surrendered or lost the ability to fight, yet the victors persist in killing their opponents.

== Pre-colonial India ==
| Name/Place | Date | Location | Perpetrator | Deaths | Notes | Ref(s) |
|---|---|---|---|---|---|---|
| Siege of Chittorgarh (1303) | 1303 | Chittor, Guhila kingdom | Sultanate of Delhi | 30,000 Hindu | Alauddin Khalji ordered the massacre of 30,000 people of Chittor after besieging and capturing it, according to Amir Khusrau. | |
| Siege of Chittorgarh (1568) | February 1568 | Chittor Fort | Mughal Empire | 30,000 | Akbar ordered the general massacre of 30,000 non combatants in Chittor and took many as prisoners. | |
| Capture of Delhi (1398) | 1398 | Loni, Ghaziabad, Delhi Sultanate | Timurid Empire | 100,000 Indian captives | Before the Battle of Delhi, Timur the Lame saw his plunder and captured slaves reaching massive numbers. Fearing complications, he ordered his soldiers to kill all 100,000 captives to prevent a rebellion before the attack. Historical accounts are unclear, but an estimated million casualties on the Indian side, including slaves, civilians, and soldiers, is assumed. | |
| Battle of Ahmednagar | 1559-60 | Ahmadnagar Sultanate | Vijayanagara Empire Ahmadnagar Sultanate | Unknown | According to Firishta, the Vijayanagar army of Ram Raya allied with Bijapur laid waste to the Ahmednagar's country so thoroughly that from Parenda to Junnar and from Ahmednagar to Daulatabad, not a vestige of population was left. They also massacred and looted Muslims in Ahmednagar. During the siege of Ahmednagar Fort, Ali Adil Shah of Bijapur and Ibrahim Quli Qutb Shah of Golconda also laid waste to the adjacent territory. | |
| Khejarli massacre | 1730 | Khejarli | Kingdom of Marwar | 363 Bishnois | 363 Bishnois killed, tree harvesting halted and outlawed in the Khejarli | |
| Chhota Ghallughara | 1746 | Lahore | Mughal Empire | 3,000 Sikh prisoners | 7,000 Sikhs were killed in battle with armies of Diwan of Lahore. 3,000 were captured and executed in Lahore. | |
| Vadda Ghalughara | 1763 | Punjab | Durrani Empire | Est. 25,000–30,000 Sikhs | Perpetrated by Afghan Muslim forces of Ahmad Shah Durrani. | |

== Colonial India ==
| Name/Place | Date | Location | Deaths | Notes | Reference(s) |
|---|---|---|---|---|---|
| Red Fort, peepal tree massacre | 16 May 1857 | Delhi, Mughal Empire | ~ 40–52 Europeans | Bahadur Shah Zafar's palace servants and Indian soldiers executed the European civilians captured in the previous day's riots. | |
| Mutiny in Allahabad | 6 June 1857 | Allahabad, Company rule in India | ~ 50 Europeans | The 6th Regiment of Bengal Native Infantry Mutinied, killing their European officers, and looted the city. | |
| Siege of Cawnpore | 5–25 June 1857 | Kanpur, Company rule in India | ~ 1,000 | Europeans soldiers, merchants, engineers, their wives and children, along with the East India Company sepoys, who were either Christian or refused to join mutiny or join Nana Sahib forces | |
| Massacres by General Neill | 17 June–July 1857 | Allahabad, Kanpur and surrounding areas, Company rule in India | Thousands of Indian mutineers, suspected rebels and civilians | The massacres at Allahabad took place before the Bibighar massacre; the ones at Kanpur after it | |
| Satichaura Ghat massacre | 27 June 1857 | Kanpur, Company rule in India | ~ 200 British officers | Massacre by Nana Sahib's forces | |
| Bibighar massacre | 15 July 1857 | Kanpur, Company rule in India | ~ 200 British women and children | The victims were prisoners under Nana Sahib's forces. The massacre was carried out by a group of butchers, but who ordered it remains unclear. | |
| Kuka (Namdhari) massacre at Malerkotla | 17–18 January 1872 | Malerkotla, Punjab, British Raj | ~ 65 Kuka (Namdhari) Killed | Mr. Cowan (the Deputy Commissioner of Ludhiana) and Mr. Forsyth (the Commissioner of Ambala) ordered the Namdharis to be executed with cannons, without any trial, on 17 and 18 January 1872 respectively. | |
| Mangarh massacre | 17 November 1913 | Mangadh (now Gujarat-Rajasthan), British Raj | Claimed 1,500 tribals | Machine guns and canons were fired under the command of British officers Major S. Bailey and Captain E. Stoiley. R.E. Hamilton, a local political agent had played key role. About 900 more were captured. | |
| Jallianwala Bagh massacre | 13 April 1919 | Amritsar, Punjab, British Raj | 379–1,500 dead, ~1,100 Indians. | Reginald Edward Harry Dyer ordered a unit of the British Indian Army to open fire on a large meeting, taking place contrary to orders posted by Dyer and subsequent to a series of lynchings, rapes, arsons, and intimidation of local business people by anti-colonial protestors. | |
| Nankana massacre | 20 February 1921 | Nankana Sahib, Punjab, British Raj | 140–,260 Sikhs dead. 9 year old Darbara Singh was thrown alive on wood fire. | Mahant Narayan Das hired goons with swords, lathi and other weapons to massacre large peaceful protestors, who were protesting and wanted Gurdwara Reform Movement as Mahant did many practices like Hookah Smoking and making the place unholy with dancers. Eventually after much sacrifices Sikhs were successful in getting Gurdwara keys. | |
| Malabar rebellion | October 1921 | Malabar, Kerala, British Raj | 2,337–10,000 Hindus and Muslims (100,000 Hindus permanently migrated). | Khilafat Movement considered as main cause. | |
| Saka Panja Sahib massacre | October 30, 1922 | Panja Sahib, (now in Pakistan), British Raj | Claimed 2 lives of Sikhs named Bhai Karam Singh, Bhai Partap Singh and injured many who wanted to stop train of British and wanted to feed hungry Sikh prisoners while Mahants also aided Britishers and were regarded as British favorites. | | |
| Pal-Chitariya massacre | 7 March 1922 | Pal-Chitariya, Vijaynagar (now Gujarat), British Raj | Claimed 1200 tribals | The Mewar Bhil Corps led by a British officer, Major H.G. Sutton, fired on a gathering of tribals. | |
| Kohat riots | 9–11 September 1924 | Kohat, North-West Frontier Province, British Raj | 155 Hindus and Sikhs were killed (3,200 Hindus permanently migrated). | | |
| Calcutta riots | 15 July 1926 | Calcutta, Bengal, British Raj | 100+ dead, 200+ injured | A Muslim mob attacked a Hindu possession, later broken up by a mounted police charge on the Muslim rioters. | |
| United Provinces riots | 1923 to 1927 | United Provinces, British Raj | thousands dead and injured | 88 separate communal riots, including the: 4 September 1927 Nagpur riots, 3–7 May 1927 Lahore, November 1927 Lahore. | |
| Nagpur riots | 4 September 1927 | Nagpur, Bombay Presidency, British Raj | 22 killed, 100+ injured | | |
| Qissa Khwani massacre | 23 April 1930 | Peshawar, British Raj | 1 British Indian Army dispatch rider, and ~ 20– 230 protesters | After a British Indian Army despatch rider was killed and burned in the Bazaar two armoured cars were ordered to drive in and open fire on the protesters. | |
| Amko Simko massacre | 25 April 1939 | Simko Village, Sundergarh, Odisha British Raj | ~ 49 to 300 tribal peasants dead, ~ 50 injured | Crowd of tribals resisting the arrest of freedom fighter Nirmal Munda fired upon by troops of the British Indian army. | |
| Calcutta Riots | 15 August – 17 September 1946 | West Bengal, British Raj | 7,000 to 10,000 Hindus and Muslims. | Hindus and Muslims clashed during a protest by All-India Muslim League termed as Direct Action Day. | |
| Noakhali riots | September–October 1946 | East Bengal, British Raj | 200-285 Hindus | Muslim community attacked Hindu community as part of communal violence in India. Around 150,000 to 750,000 survivors were sheltered in temporary relief camps | |
| Punnapra-Vayalar uprising | March – October 1946 | Valayar, Travancore, Kerala British Raj | 400 | Travancore police attacked communists | |
| Bihar Massacre | 30 October – 7 November 1946 | Bihar, British Raj | 30,000 Muslims | After Noakhali riots tensions rose between Hindus and Muslims in Bihar province. Hindu mobs attacked Muslims killed them in thousands and burned down their property. | |
| Garhmukteshwar Anti-Muslim Violence | November 1946 | United Provinces, British Raj | at least 214 Muslims | Partition of the country into India and Pakistan was looming. | |
| Rawalpindi Massacres | March 1947 | Rawalpindi Division, British Raj | 7,000–8,000 Sikhs and Hindus | First instance of partition-related violence in Punjab to show clear signs of ethnic cleansing; around 80,000 Sikhs and Hindus were forcibly displaced from the Rawalpindi Division as a result of the violence. | |

== Independent India ==
| Name/Place | Date | Location | Deaths | Notes | Reference(s) |
|---|---|---|---|---|---|
| Partition of India | 1947 | Punjab, Delhi and Sindh,, Dominion of India and Dominion of Pakistan | ~ 200,000–2,000,000 people | The total death toll from the communal riots during the 1947 Partition of India is widely estimated by historians to be between 200,000 and 2 million people.For decades, the standard consensus among independent international historians—including authors like Yasmin Khan (The Great Partition) and Urvashi Butalia (The Other Side of Silence)—has been that the tragedy was roughly symmetrical.Recent quantitative research by independent demographers and historians has challenged the traditional 50–50 narrative. By tracking population deficits between the 1941 and 1951 censuses of British India, researchers have attempted to account for "missing" populations that cannot be explained by migration or natural birth/death rates. The Scale of Retaliation in the West: While the violence began intensely in the west (such as the Rawalpindi massacres targeting Hindus and Sikhs), the subsequent retaliatory actions in East Punjab, Delhi, Jammu, and surrounding princely states resulted in vast, dense numbers of casualties among fleeing Muslim populations. | |
| Jammu massacres | September to November 1947 | Jammu division, Jammu and Kashmir (princely state) | 237,000 Muslims 20,000+ Hindus and Sikhs | | |
| Kharsawan massacre | 1 January 1948 | Kharsawan State, Dominion of India | 100+ Adivasis | Massacre of Adivasis by Orissa Military Police in Kharsawan market ground. | |
| Hyderabad Massacres | 1948 | Hyderabad State | • Sunderlal Commitee Report :- 27,000–40,000 Hyderabadi Muslims killed • Responsible observers :- 200000 Muslims killed | Mass killings and rape of Muslims by Indian Armed Forces and Hindu local and national paramilitary groups. | |
| Matikhrü massacre | 6 September 1960 | Matikhrü (now in Phek district, Nagaland) | 9 civilians | The incident took place on September 6, 1960, when forces of the 16th Punjab Regiment of the Indian Army committed an act of mass murder against the village of Matikhrü. | |
| 1966 Hindu Sikh riots | 9 March 1966 | Delhi | 3 people died and around hundreds were injured, | Hindus and Sikhs battled in New Delhi's streets as a wave of violence over proposals for a Punjabi-speaking state spread. Following violence in Delhi stoning and casual violence also erupted in Ludhiana, Patiala, Jalandhar and in Panipat 3 congressmen were burnt alive including close associate of Bhagat Singh generally believed to be orchestrated by Jan Sangh who were anti of Punjabi speaking state. | |
| 1966 anti-cow slaughter agitation | 7 November 1966 | New Delhi | 7 killed | Hindu Sadhus and protestors killed by government | |
| Kilvenmani massacre | 25 December 1968 | Nagapattinam Tamil Nadu | 44 killed | Striking agricultural workers murdered by a gang, allegedly by their landlords. | |
| 1969 Gujarat riots | 1969 | Gujarat | Officially 660 total; 430 Muslims, 24 Hindus, 58 others/unidentified casualties | Hindu-Muslim riots. 1074 injured and over 48,000 lost their property. Unofficial reports claim as high as 2000 deaths. Muslim community suffered the majority of the losses. Out of the 512 deaths reported in the police complaints, 430 were Muslims. Property worth 42 million rupees destroyed during the riots, with Muslims losing 32 million worth of property. | |
| Turkman gate demolition and rioting | 1976 | Delhi | Officially 6, unofficially 15 killed by police (nearly all Muslims). | Killing of Delhi residents who refused to move residence. | |
| Marichjhapi massacre | 31 January 1979 | West Bengal | Official figures 2, Hindustan Times quotes 50 to 1000 Hindu refugees. Actual numbers estimated to be around 3000–5000. | Killing of refugees who came from East Pakistan. | |
| Moradabad riots | 1980 | Uttar Pradesh | Officially 400; unofficial estimates as high as 2500. | Started as a Muslim-Police conflict; later turned into a Hindu-Muslim riot. | |
| Mandai massacre | 1980 | Tripura | 255–500 Bengali Hindu refugees | | |
| Gua massacre | 8 September 1980 | Bihar | 11 Adivasis | Massacre of Adivasis by Bihar Military Police in a hospital. | |
| Khoirabari massacre | 7 February 1983 | Assam | 100-500 Bengalis | | |
| Nellie massacre | 18 February 1983 | Assam | 2,191 Bengalis, majorly Muslim | In Assam | |
| Train Passenger massacre I (part of the terrorist incidents in Punjab) | 23 February 1984 | Punjab | 11 Hindus | | |
| Operation Blue Star | 1–10 June 1984 | Amritsar, Punjab | 5,000 - 10,000 Sikh civilians died in Operation Blue star who came on martyrdom day of fifth Sikh Guru Guru Arjan Ji | The operation was conducted to expel Sikh rebels or militants who the state claimed to be fortifying the gurdwara with arms with external support from Pakistan and ISI. Many Sikhs consider this an attack on Sikh faith which, led to the assassination of Mrs Indira Gandhi, followed by one of the most brutal Sikh genocides in history. | |
| 1984 anti-Sikh riots | 31 October – 4 November 1984 | Primarily Delhi but also other parts of India | 8,000 - 17,000 Sikhs all over India | Series of riots after Assassination of Indira Gandhi. | |
| Hondh-Chillar massacre (part of the 1984 anti-Sikh riots) | 2 November 1984 | Hondh-Chillar, Haryana | 32 Sikhs | Rioting by Indian National Congress Party members after Assassination of Indira Gandhi. | |
| Daresi Ground massacre (part of the terrorist incidents in Punjab) | 28 March 1986 | Ludhiana, Punjab | 13 Hindus | | |
| Mallian massacre (part of the terrorist incidents in Punjab) | 29 March 1986 | Jalandhar, Punjab | 20 Hindu labourers | | |
| Bus Passenger massacre III (part of the terrorist incidents in Punjab) | 25 July 1986 | Mukatsar, Punjab | 15 Hindus | | |
| Bus Passenger massacre IV (part of the terrorist incidents in Punjab) | 30 November 1986 | Khudda, Punjab | 24 Hindus | | |
| Hashimpura massacre | 22 May 1987 | Meerut, Uttar Pradesh | 42-60 Muslims | | |
| Maliyana massacre | 23 May 1987 | Maliyana, Uttar Pradesh | 70-120 Muslims | | |
| Bus Passenger massacre V (part of the terrorist incidents in Punjab) | July 1987 | Fatehbad, Haryana | 80 Hindus | | |
| Jagdev Kalan massacre (part of the terrorist incidents in Punjab) | 6 August 1987 | Punjab | 13 Hindus | | |
| Rajbah massacre (part of the terrorist incidents in Punjab) | 31 March 1988 | Punjab | 18 Hindus belonging to 1 family | | |
| Train Passenger massacre II (part of the 1991 Punjab killings) | 15 June 1988 | Ludhiana, Punjab | 80 (mostly Hindus) | | |
| 1988 Karnataka Bidar riots | 14–16 September 1988 | Bidar | 6 Sikh students killed, 30 injured | Religious procession during Ganesh Chaturthi event and over demanding donations from Sikhs | |
| Train Passenger massacre III (part of the 1991 Punjab killings) | December 1988 | Ludhiana, Punjab | 49 (mostly Hindus) | | |
| 1989 Jammu anti-Sikh riots | 13 January 1989 | Jammu | 15 Sikhs killed, hundreds injured and property worth crores destroyed | Some Sikh pilgrims displaying Satwant Singh and Beant Singh posters during Guru Gobind Singh Jayanti | |
| Bhagalpur riots | October 1989 | Bhagalpur, Bihar | The total dead numbered around 1000, around 900 were Muslims; it was difficult to establish the religious identity of other victims. | Two false rumors about the killing of Hindu students started circulating: one rumor stated that nearly 200 Hindu university students had been killed by the Muslims, while another rumor stated that 31 Hindu boys had been murdered with their bodies dumped in a well at the Sanskrit College. | |
| Gawkadal massacre | 20 January 1990 | Srinagar, Jammu and Kashmir | 50 Kashmiri Protestors | Indian forces opened fire on Kashmiri protesters demonstrating against nocturnal raids, harassment, and alleged molestation of women in Srinagar's Chotta Bazaar locality. | |
| Ayodhya police firing on Karsevaks | 30 October 1990 and 2 November 1990 | Ayodhya, Uttar Pradesh | 16 Hindus (official figure) | Uttar Pradesh Chief Minister Mulayam Singh Yadav ordered the police to open fire on kar sevaks who reached Ayodhya. The dead bodies were allegedly thrown in Saryu river. | |
| 1991 anti-Tamil violence in Karnataka | 12–13 December 1991 | Mainly Bangalore, Mysore but also other parts of southern Karnataka | 18 Tamils | violent attacks originated in the demonstrations organised against the orders of the Cauvery Water Tribunal | |
| Bombay riots | December 1992 – January 1993 | Mumbai | 575 Muslims, 275 Hindus, 45 unknown and 5 others | Hindu-Muslim communal riot as an effect of Demolition of the Babri Masjid in Ayodhya. | |
| Sopore massacre | 6 January 1993 | Sopore, Jammu and Kashmir | 55 Kashmiri students | Security forces fired on procession. | |
| 1993 Kishtwar massacre | 14 August 1993 | Sarthal, Kishtwar, Jammu and Kashmir | 17 Hindu bus passengers | Militants segregated bus passengers into Hindus and Muslims and fired upon the Hindu group | |
| Bijbehara massacre | 22 October 1993 | Bijbehara, Jammu and Kashmir | 55 Kashmiri protestors | Indian armed forces fired upon unarmed Kashmiri protestors resulting in 55 civilian deaths. | |
| 1994 Mokokchung Massacre | 27 December 1994 | Mokokchung, Nagaland | 12 civilians | The incident took place when forces of the 10 Assam Rifles and the 12 Maratha Light Infantry of the Indian Army raided upon civilian populace of Nagaland's Mokokchung. | |
| 1995 Kohima massacre | 5 March 1995 | Kohima, Nagaland | 7 civilians | The incident was sparked off by a tyre burst from an army convoy's own vehicle leading the armed troops to fire at civilian populace after mistaking the sound of the tyre bursting for a bomb attack. | |
| 1997 Ramabai killings | 11 July 1997 | Ramabai colony, Mumbai | 10 people of the Dalit caste | A team of State Reserve Police Force members fired upon a crowd protesting the recent desecration of a statue of Dalit activist B. R. Ambedkar. | |
| Laxmanpur Bathe massacre | 1 December 1997 | Arwal district, Bihar | 58 people of the Dalit caste | Upper caste Ranvir Sena enter village at night and kill 58 Dalits, were sympathizers of the Maoists behind the killing of 37 upper caste men in Bara in Gaya district in 1992. | |
| 1998 Wandhama massacre | 25 January 1998 | Wandhama, Jammu and Kashmir | 23 Kashmiri Pandit | Unknown militants | |
| 1998 Prankote massacre | 17 April 1998 | Prankote, Udhampur, Jammu and Kashmir | 26 Hindus | | |
| 1998 Chapnari massacre | 19 June 1998 | Chapnari, Jammu and Kashmir | 25 Hindus | Allegedly perpetrated by Pakistani-backed insurgents. | |
| 1998 Chamba massacre | 3 August 1998 | Chamba district, Himachal Pradesh | 35 Hindus | Attack by Islamic militant group | |
| Manjolai labourers massacre | 23 July 1999 | Tirunelveli, Tamil Nadu | 17 Dalits | Forceful dispersion of protestors by police | |
| Chittisinghpura massacre | 20 March 2000 | Chittisinghpura, Anantnag district, Jammu and Kashmir | 36 Sikhs | Attack by Islamic militant group | |
| Gouranga Tilla massacre | 2000 | Tripura | 16 non-tribal Hindus | | |
| Bagber massacre | 20 May 2000 | Tripura | 25 non-tribal Hindus | | |
| Nanoor massacre | 27 July 2000 | West Bengal | 11 labourers | | |
| 2000 Amarnath pilgrimage massacre | 1 August 2000 | Jammu and Kashmir | 30 (Hindu pilgrims) | Attack by Muslim militants | |
| Bhojpur village massacre | 15 October 2000 | Bhojpur village, Bihar | 5 members of a lower caste (including a former village chief) were killed and another three were wounded in an attack. | 8 of the gunmen of the Akhilesh Singh Gang were arrested following the attack | |
| 2001 Aluva massacre | 6 January 2001 | Aluva, Kerala | 6 members of a family | | |
| 2001 Kishtwar massacres | May–August 2001 | Jammu and Kashmir | 43 Hindus | Series of attacks by Muslim militants | |
| Godhra massacre | 27 February 2002 | Godhra, Gujarat | 59 Hindus | Hindu passengers (mostly women and children) burnt alive and pelted with rocks. Different commissions were set up; one was by the Government of Gujarat to investigate the train burning spent 6 years going over the details of the case, and concluded that the fire was arson committed by a mob of 1000–2000 people. But some reports say the cause of the Godhra train fire is still uncertain. The court convicted 31 Muslims and another 63 were acquitted due to lack of evidence. | |
| 2002 Gujarat riots | 28 February 2002 | Ahmedabad | As per government reports, 790 Muslims and 254 Hindus killed, 223 reported missing, 2,500 injured. Unofficial estimates by groups like Human Rights Watch put the death toll to over 2,000. | Communal violence | |
| Gulbarg Society massacre (part of the 2002 Gujarat riots) | 28 February 2002 | Ahmedabad | 69 (mostly Muslims) | | |
| Naroda Patiya massacre (part of the 2002 Gujarat riots) | 28 February 2002 | Naroda, Ahmedabad | 97 Muslims | | |
| March 2002 Raghunath attack (part of 2002 Raghunath temple attacks) | 30 March 2002 | Jammu & Kashmir | 11 Hindus killed, 20 injured (Hindu devotees) | Muslim militant | |
| 2002 Qasim Nagar massacre | 13 July 2002 | Jammu and Kashmir | 29 Hindus | Terrorist attack | |
| Akshardham Temple attack | 24 September 2002 | Gujarat | 29 killed, 79 injured (Hindus) | Terrorist attack | |
| November 2002 Raghunath temple attack (part of 2002 Raghunath temple attacks) | 24 November 2002 | Jammu & Kashmir | 14 killed, 45 injured (mostly Hindu devotees) | Blamed on Lashkar-e-Taiba | |
| 2003 Nadimarg massacre | 23 March 2002 | Jammu and Kashmir | 24 Hindus | Terrorist attack | |
| 2002 Kaluchak massacre | 14 May 2002 | Jammu and Kashmir | 31 | Terrorist attack on a tourist bus and Army's family quarter. | |
| Marad massacre | May 2003 | Kerala | 8 killed, 58 injured - A. | | |
| Kamalnagar massacre | 14 August 2003 | Tripura | 14 killed | | |
| 2005 Delhi bombings | 29 October 2005 | Delhi | 62 killed, 210 | Terrorist attack on two markets two days before Diwali. | |
| 2006 Varanasi bombings | March 2006 | Uttar Pradesh | 28 killed, 101 injured - Devotees of Sankat Mochan Hanuman Temple targeted | Terrorist attack on a Hindu temple. | |
| 2006 Doda massacre | 30 April 2006 | Jammu & Kashmir | 35 Hindus | Terrorist attack | |
| 2007 Samjhauta Express bombings | 18 February 2007 | Diwana station | 68 people mostly Pakistani nationals and some Indians including some Railway employees | | |
| MV Kuber massacre | 23 November 2008 | Jakhau | 5 (4 missing) | Hijacking of a fishing trawler and the murder of the captain and crew. | |
| 2008 Mumbai attacks | 26 November 2008 | Mumbai | Over 164 killed, over 600 injured | 11 coordinated attacks by proven Pakistani terrorists; casualties include people of various nationalities, and Israeli victims were reportedly tortured before being killed. | |
| April 2010 Maoist attack in Dantewada | 6 April 2010 | Chhattisgarh | 76 | Maoist militant ambushed CRPF | |
| 2010 Dantewada bus bombing | 17 May 2010 | Chhattisgarh | 44 | Maoist militant attacked a civilian bus. | |
| 2012 Assam violence | July 2012 | Assam | 77 | Racial sentiments of the majority Assamese and Bodo community towards the local Bengali speaking Bangladeshi Muslim community leads to several attempts to deport the minority Bengali Muslims to Bangladesh forcefully, thus with a protest in defence from the other party, Communal violence broke out between Assamese, Bodos (Tribal, Christian, and Hindu faith) and Bengali speaking Bangladeshi Muslims. | |
| 2013 Naxal attack in Darbha valley | 25 May 2013 | Darbha Valley, Sukma district, Chhattisgarh | 28 | 28 people from a Congress Party motorcade | |
| 2013 Muzaffarnagar riots | 25 August 2013 – 17 September 2013 | Muzaffarnagar district, Uttar Pradesh | 42 Muslims and 20 Hindus killed and 93 injured | Eve teasing of Hindu Girls, murder of a Muslim boy, then public lynching of the murderers (two Hindu boys) triggered communal riot between the Hindu and the Muslim community. | |
| 2017 Amarnath Yatra attack | 10 July 2017 | Anantnag district, Jammu and Kashmir | 8 Hindu pilgrims | A bus carrying Hindu pilgrims of Amarnath Yatra was attacked by Lashkar-e-Taiba, resulting in deaths of 8 pilgrims. | |
| 2017 Northern India riots | 25-26 August 2017 | Panjab, Haryana, Chandigarh district, Northern India | 41+ killed and 300+ injured | 546 Arrested, Nearly 1000 Detained, Caused by Rape conviction of Gurmeet Ram Rahim Singh, Charged Honeypreet Insan, Rioting and arson | |
| 2020 Delhi riots | 23 February 2020 – 1 March 2020 | North East Delhi | 53 killed and 200+ injured, both Hindus and Muslims | 2,200 arrested (including detained). Caused by clashes between pro-CAA mobs and anti-CAA mobs. | |
| 2021 Nagaland killings | 4 December 2021 | Oting, Mon district, Nagaland | 13 killed | Ethnic clashes | |
| 2023 Manipur violence | 3 May 2023 | Manipur | 181+ killed and 310+ injured | Caused by ethnic tensions between Meitei and Kuki-Zomi | |
| 2023 Haryana riots | 31 July 2023 | Nuh district, Haryana | 6 killed - 5 Hindus (two police officers, three pilgrims), 1 Muslim and 200+ injured | 116 arrested. Organized Muslim mob attacked Hindu religious procession. | |
| 2025 Pahalgam attack | 22 April 2025 | Pahalgam, Jammu and Kashmir | 26 killed - 24 Hindus, 1 Christian, 1 Muslim; 20 injured | Muslim militants targeted Hindu tourists | |

== See also ==
- Religious violence in India
  - Violence against Muslims in India
  - Madhe Sahaba Agitation
  - Violence against Christians in India
  - Persecution of Hindus
- Caste-related violence in India
- List of wars involving India
  - List of battles of Rajasthan
- List of riots in India
  - 1925 Indian riots
  - List of riots in Mumbai
- Terrorism in India
  - List of terrorist incidents in India
  - List of massacres in Jammu and Kashmir
