= List of terrorist incidents in Jammu and Kashmir =

Separatist militant insurgency in Kashmir since 1989 has caused several terrorist attacks and incidents within the union territory of Jammu and Kashmir.

Security personnel deaths	6413
Civilian deaths	14930
Militant deaths	23386
Total	44729
Data from Ministry of Home Affairs

== List ==
Year	Date	Incident	Perpetrators	Deaths	Ref	State government	Central government
1989	14 September	Assassination of BJP leader and Lawyer Tika Lal Taploo.	Anti-Pandit militants	1		Farooq Abdullah (JKNC)	Rajiv Gandhi (INC)
1989	4 November	Assassination of retired Judge Nilkanth Ganjoo.	JKLF	1		Farooq Abdullah (JKNC)	Rajiv Gandhi (INC)
1990	13 February	Assassination of Lassa Kaul (Director of Doordarshan)	Anti-Pandit militants	1		Farooq Abdullah (JKNC)	V. P. Singh (Janata Dal)
1990	6 April	Assassination of CEO of Hindustan Machine Tools H. L. Khera.	JKLF	2		Farooq Abdullah (JKNC)	V. P. Singh (Janata Dal)
1990	6 April	Assassination of Vice Chancellor of University of Kashmir, Mushir-u-Haq.				Farooq Abdullah (JKNC)	V. P. Singh (Janata Dal)
1990	1 May	Assassination of Sarwanand Koul Premi and his son.	Anti-Pandit militants	2		Farooq Abdullah (JKNC)	V. P. Singh (Janata Dal)
1990	21 May	Assassination of Imam Mohammad Farooq Shah.	Hizbul Mujahideen	1		Farooq Abdullah (JKNC)	V. P. Singh (Janata Dal)
1990–1991		Exodus of Kashmiri Hindus	Anti-Hindu and Anti India militants	217-228		Dissolved (Jagmohan Malhotra)	Chandra Shekhar (SJPR) P. V. Narasimha Rao (INC)
1994	29 March	Assassination of Lt Gen E. W. Fernandes and other Indian Army officers.	Jamaat-ul-Mujahideen	15			
1994	18 March	Assassination of Minister for Home and Speaker of J&k Assembly Wali Mohammad Itoo.		1		Dissolved (Gen K. V. Krishna Rao)	P. V. Narasimha Rao (INC)
1995	26 January	Assassination attempt on Governor Lt Gen K. V. Krishna Rao.	Hizbul Mujahideen Lashkar-e-Taiba	8		Dissolved (Gen K. V. Krishna Rao)	P. V. Narasimha Rao (INC)
1995	20 July	Bomb Explosion in Jammu	Hizbul Mujahideen Lashkar-e-Taiba	20		Dissolved (Gen K. V. Krishna Rao)	P. V. Narasimha Rao (INC)
1998	26 January	Wandhama massacre	Hizbul Mujahideen Lashkar-e-Taiba	23		Farooq Abdullah (JKNC)	Inder Kumar Gujral (INC)
1998	17 April	Prankote massacre	Hizbul Mujahideen Lashkar-e-Taiba	29		Farooq Abdullah (JKNC)	Atal Bihari Vajpayee (BJP)
1998	21 April	Thub Village massacre	Hizbul Mujahideen Lashkar-e-Taiba	13		Farooq Abdullah (JKNC)	Atal Bihari Vajpayee (BJP)
1998	19 June	Chapnari massacre	Hizbul Mujahideen Lashkar-e-Taiba	25		Farooq Abdullah (JKNC)	Atal Bihari Vajpayee (BJP)
1998	3 August	Chamba massacre	Hizbul Mujahideen Lashkar-e-Taiba	35		Farooq Abdullah (JKNC)	Atal Bihari Vajpayee (BJP)
1999	7 September	Assassination of BJP Candidate Haider Noorani		1		Farooq Abdullah (JKNC)	Atal Bihari Vajpayee (BJP)
1999	3 November	Suicide attack at Badami Bagh cantonment		10		Farooq Abdullah (JKNC)	Atal Bihari Vajpayee (BJP)
1999	24 December	Suicide bomber attack on JnK Special Operations group police officers	Lashkar-e-Taiba	12		Farooq Abdullah (JKNC)	Atal Bihari Vajpayee (BJP)
2000	7 January	Attack on the Meteorological Center, Srinagar.		4		Farooq Abdullah (JKNC)	Atal Bihari Vajpayee (BJP)
2000	20 March	Chittisinghpura massacre	Lashkar-e-Taiba	35		Farooq Abdullah (JKNC)	Atal Bihari Vajpayee (BJP)
2000	15 May	Assassination of Minister for Power, Gulam Hasan Bhat	Hizbul Mujahideen	5		Farooq Abdullah (JKNC)	Atal Bihari Vajpayee (BJP)
2000	August	2000 Amarnath pilgrimage massacre		62		Farooq Abdullah (JKNC)	Atal Bihari Vajpayee (BJP)
2000	3 November	Assassination of Aga Syed Mehdi in a landmine explosion		6		Farooq Abdullah (JKNC)	Atal Bihari Vajpayee (BJP)
2000	25 December	Attack on Army HQ Badami Bagh, Srinagar		9		Farooq Abdullah (JKNC)	Atal Bihari Vajpayee (BJP)
2001	9 February	Suicide bomber attack on JnK police control room	Al-Umar-Mujahideen	12		Farooq Abdullah (JKNC)	Atal Bihari Vajpayee (BJP)
2001	10 February	2001 Kot Charwal massacre	Lashkar-e-Taiba	15		Farooq Abdullah (JKNC)	Atal Bihari Vajpayee (BJP)
2001	2 March	Ambush on police personnel in Rajouri		17		Farooq Abdullah (JKNC)	Atal Bihari Vajpayee (BJP)
2001	8 June	Grenade explosion in Charar-e-Sharief shrine.		4		Farooq Abdullah (JKNC)	Atal Bihari Vajpayee (BJP)
2001	20 July	Amarnath Massacre		8		Farooq Abdullah (JKNC)	Atal Bihari Vajpayee (BJP)
2001	21 July	Doda Massacre		16		Farooq Abdullah (JKNC)	Atal Bihari Vajpayee (BJP)
2001	2-3 August	2001 Kishtwar massacre	Lashkar-e-Taiba	15		Farooq Abdullah (JKNC)	Atal Bihari Vajpayee (BJP)
2001	7 August	Jammu Railway Station shootout		13		Farooq Abdullah (JKNC)	Atal Bihari Vajpayee (BJP)
2001	29 August	Anantnag bus attack		9		Farooq Abdullah (JKNC)	Atal Bihari Vajpayee (BJP)
2001	1 October	Jammu and Kashmir Legislative Assembly car bombing	Jaish-e-Mohammed	36		Farooq Abdullah (JKNC)	Atal Bihari Vajpayee (BJP)
2002	20 January	Poonch massacre	Lashkar-e-Taiba	11		Farooq Abdullah (JKNC)	Atal Bihari Vajpayee (BJP)
2002	30 March	First Raghunath temple attacks	Lashkar-e-Taiba	11		Farooq Abdullah (JKNC)	Atal Bihari Vajpayee (BJP)
2002	14 May	2002 Kaluchak massacre	Lashkar-e-Taiba	31		Farooq Abdullah (JKNC)	Atal Bihari Vajpayee (BJP)
2002	21 March	Assassination of Abdul Ghani Lone	Lashkar-e-Taiba	1		Farooq Abdullah (JKNC)	Atal Bihari Vajpayee (BJP)
2002	13 July	2002 Qasim Nagar massacre	Lashkar-e-Taiba	25		Farooq Abdullah (JKNC)	Atal Bihari Vajpayee (BJP)
2002	6 August	2002 Amarnath pilgrimage massacre	Lashkar-e-Taiba	11		Farooq Abdullah (JKNC)	Atal Bihari Vajpayee (BJP)
2002	11 September	Assassination of Mushtaq Lone, State Law Minister	Lashkar-e-Taiba	3		Mufti Mohammad Sayeed (JKPDP)	Atal Bihari Vajpayee (BJP)
2002	11 November	IED blast on the Jammu Srinagar national highway		8		Mufti Mohammad Sayeed (JKPDP)	Atal Bihari Vajpayee (BJP)
2002	22 November	IED blast in Srinagar	Lashkar-e-Taiba	6		Mufti Mohammad Sayeed (JKPDP)	Atal Bihari Vajpayee (BJP)
2002	23 November	IED blast at Lower Munda on the Jammu-Srinagar National Highway.		19		Mufti Mohammad Sayeed (JKPDP)	Atal Bihari Vajpayee (BJP)
2002	24 November	Secoind Raghunath temple attacks	Lashkar-e-Taiba	14		Mufti Mohammad Sayeed (JKPDP)	Atal Bihari Vajpayee (BJP)
2002	5 December	Assassination of Ghulam Mohiuddin Lone, brother of Mushtaq Lone.		1		Mufti Mohammad Sayeed (JKPDP)	Atal Bihari Vajpayee (BJP)
2002	20 December	Assassination of Abdul Aziz Mir		1		Mufti Mohammad Sayeed (JKPDP)	Atal Bihari Vajpayee (BJP)
2003	28 January	Assassination of Farooq Ahmed Kuchchay, NC politician	Hizbul Mujahideen	2		Mufti Mohammad Sayeed (JKPDP)	Atal Bihari Vajpayee (BJP)
2003	14 March	Suicide attack on Muharram procession in Poonch		4		Mufti Mohammad Sayeed (JKPDP)	Atal Bihari Vajpayee (BJP)
2003	16 March	Attack on remote police post		11		Mufti Mohammad Sayeed (JKPDP)	Atal Bihari Vajpayee (BJP)
2003	23 March	Nadimarg massacre	Lashkar-e-Taiba	24		Mufti Mohammad Sayeed (JKPDP)	Atal Bihari Vajpayee (BJP)
2003	22 April	Landmine blast in Udhampur		6		Mufti Mohammad Sayeed (JKPDP)	Atal Bihari Vajpayee (BJP)
2003	19 May	Massacre in form of beheading in Rajouri	Jaish-e-Mohammed	6		Mufti Mohammad Sayeed (JKPDP)	Atal Bihari Vajpayee (BJP)
2003	26 May	Ambush at the house of a Village Defence Committee member		5		Mufti Mohammad Sayeed (JKPDP)	Atal Bihari Vajpayee (BJP)
2003	28 June	Suicide attack at Sunjwan military base		12		Mufti Mohammad Sayeed (JKPDP)	Atal Bihari Vajpayee (BJP)
2003	22 July	Suicide attack at the Akhnoor army base, killing one Brigadier		8		Mufti Mohammad Sayeed (JKPDP)	Atal Bihari Vajpayee (BJP)
2003	13 September	Ambush on the car of political leader Mohammad Yusuf Parray		3		Mufti Mohammad Sayeed (JKPDP)	Atal Bihari Vajpayee (BJP)
2004	2 January	Suicide attack at the Jammu Railway Station		4		Mufti Mohammad Sayeed (JKPDP)	Atal Bihari Vajpayee (BJP)
2004	3 March	Suicide attack at the Court complex in Jammu		7		Mufti Mohammad Sayeed (JKPDP)	Atal Bihari Vajpayee (BJP)
2004	9 March	Suicide attack at the PIB of the GOI		2		Mufti Mohammad Sayeed (JKPDP)	Atal Bihari Vajpayee (BJP)
2004	9 March	Suicide attack on Directorate of Information of the Govt of JnK				Mufti Mohammad Sayeed (JKPDP)	Atal Bihari Vajpayee (BJP)
2004	8 April	Attack at a PDP political rally in Uri		11		Mufti Mohammad Sayeed (JKPDP)	Atal Bihari Vajpayee (BJP)
2004	23 May	IED explosion at the Jammu-Srinagar Highway		30		Mufti Mohammad Sayeed (JKPDP)	Manmohan Singh (INC)
2004	26 June	Terrorist attack in Surankote		12		Mufti Mohammad Sayeed (JKPDP)	Manmohan Singh (INC)
2004	2 July	Attack on the convoy of MP, Choudhury Lal Singh		6		Mufti Mohammad Sayeed (JKPDP)	Manmohan Singh (INC)
2004	19 July	Assassination attempt on Deputy Chief Minister Mangat Ram Sharma		6		Mufti Mohammad Sayeed (JKPDP)	Manmohan Singh (INC)
2004	28 July	Overnight gunfight at the paramilitary base on the banks of Dal lake		5		Mufti Mohammad Sayeed (JKPDP)	Manmohan Singh (INC)
2004	4 August	Ambush at CRPF camp		9		Mufti Mohammad Sayeed (JKPDP)	Manmohan Singh (INC)
2004	5 December	IED explosion in Pulwama		10		Mufti Mohammad Sayeed (JKPDP)	Manmohan Singh (INC)
2005	7 January	Suicide attack on Income tax office, Srinagar		3-5		Mufti Mohammad Sayeed (JKPDP)	Manmohan Singh (INC)
2005	24 February	Suicide attack at Divisional Commissioners office		6		Mufti Mohammad Sayeed (JKPDP)	Manmohan Singh (INC)
2005	12 May	Grenade attack in a school in Srinagar		2		Mufti Mohammad Sayeed (JKPDP)	Manmohan Singh (INC)
2005	13 June	Explosives-laden car detonates in Pulwama		13		Mufti Mohammad Sayeed (JKPDP)	Manmohan Singh (INC)
2005	24 June	Bus boarded by security personnel attacked by bomb in Srinagar		9		Mufti Mohammad Sayeed (JKPDP)	Manmohan Singh (INC)
2005	19 July	Attack at a village in Udhampur	Lashkar-e-Taiba	6		Mufti Mohammad Sayeed (JKPDP)	Manmohan Singh (INC)
2005	20 July	Suicide attack on Army vehicle in Srinagar		5		Mufti Mohammad Sayeed (JKPDP)	Manmohan Singh (INC)
2005	9 September	3 Families attacked in Udhampur		6		Mufti Mohammad Sayeed (JKPDP)	Manmohan Singh (INC)
2005	10 September	Attack on an Army convoy on the Srinagar-Jammu National Highway		5		Mufti Mohammad Sayeed (JKPDP)	Manmohan Singh (INC)
2005	10 October	Four families attacked in Rajouri	Hizbul Mujahideen	10		Mufti Mohammad Sayeed (JKPDP)	Manmohan Singh (INC)
2005	18 October	Assassination of Dr. Ghulam Nabi Lone, Minister for Education	Islamic Front	4		Mufti Mohammad Sayeed (JKPDP)	Manmohan Singh (INC)
2005	2 November	Suicide attack near the residence of outgoing CM Mufti Md Sayeed		10		Mufti Mohammad Sayeed (JKPDP)	Manmohan Singh (INC)
2005	14 November	Suicide attack at a business hub in Srinagar	Islamic Front	4		Ghulam Nabi Azad (INC)	Manmohan Singh (INC)
2005	15 November	Assassination attempt on PDP leader Ghulam Hassan Mir		3-6		Ghulam Nabi Azad (INC)	Manmohan Singh (INC)
2005	16 November	Assassination attempt on Minister Usman Majeed		4		Ghulam Nabi Azad (INC)	Manmohan Singh (INC)
2006	23 January	Gunfight with special operations group		4		Ghulam Nabi Azad (INC)	Manmohan Singh (INC)
2006	9 April	Terrorists kill a family of 3 in Udhampur		3		Ghulam Nabi Azad (INC)	Manmohan Singh (INC)
2006	14 April	Serial grenade blasts in Srinagar		5		Ghulam Nabi Azad (INC)	Manmohan Singh (INC)
2006	1 May	Doda massacre	Lashkar-e-Taiba	57		Ghulam Nabi Azad (INC)	Manmohan Singh (INC)
2006	21 May	Attack on the Rally of CM Ghulam Nabi Azad	Lashkar-e-Taiba	6-7		Ghulam Nabi Azad (INC)	Manmohan Singh (INC)
2006	25 May	Grenade attack in Srinagar		8		Ghulam Nabi Azad (INC)	Manmohan Singh (INC)
2006	12 June	Attack on Laborers in Anantnag		9		Ghulam Nabi Azad (INC)	Manmohan Singh (INC)
2006	8 July	Assassination of Ghulam Nabi Dar, NC leader in Kulgam		5		Ghulam Nabi Azad (INC)	Manmohan Singh (INC)
2006	11 July	Grenade attack in Srinagar	Lashkar-e-Taiba	8		Ghulam Nabi Azad (INC)	Manmohan Singh (INC)
2006	10 November	Grenade attack in Pulwama		6		Ghulam Nabi Azad (INC)	Manmohan Singh (INC)
2007	8 February	Ambush on Security Patrol in Pulwama		5		Ghulam Nabi Azad (INC)	Manmohan Singh (INC)
2007	30 March	Attack on laborers in Rajouri		5		Ghulam Nabi Azad (INC)	Manmohan Singh (INC)
2007	29 July	Attack on a civilian bus near Shalimar Garden		6		Ghulam Nabi Azad (INC)	Manmohan Singh (INC)
2007	17 August	IED blast near Security forces in Awantipora		5		Ghulam Nabi Azad (INC)	Manmohan Singh (INC)
2007	11 October	IED blast in Baramullah	Hizbul Mujahideen	7		Ghulam Nabi Azad (INC)	Manmohan Singh (INC)
2008	13 June	Ambush on Army personnel	Lashkar-e-Taiba	5		Ghulam Nabi Azad (INC)	Manmohan Singh (INC)
2008	4 July	Ambush on Army personnel in Kupwara		5		Ghulam Nabi Azad (INC)	Manmohan Singh (INC)
2008	19 July	IED blast in an Army bus in Srinagar	Hizbul Mujahideen	10		Dissolved (Narinder Nath Vohra)	Manmohan Singh (INC)
2008	24 July	Grenade attack in Srinagar		5		Dissolved (Narinder Nath Vohra)	Manmohan Singh (INC)
2008	24 July	Attack on the house of a surrendered militant	Hizbul Mujahideen	4		Dissolved (Narinder Nath Vohra)	Manmohan Singh (INC)
2008	27 August	Suicide attack in Kenachak		11		Dissolved (Narinder Nath Vohra)	Manmohan Singh (INC)
2009	21 April	IED blast in Poonch		5		Omar Abdullah (JKNC)	Manmohan Singh (INC)
2009	12 September	IED blast in Central Jail in Srinagar		3		Omar Abdullah (JKNC)	Manmohan Singh (INC)
2009	30 December	Shootout on CRPF vehicles	Hizbul Mujahideen	4		Omar Abdullah (JKNC)	Manmohan Singh (INC)
2010	16 March	Attack on civilians in Srinagar		6		Omar Abdullah (JKNC)	Manmohan Singh (INC)
2013	24 June	Ambush on Army personnel in Srinagar	Hizbul Mujahideen	8		Omar Abdullah (JKNC)	Manmohan Singh (INC)
2013	26 September	Twin suicide attacks in Kathua		13		Omar Abdullah (JKNC)	Manmohan Singh (INC)
2014	28 March	Truck Hijacking in Kathua	Lashkar-e-Taiba	6		Omar Abdullah (JKNC)	Manmohan Singh (INC)
2014	7 April	Landmine explosion in Baranda Mor	Lashkar-e-Taiba	3		Omar Abdullah (JKNC)	Manmohan Singh (INC)
2014	13 August	Attack in Pulwama before new Prime Minister's visit		3		Omar Abdullah (JKNC)	Narendra Modi (BJP)
2014	27 November	Suicide attack in Arnia	Lashkar-e-Taiba	10		Omar Abdullah (JKNC)	Narendra Modi (BJP)
2014	5 December	Suicide attack on Army personnel in Uri		17		Omar Abdullah (JKNC)	Narendra Modi (BJP)
2015	20 March	Suicide attack in a Kathua police station		6		Dissolved (Narinder Nath Vohra)	Narendra Modi (BJP)
2015	6 April	A militant attack in Shopian District		3		Mehbooba Mufti (JKPDP)	Narendra Modi (BJP)
2016	2 January	2016 Pathankot Airbase attack	Jaish-e-Mohammed	12		Mehbooba Mufti (JKPDP)	Narendra Modi (BJP)
2016	17 August	Ambush on Military convoy in Baramullah		3		Mehbooba Mufti (JKPDP)	Narendra Modi (BJP)
2016	18 September	2016 Uri attack	Jaish-e-Mohammed	24		Mehbooba Mufti (JKPDP)	Narendra Modi (BJP)
2016	29 November	Suicide attack on Military personnel in Nagrota		7		Mehbooba Mufti (JKPDP)	Narendra Modi (BJP)
2017	23 February	Attack on a Patrol party in Shopian		4		Mehbooba Mufti (JKPDP)	Narendra Modi (BJP)
2017	1 May	Ambush on a Bank Van in Kulgam		7		Mehbooba Mufti (JKPDP)	Narendra Modi (BJP)
2017	16 June	Ambush on Military convoy in Anantnag	Lashkar-e-Taiba	6		Mehbooba Mufti (JKPDP)	Narendra Modi (BJP)
2017	10 July	2017 Amarnath Yatra massacre		8		Mehbooba Mufti (JKPDP)	Narendra Modi (BJP)
2017	26 August	Suicide attack on Security forces in Pulwama		8		Mehbooba Mufti (JKPDP)	Narendra Modi (BJP)
2017	21 September	Assassination attempt on PDP leader Naeem Akhtar	Hizbul Mujahideen	3		Mehbooba Mufti (JKPDP)	Narendra Modi (BJP)
2018	6 January	IED blast in Sopore		4		Mehbooba Mufti (JKPDP)	Narendra Modi (BJP)
2018	10 February	Suicide attack on Sunjuwan Military Station	People's Anti-Fascist Front	9		Mehbooba Mufti (JKPDP)	Narendra Modi (BJP)
2018	29 August	Militant attack at Arhama in Shopian District		4		Dissolved (Satya Pal Malik)	Narendra Modi (BJP)
2018	21 October	Attack at Laroo village in Kulgam		15		Dissolved (Satya Pal Malik)	Narendra Modi (BJP)
2019	14 February	2019 Pulwama attack	Jaish-e-Mohammed	41		Dissolved (Satya Pal Malik)	Narendra Modi (BJP)
2019	12 June	Ambush on Security forces in a school in Anantnag	Al-Umar-Mujahideen	5		Dissolved (Satya Pal Malik)	Narendra Modi (BJP)
2019	29 October	Attack on Bengali laboureres		5		Dissolved (Satya Pal Malik)	Narendra Modi (BJP)
2020	4 May	Attack on CRPF patrol		4		Dissolved (Satya Pal Malik)	Narendra Modi (BJP)
2020	8 July	Assassination of BJP leader Wasim Ahmad Bari		3		G. C. Murmu	Narendra Modi (BJP)
2020	29 October	Attack on BJP workers	The Resistance Front	3		Manoj Sinha	Narendra Modi (BJP)
2021	12 December	Ambush on police vehicle in Srinagar	Jaish-e-Mohammed	3		Manoj Sinha	Narendra Modi (BJP)
2022	11 August	Foiled suicide attack in Rajouri	People's Anti-Fascist Front	5		Manoj Sinha	Narendra Modi (BJP)
2023	1 January	Attack on civilians in Rajouri		4		Manoj Sinha	Narendra Modi (BJP)
2023	20 April	Ambush on army vehicle in Poonch	People's Anti-Fascist Front	5		Manoj Sinha	Narendra Modi (BJP)
2023	5 May	IED blast in Rajouri	People's Anti-Fascist Front	5		Manoj Sinha	Narendra Modi (BJP)
2023	21 December	Ambush on Army vehicle		5		Manoj Sinha	Narendra Modi (BJP)
2024	9 June	2024 Reasi attack	The Resistance Front	9		Manoj Sinha	Narendra Modi (BJP)
2024	9 July	Attack on Army convoy in Kathua		5		Manoj Sinha	Narendra Modi (BJP)
2024	4 November	Grenade attack on Lal Chowk, Srinagar	Lashkar-e-Taiba	0 (12 injured)			Narendra Modi (BJP)
2025	22 April	2025 Pahalgam attack	Lashkar-e-Taiba	28			Narendra Modi (BJP)
2026	31 July	Attack on labourers in Kulgam		2			Narendra Modi (BJP)
2026	11 November	2026 Kulgam attack	Lashkar-e-Taiba	0			

== Bibliography ==
- Evans, Alexander (2002). "A departure from history: Kashmiri Pandits, 1990–2001". Contemporary South Asia. 11 (1): 19–37. doi:10.1080/0958493022000000341. ISSN 0958-4935. S2CID 145573161.
- Swami, Praveen (2007), India, Pakistan and the Secret Jihad: The Covert War in Kashmir, 1947–2004, Routledge, ISBN 978-1-134-13752-7
