= List of terrorist incidents in 2001 =

This is a timeline of incidents in 2001 that have been labelled terrorism and are not believed to have been carried out by a government or its forces (see state terrorism and state-sponsored terrorism), of which the most notable were the September 11 attacks.

== List guidelines ==
- To be included, entries must be notable (have a stand-alone article) and described by a consensus of reliable sources as "terrorism".
- List entries must comply with the guidelines outlined in the manual of style under MOS:TERRORIST.
- Casualty figures in this list are the total casualties of the incident, including immediate casualties and later casualties (such as people who succumbed to their wounds long after the attacks occurred).
- Casualties listed are the victims. Perpetrator casualties are listed separately (e.g. x (+y) indicate that x victims and y perpetrators were killed/injured).
- Casualty totals may be underestimated or unavailable due to a lack of information. A figure with a plus (+) sign indicates that at least that many people have died (e.g. 10+ indicates that at least 10 people have died) – the actual toll could be considerably higher. A figure with a plus (+) sign may also indicate that over that number of people are victims.
- If casualty figures are 20 or more, they will be shown in **bold**. In addition, figures for casualties more than 50 will also be **underlined**.
- Incidents are limited to one per location per day. If multiple attacks occur in the same place on the same day, they will be merged into a single incident.

== January ==
Dates	Type	Dead	Injured	Location	Details	Perpetrator	Part of

== February ==
Dates	Type	Dead	Injured	Location	Details	Perpetrator	Part of
February 9	Massacre	15		Rajouri district, India	2001 Chalwalkote massacre: A group of Muslim militants massacred 15 Muslim villagers.	Kashmiri Islamic Terrorists	Insurgency in Jammu and Kashmir
February 14	Vehicular Assault	8 (+1)	26	Near Azor, Israel	2001 Azor attack: A Hamas terrorist plowed a bus into a crowd, killing 8 and wounding 26.	Hamas	Second Intifada
February 16	Bus bombing	12	43	Podujevo, Federal Republic of Yugoslavia	Podujevo bus bombing: A bus carrying Kosovo Serb pilgrims was bombed, killing 12. Kosovo Albanian extremists were suspected of being behind the attack.	Kosovo Albanian extremists (suspected)	Aftermath of the Yugoslav Wars

== March ==
Dates	Type	Dead	Injured	Location	Details	Perpetrator	Part of
March 4	Suicide bombing	3 (+1)	65	Netanya, Israel	2001 Netanya bombing: A Hamas suicide bomber killed 3 and wounded 65.	Hamas	Second Intifada
March 4	Car bombing	0	1	White City, London, England, United Kingdom	2001 BBC bombing: The Real IRA exploded a car bomb outside the BBC's main news centre. One London Underground worker suffered deep cuts to his eye from flying glass and some damage was caused to the front of the building.	Real IRA	Dissident Irish Republican campaign
March 16	Bombing	108	38	Shijiazhuang, Hebei	Shijiazhuang bombings: A total of 108 people were killed, and 38 others injured when within a short period of time several bombs exploded near four apartment buildings.	Jin Ruchao	lone-wolf terrorist
March 26	Sniper attack	1	1	Hebron, West Bank	Murder of Shalhevet Pass: A 10-month-old Israeli baby named Shalhevet Pass is murdered in a sniper attack by Tanzim militant Mahmud Amru. Shalhevet's father was also wounded.	Tanzim	Second Intifada

== April ==
Date	Type	Dead	Injured	Location	Details	Perpetrator	Part of
April 14	Bombings	10	≈50	Dhaka, Bangladesh	2001 Ramna Batamul bombings: Two bombs explode at a Pohela Boishakh parade.	Harkat-ul-Jihad al-Islami	Internal conflict in Bangladesh

== May ==
Date	Type	Dead	Injured	Location	Details	Perpetrator	Part of
May 8	Kidnapping and murder	2	0	Tekoa, West Bank	Murders of Koby Mandell and Yosef Ishran: Two Israeli teenagers are kidnapped and murdered from an Israeli settlement. The killers are never found.	Unknown	Second Intifada
May 18	Suicide Bombing	5 (+1)	100+	Netanya, Israel	2001 HaSharon Mall suicide bombing: A Hamas suicide bomber blew himself up at the entrance of a shopping mall, 5 people were killed in the blast and over 100 men, women and children were injured.	Hamas	Second Intifada

== June ==
Date	Type	Deaths	Injuries	Location	Details	Perpetrators	Part of
June 1	Suicide bombing	21 (+1)	100+	Tel Aviv, Israel	Dolphinarium discotheque massacre: A Palestinian named Saeed Hotari blew himself up while waiting in line to enter the Dolphinarium nightclub, killing 21 people, mostly teenage girls. Both Islamic Jihad and Hamas claimed responsibility.	Hamas; Islamic Jihad	Israeli–Palestinian conflict

== July ==
Date	Type	Deaths	Injuries	Location	Details	Perpetrator	Part of
July 16	Suicide bombing	2 (+1)	6	Israel	Binyamina train station suicide bombing: An Arab suicide bomber detonated at a bus stop near a train station. Islamic Jihad claimed responsibility for the attack which killed two people.	Islamic Jihad	Israeli–Palestinian conflict

== August ==
Date	Type	Deaths	Injuries	Location	Details	Perpetrator	Part of
August 3	Bombing	0	7	Ealing, United Kingdom	2001 Ealing bombing: The last (at time of writing) IRA bomb on mainland Britain explodes in West London, injuring seven people.	Real IRA	Dissident Irish Republican campaign
August 3	Massacre	17	5	Doda district, India	2001 Kishtwar massacre: 17 Hindu villagers are kidnapped and murdered by Lashkar-e-Taiba militants.	LeT	Insurgency in Jammu and Kashmir
August 9	Suicide bombing	15 (+1)	130	Jerusalem	Sbarro restaurant suicide bombing: Hamas militant Izz al-Din Shuheil al-Masri blows himself up in a Sbarro restaurant, killing 15 civilians, including 7 children and a pregnant woman.	Hamas	Second Intifada
August 10	Land mine, shooting	252	165	Angola	2001 Angola train attack: UNITA militants derail a train en route from Zenza do Itombe to Dondo and open fire on the passengers after they came out the train.	UNITA	Angolan Civil War

== September ==
Date	Type	Deaths	Injuries	Location	Details	Perpetrator	Part of
September 9	Suicide bombing	3 (+1)	94	Nahariya, Israel	Nahariya train station suicide bombing: A suicide bomber detonated at a train station, killing three people and wounding over 90 unarmed civilians. The Palestinian militant group Hamas took responsibility for the murders.	Islamists	Second Intifada
September 11	Suicide hijackings	2,977 (+19)	6,000+	United States	September 11 attacks: 2,977 victims and 19 terrorists were killed in a series of hijacked airliner crashes into two U.S. landmarks: the World Trade Center in New York City, and the Pentagon in Arlington County, Virginia. A fourth plane, suspected by many to have been originally intended to hit the White House or the United States Capitol in Washington, D.C., crashes in Somerset County, Pennsylvania, after an apparent revolt against the hijackers by the plane's passengers.	Al-Qaeda	
September 18	Bioterrorism	5	17	United States	2001 anthrax attacks: A number of letters containing high-grade Anthrax are sent to U.S. Senators Patrick Leahy and Tom Daschle and a number of news organizations across the U.S. in September and October 2001, killing five people and infecting seventeen others. The prime suspect, Bruce Edwards Ivins, a microbiologist for the USAMRIID, committed suicide in 2008 after learning that charges against him were likely, but he has never been confirmed to have committed the attacks.	Unknown	
September 27	Bombing	0	0	Santiago de Chile, Chile	Case Letter-bombs: The so-called "letter-bomb" case was a terrorist attack on the United States Embassy, perpetuated by Lenin Guardia, a sociologist and intelligence analyst, who was known to have contributed to the disarticulation of a guerrilla group during the transition to democracy, that its end was the indictment of the FPMR (Chilean extreme left group).	Lenin Guardia	

== October ==
Date	Type	Dead	Injured	Location	Details	Perpetrator	Part of
October 1	Suicide car bombings	38 (+3)		Srinagar, India	2001 Jammu and Kashmir legislative assembly car bombing: Three suicide car bombers ram their cars into the Jammu and Kashmir Legislative Assembly	JeM	Insurgency in Jammu and Kashmir
October 10	Attempted bombing	0	0	Mexico City, Mexico	2001 Mexican Chamber of Deputies bombing attempt: Attempted bombing of the Mexican Chamber of Deputies building by men later identified as former members of the Israeli special forces.	Saer Ben-Zvi; Salvador Gersson Smeck	
October 17	Assassination	1	0	Jerusalem, Israel	Assassination of Rehavam Ze'evi: Israel's tourism minister Rehavam Ze'evi is assassinated by three Popular Front for the Liberation of Palestine members at the Hyatt hotel	PFLP	Second Intifada

== November ==
Date	Type	Dead	Injured	Location	Details	Perpetrator	Part of
November 29	Suicide bombing	3 (+1)	7	Pardes Hanna-Karkur, Israel	Pardes Hanna bus bombing: An Arab suicide bomber detonated on a bus traveling on a major highway between Hadera and Afula, killing 3.	Islamic Jihad	Second Intifada

== December ==
Date	Type	Deaths	Injuries	Location	Details	Perpetrator	Part of
December 1	Suicide bombings, car bombing	11 (+2)	188	Jerusalem, Israel	Ben Yehuda Street bombings#2001: Arab suicide bombers detonated on Ben Yehuda Street, a pedestrian mall frequented by many young people on Saturday night. A car bomb exploded nearby 20 minutes later. Ten people were killed, including many children, and 188 were injured in the terrorist attacks.	Hamas	Second Intifada
December 2	Suicide bombing	15 (+1)	40	Haifa, Israel	Haifa bus 16 suicide bombing: A Hamas suicide bomber boarded a bus traveling from the Neveh Sha'anan district, paying the driver with a large bill. He then blew himself up as the driver asked him to collect his change.	Hamas	Second Intifada
December 12	Bombing, shooting	11 (+3)	30	Immanuel, West Bank	2001 Immanuel bus attack: Three Palestinian militants from Hamas detonate two roadside bombs before opening fire on a bus	Hamas	Second Intifada
December 13	Shooting	9 (+5)	18	New Delhi, India	2001 Indian Parliament attack: A group of Lashkar-e-Taiba and Jaish-e-Mohammed terrorists open fire on the Indian Parliament, killing 8 security personnel and a gardener.	LeT; JeM	
December 22	Attempted bombing	0	0	France/United States Over Atlantic Ocean	2001 failed shoe bomb attempt: Al-Qaeda operative Richard Reid attempts detonate plastic explosives hidden in his shoes on American Airlines Flight 63 en route from Paris to Miami, but is subdued by other passengers.	Richard Reid (Al-Qaeda)	

== See also ==
- List of terrorist incidents
- List of Palestinian suicide attacks
- List of Palestinian rocket attacks on Israel in 2002–2006
