= Indian massacre =

Indian massacre may refer to:

- List of Indian massacres, a list of killings of Euro-Americans and Native Americans by one another in the areas now occupied by the U.S. and Canada
- Genocides in history (before World War I)#Americas, the huge and precipitous decline in Native populations in the Americas after European arrival
- List of massacres in India, a list of events since about the mid-eighteenth century
