= 2004 Teli Katha massacre =

Terrorist incident in India

Teli Katha massacre
- Location: Teli Katha, Poonch district, Jammu and Kashmir, India
- Date: 26 June 2004
- Target: Muslim Gujjars
- Attack type: Mass Murder
- Weapon: Firearms
- Deaths: 12
- Injuries: 10
- Perpetrator: Lashkar-e-Taiba

2004 Teli Katha massacre was the killing of twelve Muslim Gujjars by Lashkar-e-Taiba militants on 26 June 2004 in the village of Teli Katha (also called Tiali Katha by some sources) in Surankote Tehsil in Poonch district of Jammu and Kashmir.

== Background ==
A violent insurgency has been going on in Jammu and Kashmir since 1989. The militants had intermittently massacred villagers who did not support their cause. The state government had supplied arms to the villagers who had formed Village Defence Committees (VDC) so that they could protect themselves from the militants.

== Attack ==
The murdered villagers included women, children, and men who were members of the Village Defense Committee, had been sleeping in their dhok. They were fired upon indiscriminately. The members of VDC returned fire forcing the militants to flee in 10–15 minutes and thereby saving many lives. The deceased include seven members of the VDC and their five children. Ten others including four women and three children were injured. The killings were thought to be revenge for the villagers' co-operation with the Indian army during Operation Sarp Vinash. Anger against the militants ran so high that villagers had previously refused to bury militants killed in this operation by the Indian army, claiming their crimes meant they had renounced Islam.

== Aftermath ==
Investigations by the authorities that Zubair Masih of Lashkar-e-Taiba had led the group of militants who were responsible for the killings.

In August 2004, security forces killed three militants involved in this massacre.
