= Nanoor massacre =

Massacre of civilians by Marxists

Nanoor massacre refers to the massacre of eleven landless labourers allegedly by CPI(M) activists in Suchpur, near Nanoor and under Nanoor police station, in Birbhum district in the Indian state of West Bengal, on July 27, 2000; 25 years ago.

== Background ==
Nanoor is located in the south-eastern corner of the district which is an alluvial plain between Ajay River and Mayurakshi River. It has hot and dry summers, spread over March – May, followed by the monsoon from June to September. 78 per cent of the rainfall occurs during this period.

Per historical records there have been at least 13 intensive droughts between the years 1799 and 1855. The drought of 1836-37 was particularly severe. Floods also wreak havoc. Some 7,000 mud houses either collapsed or remained in bad shape in Nanoor and three other blocks, affecting around 15,000 villagers in 2004.

Nanoor Block covering 24 villages, is economically backward. It has many artisan families who live below the poverty line. A large section of the population is either Muslim or belong to the Scheduled Castes and Tribes. Although the population is talented they hardly had an opportunity to earn a decent living.

Nanoor was described by The Statesman in 2003 as "the most politically disturbed area in Birbhum district". With acute poverty it has been a disturbed area for ages.

== Massacre ==
Victims of Nanoor massacre
Seikh Nizam
Rasul Bax
Sabur Seikh
Seikh Salamat
Harai Seikh
Saran Mete
Safikul Seikh
Seikh Safiq
Asraf Seikh
Saifur Seikh
Seikh Ali Hossain

Immediately after the Nanoor massacre, the CPI(M) states those killed as dacoits and so on. However, when a spate of reports appeared in the press they were forced to admit that they were indeed landless agricultural wage workers, who were killed because of a land dispute. Somnath Chatterjee, then speaker of the Lok Sabha, in whose parliamentary constituency Nanoor fell, described those killed as "hired goons, dacoits and dreaded anti-socials". The CPI(M) had earlier been trying to analyse what happened in Nanoor as a fight between farmers and landlords desperate to recapture land they had lost earlier but they late changed course. Anil Biswas and Biman Bose, both politburo members and senior leaders of CPI(M), condemned the Nanoor killings and also the violence caused by political rivalry resulting in deaths earlier in the area.

The Hindu wrote, "On a long term, the killings, symbolizing the birth of a new theater of violence after Keshpur in district Midnapore - where deaths and maiming in political clashes have become a bizarre routine - constitute an extremely disturbing augury for the society in Bengal". The West Bengal Chief Minister, Jyoti Basu, said that at least 800 Left Front party workers, mostly belonging to the CPI(M) had been killed in clashes with the supporters of the Trinamool-BJP combine. He felt that everybody, including Left party workers had the right of self-defence, but appealed to them to restrain themselves even in the face of atrocities.

== Aftermath ==
Abdul Khalek, the prime witness to the Nanoor killings, and his guard, Jahangir Alam, were injured in an attack allegedly by CPI(M) activists, on 12 May 2005. Four people were arrested for the attack, the next day. Although local people thought of the arrested as having links with the ruling party, police were yet to ascertain their political connections.

The Statesman in an editorial wrote, "The sole purpose in attacking the prime witness in the gruesome Nanoor massacre of July 2000 in which 11 Trinamul Congress supporters were slaughtered by armed CPI(M) cadres was to shield those responsible and abort their trial, by hook or by crook. The irony is that although five years have elapsed since the occurrence of the horrendous killings by the Marxists, the trial of their 79 accused comrades had not begun". In 2005, The Statesman in an editorial said, "Repeated postponement of hearing (at least seven in the last two years) because of failure of the accused to turn up in court has made the outcome uncertain."

Just before start of the Nannor massacre trials in 2005 CPI(M) cadre were allegedly creating panic in the area threatening the witnesses repeatedly. A Trinamul Congress delegation visiting the villages to is reported that though there were a few police camps, the villages in the area were still in the grip of CPI(M) men.

Two main accused in the Nanoor massacre, Nitya Chatterjee and Manirujjaman, filed nominations as CPI(M) candidates for the panchayat polls in 2003.

In 2004, the West Bengal Government was reprimanded by Kolkata High Court for slow progress in the Nanoor massacre trial.

== Political equations ==
Nanoor was traditionally considered one of the strongest bastions of CPI(M) in Birbhum district. However, the Nanoor massacres brought about a considerable change in the scenario. The Trinamul Congress started building on the unfortunate and has developed a base in the area. The changing scenario has been rather noticeable. In 2003, the CPI(M) charged Trinamul Congress with terrorising voters in the area, and demanded fresh polling in a majority of the booths in the Thupsara panchayat area in Nanoor block.

The Nanoor area has continued to be turbulent, with political clashes and murders continuing. There are certain villages in the area which are known as Trinamool Congress strongholds and CPI(M) has been trying to capture such villages. On the basis of a FIR (first information report) lodged with the police against CPI(M) men, the police made arrests and in August 2001 the police submitted charge sheets against 82 accused. The trial started in 2000 and continued for eight years. During the trial 10 accused persons have died. The police has not been able to arrest five of the accused. Thirty-two witnesses have appeared in court. The court verdict is expected in November 2010.

== Verdict on Nanoor ==
The session court delivered verdict on Nanoor Massacre case in 2010, when 44 persons were convicted and sentenced to Life Imprisonment. Out of the 44, four were CPI(M) members, and 40 were CPI(M) supporters.

== See also ==
- List of massacres in India
