= Raghunath Temple =

Hindu Temple in Jammu, India

- Raghunath Mandir
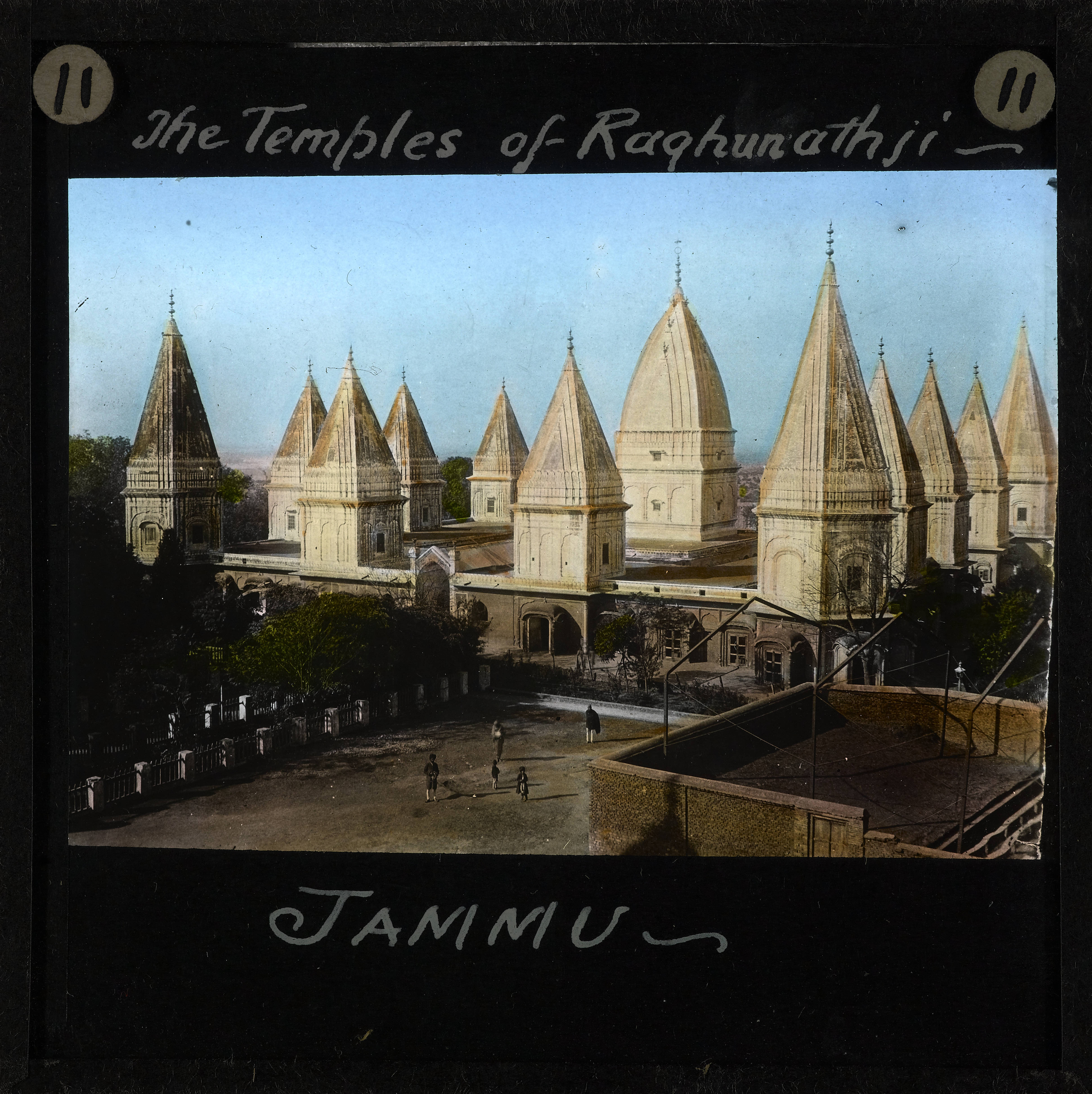
- Raghunath Temple complex

- Location in Jammu Raghunath Temple (India)

Religion
- Affiliation: Hinduism
- District: Jammu district
- Deity: Rama

Location
- Location: Jammu
- State: Jammu and Kashmir
- Country: India
- Interactive map of Raghunath Temple
- Coordinates: 32.730401°N 74.862325°E

Architecture
- Creator: Maharaja Gulab Singh and Maharaja Ranbir Singh
- Completed: 1851–1857

Specifications
- Temple: 7
- Monument: 7
- Elevation: 350 m (1,148 ft)

Website
- jammu.nic.in/tourist-place/raghunath-temple-jammu/

Raghunath Temple is a Hindu temple located in Jammu in the Indian union territory of Jammu and Kashmir. It consists of a complex of seven Hindu shrines. Raghunath Temple was constructed by the first Dogra ruler Maharaja Gulab Singh in the year 1835 and later his son Maharaja Ranbir Singh got it completed in the year 1860 during Dogra rule. The temple has many gods in its complex of shrines, but the presiding deity is Rama – also known as Raghunath, an Avatar of Vishnu.

All the spiral-shaped towers have gold plated spires. The niches in the walls of the shrines are decorated with 300 well-crafted icons of gods and goddesses including those of Surya and Shiva, but most are particularly related to the life stories of Rama and Krishna. The paintings in the 15 panels of the main shrine are based on themes from Ramayana, Mahabharata, and Bhagavad Gita. The temple premises include a school and a library that preserves over 6,000 manuscripts in many Indian languages, with a notable collection of Sarada script Sanskrit manuscripts.

The temple witnessed two terrorist attacks in the year 2002, when militants attacked it in March and November, with grenades and indulged in indiscriminate firing which resulted in the death of 20 devotees and also in injuries to over 40 people.

== Location ==
The temple complex is located in the old part of the Jammu city north of River Tawi with an average elevation of 350 m (1,150 ft) in Jammu and Kashmir. The city is well connected by road, rail and air services. The National Highway 1 A passes through Jammu and connects with all parts of the country. Jammu city has a railway station called Jammu Tawi, on the northern railway line, that is well connected with major cities of India. Express trains operate from this station to Delhi, Mumbai, Chennai, Kolkata and Amritsar. Jammu Airport operates flights to many cities in India such as Delhi, Leh and Srinagar.

== History ==
During the reign of the rulers of Jammu Shivaliks, after 1765, there was a spurt in temple building activity in Jammu area, which continued during the early period of the 19th century. The rulers built spiral shaped temples with brick and crowned each tower with bright Kalashas in the shape of shikhara (rising tower). One such temple complex was started in 1822 (1835 is also mentioned) by Gulab Singh, the ruler of Jammu and was dedicated to his guru Baba Prem Das. Its construction was completed in 1860 by his son Maharaja Ranbir Singh. However, according to an inscription in Brahmic script (Takri) at the entrance of the temple, Gulab Singh and his brother Dhyan Singh are credited with building the temple in 1827 in honour of Mahant Jagannath.

=== Library and religious school ===
During the reign of Ranbir Singh, the temple complex started a pathshala (school) which welcomed students from all castes and classes. The temple housed a library with some 6,000 manuscripts. These are mostly copies made from manuscripts not available for sale, in Devanagari from Sarada originals, by scribes employed by the library in the nineteenth century. The library added to its collection, in the 19th century, a dozen rare Sanskrit birch bark codices in the Sarada script as an object of curiosity. The collection as indexed by Stein, included Sanskrit manuscripts (predominantly Devanagari) of Vedic literature, grammar, lexicography, prosody, music, rhetoric, Kavya, drama, fables, dharmasutras, Mimamsa, Vedanta, Samkhya, Yoga, Nyaya, Jyotisha, Architecture, Medicine, Epics, Puranas, Bhakti and Tantra.

Singh funded a translation centre and included an effort to translate texts in Arabic and Persian languages into Sanskrit. According to Zutshi, this inter-religious initiative was praised by his contemporaries.

The Raghunath temple remains a significant scholarly source of Sarada script manuscripts and one of the largest collection of Hindu and Buddhist texts of the Kashmir tradition. The Raghunath temple has been an early promoter of digitization initiative of the manuscripts it houses, and has started the eGangotri initiative to digitize ancient manuscripts from other parts of India.

== Features ==
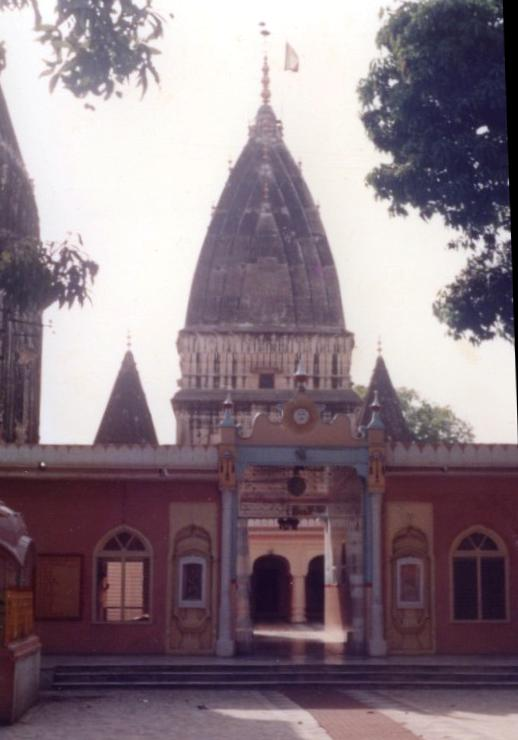
A view of Shikhara of Raghunath Temple, Jammu, India (1988)

The Raghunath temple has seven shrines. The temple complex is dedicated to Raghunath, another name for Rama. The entrance has a Surya icon, another manifestation of Vishnu. It is built over a raised platform of 5 feet (1.5 m) height in an octagonal shape. The front fascia is 40 feet (12 m) in width while the main shrine is set 50 feet (15 m) away from the entrance. Within the enclosed space of the yard there are residential buildings and open cattle yards on its eastern and northern directions. The front fascia of the temple has three entry doors. The main shrine which is 20 feet (6.1 m)x20 feet (6.1 m) in size, is surrounded by a circumambulatory passage (pradakshina path) of 10 feet (3.0 m) width. The entrance door, set on one side of this octagonal chamber of the shrine, faces east. The interior of the inner chamber is gold plated. The main walls of the outer chamber have 15 panels, each of 9 feet (2.7 m) height. These interior panels have a surfeit of paintings of the Jammu School of painting consisting of images from the Hindu epics Ramayana, Mahabharata, and Bhagavad Gita, represented by gods such as Ganesha, Krishna, Sheshashayi Vishnu (reclining Vishnu) and also a large painting depicting the Sita Swayamvara scene (Sita choosing her husband from an elite gathering of princesses). Apart from the mythology related themes, some paintings relate to secular aspects, like Kabir, a saint, engaged in weaving and army personnel of Dogra and Sikh communities. The paintings also reveal the type of attire and the weaponry prevalent during the period of temple building.

In the main shrine, the idol of Rama, which is the family deity of the then king and the Dogra people, is deified in the garbhagriha (sanctum sanctorum). The shrine has a dome instead of the normal shikara in a pyramidal shape, which is in the Sikh architectural style. All the seven shrines have gold plated spires. Gods and Goddesses enshrined in the seven shrines are all related to the epic Ramayana. The shrines are also enshrined with a very large number of Saligramas (fossil ammonite stones specially obtained from the Gandaki River, in Nepal – a Vaishnava (Hindu) aniconic representation of Vishnu).

A distinct feature noted in the entire temple complex is the stucco style embellishments built with brick masonry and finished with plaster. The motifs crafted are of floral (lotuses) and geometric designs, on the walls, in the niches and on arches. Apart from paintings on the walls, the niches in the interior parts of the shrines have 300 well crafted images of deities. The profusion of paintings and images on the internal and external faces of the temple was considered an auspicious feature, instead of leaving the wall surfaces blank. However, the images and murals on the outer walls of the temple have since been demolished.

== Terrorist attacks ==
On 30 March 2002, a terrorist outfit first attacked in the market area by lobbing grenades and then entered the temple where they started firing. The security forces surrounded them. Ten persons, including four security forces personnel and two militants were killed and many more were injured. The second attack took place at the temple on 24 November 2002, when the Hindus were performing puja in the temple; this attack was committed by bombers of the Lashkar-e-Taiba and resulted in the deaths of 13 devotees and injuries to over 40.

== Bibliography ==
- Asthana, N. C.; Nirmal, Anjali (1 January 2009). Urban Terrorism: Myths and Realities. Pointer Publishers. ISBN 978-81-7132-598-6.
- Betts, Vanessa; McCulloch, Victoria (10 February 2014). Indian Himalaya Footprint Handbook: Includes Corbett National Park, Darjeeling, Leh, Sikkim. Footprint Travel Guides. ISBN 978-1-907263-88-0.
- Charak, Sukh Dev Singh; Billawaria, Anita K. (1 January 1998). Pahāṛi Styles of Indian Murals. Abhinav Publications. ISBN 978-81-7017-356-4.
- Harappa, Mohin Jadarro. India Divided Religion 'Then' (1947) (East-West): 'Now' What Languages ( North-South ) ?. PublishAmerica. ISBN 978-1-4626-5451-2.
- Warikoo, K. (1 January 2009). Cultural heritage of Jammu and Kashmir. Pentagon Press. ISBN 978-81-8274-376-2.
- Zutshi, Chitralekha (January 2004). Languages of Belonging: Islam, Regional Identity, and the Making of Kashmir. C. Hurst & Co. Publishers. ISBN 978-1-85065-694-4.
