= 1998 Prankote massacre =

1998 killings of Hindus in Jammu and Kashmir

Prankote Massacre
- Location: Prankote, Jammu and Kashmir, India
- Date: 17 April 1998
- Target: Hindus
- Attack type: Mass murder, arson, attempted forcible conversion
- Deaths: 29
- Perpetrators: Lashkar-e-Taiba; Hizbul Mujahideen

The 1998 Prankote massacre was the killing and beheading of 29 Hindus in the villages of Prankote and Dakikote by Islamist militants in the Udhampur district (now in Reasi district) of the erstwhile Indian state of Jammu and Kashmir on 17 April 1998. The victims included 13 women and children. The houses of those killed were later set to fire. Survivors claimed that the killers had told the villagers to convert to Islam and massacred the villagers after they refused. More than 1,000 villagers fled their homes in the area after the massacre. It also provoked outrage across India. The massacre was one of a series of massacres of Hindu villagers by Islamist militants in 1998.

== Attack ==
The village lay on one of the routes used by terrorists infiltrating from neighbouring Pakistan. Weeks before the massacre, local police alerted that foreign infiltrators were present in the area. On the night of 17 April 1998, militants forced entry into four Hindu houses of the village and massacred the inhabitants, and set the houses on fire. According to a survivor, the killers ordered them to convert to Islam and to prove their conversion by consuming beef — which is prohibited in Hinduism. Upon refusing to do so, their throats were slit. One woman who managed to escape later succumbed to her burn injuries, and her body was found in a gorge.

It took 10 hours for news of the attack to reach the authorities. Security forces did not arrive until the following day. The J&K police learned of the incident close to 48 hours after it had happened. The police party that was heading to the site by trekking through the difficult terrain of the area was airlifted to the spot in the Chief Minister’s helicopter. One police official noted that the village "resembled a ghost area, with beheaded bodies lying scattered."

== Aftermath ==
The incident triggered an exodus of villagers from the area, with more than 1,000 fleeing to Reasi, Pouni Thanpal, Chasana and other towns of the district, where they were accommodated in camps. Congress President Sonia Gandhi visited the camps and was told by the villagers that they were unwilling to return to their homes unless adequate security could be provided. Many of them, including survivors of the massacre, continue to live in these camps in abject conditions and allege neglect by the government.

The massacre caused a wave of outrage across India. Top government officials in India vowed to intensify the fight against militants and also warned of possible retaliation against Pakistan, which India alleges trains and arms the militants. Then-Chief Minister of the state, Farooq Abdullah called the incident "shocking," adding that he had "seen tragedies earlier, but this was bloodcurdling. No bullets were fired, the villagers were butchered." LK Advani, Home Minister of India at the time, said that "the aim [of the massacre] was to terrorise people so that they do not return."

In July 2003, one of the accused, Manzoor Ahmed, was convicted of the crime and sentenced to life imprisonment by a court. In April 2008, the mastermind of this attack, Abdul Haque alias Jahangir, an Islamic terrorist belonging to Hizbul Mujahideen, was killed in an encounter with Indian security forces.

== See also ==
- List of terrorist incidents in Jammu and Kashmir
- 1998 Wandhama massacre
- 1998 Chapnari massacre
- 1998 Chamba massacre
