= People's Anti-Fascist Front =

Kashmir militant group

- Dates active: 2020–present
- Active regions: Jammu and Kashmir
- Status: Active
- Wars: Insurgency in Jammu and Kashmir

The People's Anti-Fascist Front (PAFF) is a militant organization, designated as a terrorist group by the Indian government, actively engaged in insurgency in Jammu and Kashmir, an ongoing armed conflict between Kashmiri separatist militants and Indian forces in Jammu and Kashmir. PAFF was established in 2020 by Jaish-e-Mohammad or Lashkar-e-Taiba, two Pakistan-based jihadist militant groups.

The group is responsible for killing of civilians, several government officials, attacking Indian forces, radicalizing youth for recruitment and training in handling guns, ammunition and explosives.

== Description ==
PAFF emerged after the 2019 removal of Article 370 of the Constitution of India by the Indian government which revoked the special status of the Jammu and Kashmir. According to Tracking Terrorism, the group was started in 2020 by Jaish-e-Mohammad or Lashkar-e-Taiba.

PAFF is among several newly emerged militant groups like The Resistance Front, United Liberation Front, and Ghaznavi Force. These groups strive to appear more 'secular' unlike their predecessor militant groups like Jaish-e-Mohammed, Lashkar-e-Taiba, Hizbul Mujahideen, in terms of their nomenclature, logos and slogans, as well as the nature and tone of messaging and communication through their pamphlets. For instance, the names of each of the newly emergent groups depict a clear departure from Islamic nomenclature as adopted by their predecessors. The emphasis of groups like the PAFF or Lashkar-e-Taiba backed The Resistance Front on terminology such as "resistance against occupation," "fascism" and "fascist forces" stems from a desire to justify their activities using a more secular-looking messaging instead of a call for jihad against non-muslims used by their parent organisations. This change is also seen in the logos used by People's Anti-Fascist Front and other outfits.

The PAFF, along with other militant groups have engaged in a form of 'Hybrid Militancy'. A method by which ordinary citizens are recruited into the organization, and return to their normal lives after committing acts of terrorism.

=== Designation as a terrorist group ===
On 7 January 2023, India's Ministry of Home Affairs designated PAFF as a terrorist group.

== Attacks and activities ==
=== Attacks ===
The PAFF has claimed responsibility for several attacks in Jammu and Kashmir against Indian forces.

=== Activities ===
The PAFF has utilised social media videos and posters to disseminate its messaging.
