= 2010 Dantewada bus bombing =

Terrorist incident in India

2010 Dantewada bus bombing Dantewada (India)
- Location: 18.88953°N 81.349831°E; Dantewada district, India
- Date: 17 May 2010 (UTC+5:30)
- Attack type: Bombing
- Weapon: Improvised explosive device (IED) or anti-tank mine
- Deaths: 31-44
- Injuries: 15

The 2010 Dantewada bus bombing occurred on 17 May 2010 when a bus hit a landmine 50 km away from Dantewada, in Chhattisgarh's Dantewada district. Fatalities reports range from 31 to 44, including several Special Police Officers (SPOs) and civilians.

It was the first Naxal attack to target a civilian bus. The attack occurred one month after Dantewada witnessed the worst-ever massacre of CRPF jawans, when 76 troops were killed in the April 2010 Maoist attack in Dantewada.

== See also ==
- List of massacres in India
