= 1925 Indian riots =

The 1925 Indian riots were sixteen communal riots which occurred throughout British India. Reported as being among the worst were in March in Delhi, during September in Aligarh, at Arvi in the Wardha district and in Solapur.

== Aligarh ==
The Aligarh riot occurred on 22 September 1925 in the United Provinces of Agra and Oudh in British India (now the state of Uttar Pradesh) . Of the 16 communal riots that occurred that year, it was counted as one of the most severe. The London Times wrote two stories on the riots. The riot was confined to Aligarh, which is in the top five of most riot prone cities in India. According to a report from the Singapore Free Press, on 24 September 1925, it had been said the rioting was caused by Muslims throwing stones at Hindus during the festival of Ramlila, the Hindus retaliated and in the ensuing violence sixty Muslim men and women were injured and twelve Hindus were hospitalized.

Sheikh Abdullah, at a Muslim League conference at Aligarh, likened the year-long violence to the Crusades and said that the most serious danger that Muslims had ever had to deal with was the ongoing Hindu resurgence. The official number of those killed in the riot was six, four Muslims and two Hindus.

== Bibliography ==
- Simon, Viscount John Allsebrook (1930). Memoranda submitted by the government of India and the India office. University of Wisconsin: Government of India Central Publication Branch. p. 100.
- Brass, Paul R. (2005). The Production of Hindu-Muslim Violence in Contemporary India. University of Washington Press. p. 70. ISBN 978-0-295-98506-0.
- Bapu, Prabhu (2012). Hindu Mahasabha in Colonial North India, 1915-1930: Constructing Nation and History. Routledge. p. 173. ISBN 978-0-415-67165-1.
- Free Press, Singapore (26 September 1925). "Riots at Aligarh". Singapore Free Press.
- Gayer, Laurent (2012). Christophe Jaffrelot (ed.). Muslims in Indian Cities: Trajectories of Marginalisation. C Hurst & Co. p. 136. ISBN 978-1-84904-176-8.
- Cell, John W. (2002). Hailey: A Study in British Imperialism, 1872-1969. Cambridge University Press. p. 135. ISBN 978-0-521-52117-8.
- Horowitz, Donald L. (2001). The Deadly Ethnic Riot. University of California Press. p. 244. ISBN 978-0-520-22447-6.
