= June 2013 Srinagar attack =

Terrorist incident in Kashmir, India

- Location: Srinagar, Jammu and Kashmir, India
- Date: 24 June 2013; 4:30 pm (IST)
- Target: Army convoy
- Attack type: Shooting
- Deaths: 8
- Injuries: 19
- Perpetrator: Hizbul Mujahideen
- Defenders: Indian Rangers and SKBDI

The June 2013 Srinagar attack was an attack on an Indian army convoy by militants in the area of Srinagar, Jammu and Kashmir, India, in which eight jawans were killed.

The attack took place near Hyderpora when army trucks were travelling from Leh on the Baramullah-Jammu National highway. The attack came a day ahead of Prime Minister Manmohan Singh's visit to Sriniger.
