= 2014 Chhattisgarh attack =

Terrorist incident in India

- Part of the Naxalite–Maoist insurgency
- Location of Chhattisgarh in India
- Location: Sukma, Chhattisgarh, India
- Date: 11 March 2014
- Deaths: 16: 15 security personnel 1 civilian
- Injuries: 3
- Perpetrator: Naxals

On 11 March 2014, 15 Indian security personnel and one civilian were shot dead in an attack engineered by Naxals.

== Incident ==
The Central Reserve Police Force and police were traveling from the village of Tongpal to Jeeram Ghati. According to The Hindu, "The team was engaged in an area domination exercise to sanitise the area for troop movements and also to provide security to road construction workers." While traveling, one hundred men surrounded them and began opening fire, killing 15 security personnel and one civilian, and injuring three. The shooting lasted under 15 minutes and after the rebels were able to loot weapons, equipment and ammunition from the wounded and dead. Local police had sounded the alarm about Maoist activity in the region but the security operation was not cancelled.

== Aftermath ==
In 2014, case was registered against several identified as well as 150-200 unidentified Maoists individuals, and handed over to NIA.

In Feb 2024, Special Sessions Court of Bastar, Jagdalpur convicted four individuals to life imprisonment.

In Feb 2025, Chhattisgarh High Court strongly condemned and upheld life sentences computed to four individuals apprehended in this attack.
