= Kamalnagar massacre =

- Location: 23.93°N 91.61°E; Kamalnagar, West Tripura, Tripura, India
- Date: 14 August 2003 (UTC+5:30)
- Target: Bengali Hindus
- Attack type: Massacre
- Weapon: AK 37
- Deaths: 14
- Perpetrator: ATTF insurgents

Kamalnagar massacre refers to the murder of 14 unarmed Bengali Hindu villagers in Kamalnagar on 14 August 2003 by the All Tripura Tiger Force insurgents.

== Background ==
ATTF had been carrying on attacks on Bengali Hindu settlements in a bid to oust all post-1949 settlers from the state. They along with the NLFT had massacred 30 Bengali Hindus in May 2003.

The village of Kamalnagar is situated on a sharp bend on the Agartala Khowai Road, under Kalyanpur police station in West Tripura District. It was a sparsely populated village abundant with mango and jackfruit trees and inhabited by impoverished Bengali Hindu farmers. The dwellings consisted of mud huts and lacked electricity connection. Some of the residents had moved to Kamalnagar from Kalyanpur in 2000, due to fear of attacks by the militants.

== Killings ==
In 2003, on the eve of independence day at around 9:45 pm, the All Tripura Tiger Force insurgents attacked Kamalnagar. The attackers first cordoned off the entire village and set fire to the huts. As the people rushed out of their huts, the militants fired indiscriminately on those came in front of them. Others were chased down and shot at. Some of the militants entered the huts and fired at their victims hiding below the bed. A few villagers were axed to death. During the killing spree the attackers continuously abused the victims.

The attacks lasted around half an hour. According to unconfirmed reports Tripuri villagers from neighbouring areas accompanied the militants. Fourteen Bengali Hindu villagers including seven members of one family were killed in the massacre. Many were injured in the attack. T.B. Roy, the Superintendent of Police arrived on the spot soon after the massacre on his way to Agartala from Khowai.

== Aftermath ==
Tensions began to mount in the Kamalnagar and neighbouring villages of Kalyanpur police station in the aftermath of the massacre. More than 300 Bengali Hindu families abandoned their houses in Kamalpur and took shelter at the Kamalpur High School. The Tripuris residing in the area, including government employees, students and patients all fled the area in fear of backlash. The locals blocked the road, demanding a permanent Tripura State Rifles outpost. Five ministers who went to visit Kamalnagar were heckled by the public.

== Investigation ==
On the next day, one of the survivors filed a written complaint at the Kalyanpur police station. On 5 January 2009, two ATTF commanders identified as Michael and Royal Debbarma who were responsible for the massacre surrendered before the Sub-Divisional Police Officer of Jirania in the West Tripura District. The police investigated the incident and framed charge sheet against seventeen accused. The trial began in 2009 at the Additional District and Sessions Court in Khowai in which the testimonies of 38 witnesses were recorded. At the end of the trial three persons Kartik Debbarma, Brajendra Debbarma and Ashok Debbarma were found guilty and sentenced to life imprisonment. The rest fourteen were acquitted due to lack of evidence.
