= 1997 Sangrampora massacre =

Terrorist incident in India

1997 Sangrampora massacre was the killing of seven Kashmiri Pandit villagers in Sangrampora village of Budgam district of Jammu and Kashmir on 21 March 1997, by unknown gunmen. While militants have been thought behind the killings, police closed the case as untraced.

== The attack ==
This was the one of a series of massacres which selectively targeted minorities in Jammu and Kashmir. The victims were led away and lined up. The unknown gunmen shot and killed seven people. Several people were injured. The killers fled in the dark.. The people who were living in the Sangrampora were Bhat’s and seven members of their family were killed in this attack.

== Aftermath ==
Muslims in the area expressed deep outrage at this brutality and observed a partial strike to protest this heinous crime. The last rites of the victims were performed by residents of the village and were attended by Muslims and Sikhs from neighbouring areas as well. Bharatiya Janata Party called for the dismissal of the government of Farooq Abdullah after this massacre. After this massacre Panun Kashmir was dissolved and reorganised. The motive of these killings was thought to be to discourage the Hindu's who had fled Kashmir from returning and getting rehabilitated by the Farooq Abdullah government.

Following the massacre Government of Jammu and Kashmir provided 2-room flats to Kashmiri Hindus in a colony exclusively built for them in Sheikhpora in Budgam District. The state government also provided the survivors ration and Rs 100,000.

== See also ==
- Persecution of Hindus
- Anti-Hindu sentiment
- Panun Kashmir
- Timeline of the Kashmir conflict
- 1986 Anantnag Riots
- Exodus of Kashmiri Hindus
- 2001 Amarnath pilgrimage massacre
- 2003 Nadimarg massacre
