= 1993 Kishtwar massacre =

1993 killings of Hindus in Jammu and Kashmir

1993 Kishtwar Massacre
- Location: Sarthal, Jammu and Kashmir, India
- Date: 14 August 1993
- Target: Hindus
- Attack type: Mass murder
- Deaths: 16
- Perpetrator: Muslim militants

1993 Kishtwar massacre was the killing of 16–17 Hindu bus passengers by Muslim militants in the Sarthal area of Kishtwar district of the erstwhile state of Jammu and Kashmir in India on 14 August 1993. The massacre was the first of several communally motivated attacks and mass murders of Hindu civilians by militants during the insurgency in the territory. The massacre marked beginnings of the spread of insurgent violence to Jammu region and triggered a migration of some Hindus out of the erstwhile Muslim-majority Doda district.

== Massacre ==
On 14 August 1993, a local bus was hijacked in the Sarthal area near the town of Kishtwar by three Muslim militants armed with AK47s. The women and children were made to disembark the bus, the remaining male passengers were taken to a meadow and were segregated into two groups. The Hindus were fired upon by the militants, with 14 bleeding out and dying there and a further two dying while being taken to a local hospital.

== Aftermath ==
The imam of a mosque in Kishtwar publicly denounced the killings and called for a strike in an attempt to prevent inter-community violence in the town, which had nearly equal number of Hindus and Muslims. The attack was also denounced by the JKLF and Hizbul Mujahideen. Curfew was declared across the Jammu region. Some Hindus began migrating out of the region after the massacre. The massacre marked the expansion of militant influence from the Kashmir Valley into the Jammu region, and underscored its increasing communalisation. Political parties like the BJP and its allies responded with protests and rallies. A Gujjar Muslim leader was killed and four people were later arrested for his murder.

Militias consisting of local villagers called Village Defence Committees (VDC) were formed in the aftermath of the massacre. These were formed with the goal of preventing migrations similar to the exodus of Kashmiri Hindus out of the Muslim-majority Kashmir Valley that had taken place at the beginning of the insurgency. Indian intelligence agencies claim that a Pakistani militant called Muhammad Sajjad Khan (alias Sajjad Afghani) had ordered the massacre. As of 2023, no one has been tried or convicted for the massacre.
