= Bagber massacre =

Terrorist incident in India

- Location: 23.9186°N 91.6431°E; Bagber, West Tripura, Tripura, India
- Date: 20 May 2000 (UTC+5:30)
- Target: Bengali Hindus
- Attack type: Massacre
- Weapons: Rifles, grenades
- Deaths: 25
- Perpetrator: NLFT militants

The Bagber massacre was a massacre of unarmed Bengali Hindu on 20 May 2000 by NLFT (National Liberation Front of Tripura) militants. 25 Bengali Hindus were killed as they were fleeing the Bagber refugee camp.

== Background ==
Bagber is a village under the Kalyanpur police station in West Tripura district of Tripura. It is located in West Ghilatali, approximately 1 km from the police station. In May 2000, during the ongoing ethnic riots scores of Bengali Hindus had taken shelter at a refugee camp in Bagber. The camp was located at the Niranjan Sardarpara Senior Basic School.

== Events ==
On 20 May, at around 5 P.M. a heavily armed group of around 60 NLFT militants raided the Bagber village. They hurled grenade at the house of Ajoy Ghose, the local CPI(M) leader. At the news of the attack, the refugees who had taken shelter adjacent to the Niranjan Sardarpara School, began to flee towards Kanchanpur. Seeing the refugees fleeing, the NLFT militants turned their guns on them. Three refugees were killed instantly. The militants then targeted the inmates at the refugee camp, where they killed sixteen and injured several others. The CRPF personnel deployed at Bagber didn't protest when the massacre took place. 19 Bengali Hindus were killed on the spot and several others were critically injured in the massacre. Six of them succumbed to their injuries later.

== Aftermath ==
On 21 May, at around 11 a.m., suspected NLFT rebels killed three Bengali Hindus at Ratia-Durgapur under Kalyanpur police station. After that the rebels set fire to several houses.

333 families were relocated from five Gram Panchayats of Kalyanpur after the massacre and settled in Amar Colony under North Kalyanpur Gram Panchayat. Each of the families were promised 24 tins and 2,000 rupees cash to build their homes. However, they were not entitled to avail any loan from the North Kalyanpur Gram Panchayat.
