= 2002 Qasim Nagar massacre =

Killing of 29 Hindu labourers

Qasim Nagar Massacre
- Location: Qasim Nagar, Jammu, Jammu and Kashmir, India
- Date: 13 July 2002
- Target: Hindus
- Attack type: Mass murder
- Deaths: 29
- Perpetrator: Lashkar-e-Taiba
- Motive: Islamist Terrorism

The 2002 Qasim Nagar massacre was the killing of 29 Hindu labourers in Qasim Nagar on the outskirts of Jammu city in Jammu and Kashmir, India by Lashkar-e-Taiba militants.

== Background ==
Civilian killings of were an intermittent but recurring feature of the Insurgency in Jammu and Kashmir. Earlier attacks included the Chittisinghpura massacre and the Wandhama massacre.

== The attack ==
On the evening of 13 July 2002, a group of militants, some disguised in the robes of Hindu holy men, walked into the Qasim Nagar slum on the outskirts of Jammu, threw grenades, and opened fire with AK-47 assault rifles. Twenty-four people, all Hindus, were killed at the scene; three more died later in hospital, for a total of 27 dead and at least 30 injured, some critically.

The dead, including 13 women, a child, and two blind beggars, were mostly poor labourers who used old apple crates for shelter. The gunmen escaped into the thickly wooded hills nearby. Many victims had gathered around radios during a power outage to listen to live commentary of the India-England cricket match at Lord's Cricket Ground. The gunmen fled into a nearby forest.

== Aftermath ==
On 15 July, a complete bandh was observed in Jammu in protest against the incident.

The massacre drew swift condemnation. Indian Deputy Prime Minister L. K. Advani, called it "terrorism in its most naked form." Kashmir's separatist organization Jammu Kashmir Liberation Front described it as "a clear act of terrorism" and Pakistan's Foreign Ministry said the attack "appeared to be aimed at increasing tension in the region." British Foreign Secretary Jack Straw said, "terrorism be it in Jammu, Kashmir or anywhere else only serves to renew the determination of the free world to fight this evil." U.S. Secretary of State Colin Powell spoke to External Affairs Minister Yashwant Sinha and condemned the attackThe State Department also released a statement on behalf of Powell that said:

I condemn the vicious killing of over 20 persons in Jammu yesterday. The people of this region deserve peace and development, not the suffering imposed upon them by terrorist thugs who are beyond the pale of the civilised world. The perpetrators of this heinous act are proving once again that they do not have the interest of the Kashmiri people at heart, but rather seek to undermine efforts to ease tensions in the region.

Russia's Ministry of Foreign Affairs, in a communication with the Ministry of External Affairs here, said:

The present terrorist act in Jammu and Kashmir like yesterday's attack on a group of foreign tourists in the north of Pakistan form part of the same chain of international terrorism which present today a major threat to peace and security, including in South Asia. We emphasise that the first step in ending terrorism in Jammu and Kashmir is the consistent implementation of commitments given by the Government of Pakistan for preventing activities of terrorist groups on the territory under its control.

Britain reduced its diplomatic presence in from New Delhi and Islamabad and encouraged British citizens to leave both countries.

== Arrests ==
The Director General of Jammu and Kashmir Police said that "Pakistan-based militant outfit Lashkar-e-Taiba" is responsible for the attack. Subsequently, police arrested Mohammad Abdullah (alias Abu Talah) of Lashkar-e-Taiba in connection with this massacre. Seven more militants belonging to Lashkar-e-Taiba were arrested later.

== See also ==
- 1998 Wandhama massacre
- Chittisinghpura massacre
- List of massacres in India
- List of terrorist incidents in Jammu and Kashmir
