= Chittisinghpura massacre =

Fatal shooting of 35 Sikhs in India on 20 March 2000

Coordinates: 33°43′48.12″N 75°14′41.06″E

- Location: Chittisinghpura, Anantnag district, Jammu and Kashmir, India
- Date: 20 March 2000
- Target: Sikhs
- Attack type: Mass murder
- Deaths: 35

The Chittisinghpura massacre refers to the mass murder of 35 Sikh villagers on 20 March 2000 in the village of Chittisinghpura in Anantnag district, Jammu and Kashmir, India on the eve of the U.S. President Bill Clinton's state visit to India.

The Indian government asserts that the massacre was conducted by the Pakistan-based militant group Lashkar-e-Taiba (LeT) or Hizbul Mujahideen. Though the perpetrators have not been apprehended or convicted and their identity remains debated.

== Killings ==
Wearing Indian Army fatigues, the unknown gunmen arrived into the village in military vehicles in two groups at opposite ends of the village where the two gurdwaras were located. The militants marched from home to home, introducing themselves as Indian Army personnel and ordered every male member of the household come out for security checks. They ordered them to line up in front of the gurdwaras and opened fire, killing thirty-five Sikhs and shouted pro-India slogans after the massacre.

=== Aftermath ===
The massacre was a turning point in the Insurgency in Jammu and Kashmir, where Sikhs had usually been spared from militant violence.

Shortly after the massacre, hundreds of Sikhs gathered in Jammu, shouting anti-Pakistan and anti-Muslim slogans, criticising the Indian government for failing to protect the villagers, and demanding retaliation.

== Investigations ==
In 2000, Indian authorities announced that Mohammad Suhail Malik, a nephew of Lashkar-e-Taiba co-founder Hafiz Muhammad Saeed, confessed while in Indian custody to participating in the attacks at the direction of Lashkar-e-Taiba. He repeated the claim in an interview with Barry Bearak of The New York Times while still in Indian custody. Villagers also told Bearak that militants had visited the place weeks prior and had mingled with them, which they now saw as reconnaissance for the massacre. Widows also claimed to recognized the voices of the attackers. According to Indian journalist Praveen Swami, "Few people in the village believe stories claiming that the assailants were Indian Army soldiers."

In 2005, Sikh organizations headed by the Bhai Kanahiya Jee Nishkam Seva Society demanded a deeper state inquiry into the details of the massacre and for the inquiry to be made public. The state government ordered an inquiry into the massacre.

In an introduction to a book written by Madeleine Albright titled The Mighty and the Almighty: Reflections on America, God, and World Affairs (2006), Bill Clinton accused "Hindu militants" of perpetrating the act. Clinton's office did not return calls seeking comment or clarification. The publishers, HarperCollins, later acknowledged "a failure in the fact-checking process" but did not offer a retraction.

In 2010, the Lashkar-e-Taiba associate David Headley, who was arrested in connection with the 2008 Mumbai attacks, reportedly told the National Investigation Agency that the LeT carried out the Chittisinghpura massacre. He is said to have identified an LeT militant named Muzzamil as part of the group which carried out the killings apparently to create communal tension just before Clinton's visit.

In 2011, a Delhi court cleared Malik of the charges citing insufficient evidence.

== See also ==
- Chattisinghpora, Pathribal, and Barakpora massacres
- List of terrorist incidents in Jammu and Kashmir
- List of massacres in India
- Terrorism in Kashmir
- 2002 Qasim Nagar massacre
- 1998 Wandhama massacre
