= 2001 Kot Charwal massacre =

Terrorist incident in India

Kot Charwal Massacre
- Location: Kot Charwal, Rajouri, Jammu and Kashmir, India
- Date: 9 February 2001
- Target: Bakarwals
- Attack type: Mass murder
- Deaths: 15
- Perpetrator: Lashkar-e-Taiba

2001 Kot Charwal massacre was the killing of 15 ethnic-Bakarwals by militants in the village of Chalwalkote, in the Rajouri district of Jammu and Kashmir, India on 9 February 2001.

== Background ==
A violent insurgency has been going on in Jammu and Kashmir since 1989. The militants had intermittently massacred villagers who did not support their cause. The state government had supplied arms to the villagers who had formed Village Defence Committees (VDC) so that they could protect themselves from the militants. The militants suspected the villagers to be informants for Indian Army.

== The attack ==
The militants came at night and initially asked the villagers to hand over the female members of the village for satisfying their sexual urges. When the villagers resisted this they were attacked. The terrorists came then bolted the house of Abdullah Remo and Bashir Abdullah. Then they lobbed a grenade inside before setting the house on fire. Of the 15 charred bodies which were recovered seven were of children, the youngest one being only four years old.

== Aftermath ==
Chief minister of Jammu and Kashmir Farooq Abdullah condemned the killings.

== See also ==
List of terrorist incidents in Jammu and Kashmir
