= 1998 Chapnari massacre =

1998 massacre in India

Chapnari Massacre
- Location: Chapnari, Doda District, Jammu and Kashmir, India
- Date: 19 June 1998
- Target: Hindus
- Attack type: Mass murder
- Deaths: 26
- Perpetrators: Lashkar-e-Taiba; Hizbul Mujahideen
- Motive: Islamic terrorism

The 1998 Chapnari massacre was a massacre of 26 Hindus in the Chapnari village, Doda district of Jammu & Kashmir, India on 19 June 1998, by terrorists belonging to the Islamic terrorist groups, Lashkar-e-Taiba and Hizbul Mujahideen.

== Background ==
In 1990, 500,000 to 600,000 Kashmiri Hindus left Kashmir after being targeted by Islamist militants.

== The attack ==
The victims were accompanying two marriage parties when they were attacked. Police sources said that five members were spared. Among those who survived Chapnari were the three primary school teachers and the bride.

== Aftermath ==
Chief minister Farooq Abdullah strongly condemned the attack and described it as "yet another barbaric act of Pakistan-sponsored militants in Jammu and Kashmir". India's Home Minister, Lal Krishna Advani, who had recently assumed overall control of Indian policy in the state, described the killing of the wedding guests as "a clear attempt at ethnic cleansing" and said that responsibility for the attack, and the other massacres of Hindus, rested with Pakistan.

In September 1998, Abid Hussain of Lashkar-e-Taiba, who was the main suspect in the massacre, was killed in an encounter by Indian security forces. Another suspect, Attullah of Hizbul Mujahideen, was arrested in June 2004.

== See also ==
- List of terrorist incidents in Jammu and Kashmir
- List of massacres in India
