= 2001 Kishtwar massacres =

Mass killings in Jammu & Kashmir, India

- Location of Kishtwar District in Jammu and Kashmir, India
- Location: Kishtwar District, Jammu and Kashmir, India
- Date: May–August 2001
- Target: Hindus
- Deaths: 43
- Injuries: 5
- Perpetrator: Lashkar-e-Taiba
- Motive: Islamic terrorism

A series of massacres of Hindus in May–August 2001 by Islamic terrorists took place in the erstwhile Doda district (present-day Kishtwar district) of Jammu and Kashmir, India, wherein 43 Hindus were killed. The massacres took place at villages and temporary summer camps called dhoks in remote meadows used by local shepherds. The massacres were committed by members of Lashkar-e-Toiba, a Pakistan-based terrorist group. One massacre is believed to have been instigated by local Muslim shepherd tenants involved in a dispute over the pastures. The massacres triggered tensions across the Jammu region.

== Background ==
An armed insurgency began in the former state of Jammu and Kashmir in northern India in 1989. Several Islamic militant groups were active in the insurgency, and many massacres of Hindus were committed by militants and terrorists in the region, especially in the late 1990s onward.

== Massacres ==
The first massacre happened on 10 May 2001 at Atholi village, in which seven Hindus were killed. The second massacre happened on 21 July 2001 at Cheerji in Kishtwar in which 15 Hindus were killed. In the third incident at Tagood the next day, four more Hindu villagers were killed. A fourth mass killing took place at Shrotidhar on 2 August 2001, in which 17 more Hindus were killed, thereby bringing the total number of killed to 43. The shepherds killed at Shrotidhar belonged to village Ladder, and were from the Rajput and Dalit castes. The shepherds were lined up and shot dead by the terrorists. Some shepherds survived by fleeing the scene and others played dead and hid among the dead bodies. A further five villagers were seriously injured in the attack. All four massacres took place in Hindu-majority Paddar valley.

== Aftermath ==
The last rites of the victims of the Shrotidhar massacre were held in Atholi. The ceremony saw some violence and vandalism. A complete bandh was observed in Jammu the following day in protest. Groups of demonstrators protesting against the Kishtwar carnage torched Pakistani flags and effigies of Pervez Musharraf in Jammu, Kathua and Udhampur. Mujib-ur-Rahman, a commander of the Lashkar-e-Toiba involved in the massacres, was shot dead by police in Doda on 6 August. Another commander was killed by the police five days later.

Following the massacres, the centre and state governments promised to set up dhok defence committees (DDCs) on the pattern of village defence committees (VDCs), to protect shepherds from militant attacks. Home Minister L.K. Advani, also promised new laws to help end violence against vulnerable Hindu communities. On August 9, the state government ordered the imposition of the Disturbed Areas Act in the districts of Doda, Udhampur, Jammu and Kathua.

These killings were subsequently discussed in Indian parliament with opposition criticizing the Government.

== See also ==
List of terrorist incidents in Jammu and Kashmir
