= 2002 Raghunath temple attacks =

Two bombings on Hindu temples in Jammu

2002 Raghunath Temple bombings refers to two fidayeen attacks in 2002 on the Raghunath Temple in Jammu in India. Built by Maharaja Ranbir Singh in 1860, the Raghunath temple is dedicated to Hindu God Rama.

== March attack ==
The first attack occurred on 30 March 2002 when two suicide bombers attacked the temple. Eleven people including three security personnel were killed and 20 were injured. The attack occurred around 10:20 AM when the terrorists arrived, fired at the guards, and killed them on the spot. The attackers stormed the temple, threw a grenade, and fired indiscriminately at the worshippers. After expending his ammunition one of the attackers who was wearing a suicide vest blew himself up. Then Minister of State for External Affairs of India, Omar Abdullah, blamed Pakistan for the terrorist attacks on the Raghunath temple in Jammu and ruled out withdrawing troops from the border, saying Islamabad had done nothing to warrant it.

== November attack ==
A second attacked occurred on 24 November 2002 when two suicide bombers stormed the temple and killed 14 devotees and injured 45 others. Witnesses said terrorists hurled grenades and fired indiscriminately on the heavily guarded Raghunath temple. India blamed a Pakistan-based militant group, Lashkar-e-Taiba, for the attack. Deputy Prime Minister Lal Krishna Advani of India blamed the chief of the Lashkar-e-Taiba, Hafiz Muhammad Saeed for the attack. He was released shortly prior to the attack by the government of Pakistan.

The Gazette of India commented that the personnel of the Central Reserve Police Force (Yatindra Nath Rai, Assistant Commandant; Dev Singh, Head Constable; E.G. Rao, Head Constable; T. A. Singh, Constable; and K. K. Pandey, Constable) "displayed conspicuous gallantry, courage and devotion to duty of a high order". The late K. K. Pandey was posthumously awarded the President's Police Medal for Gallantry. Yatindra Nath Rai, Dev Singh, E. G. Rao and T. A. Singh were awarded the Police Medal for Gallantry.

== See also ==
List of terrorist incidents in Jammu and Kashmir
