= 1998 Chamba massacre =

Killing of Hindus in Himachal Pradesh, India

The 1998 Chamba massacre was the killing of 35 Hindus by the Pakistan-based Islamic terrorist group, Hizbul Mujahideen, in the Chamba district of Himachal Pradesh in India on 3 August, 1998.

== Attacks ==
Pakistan-trained Islamic terrorists massacred 35 Hindus, mostly labourers, and injured 11 in the Chamba district bordering Doda in Jammu on early hours of that day. The massacre took place in two separate incidents at Kalaban and Satrundi. Twenty-six people were killed and eight injured in the Kalaban area under Police Station Tissa of Chamba District. In another incident, at about 1:30 a.m. that morning, five people were killed and three injured in village Satrindi, District Chamba. News of the massacre became public when two of the injured at Kalaban—Dhian Singh and Beli Ram—with blood oozing from their wounds, trudged eight kilometers through the dense forests report the mayhem to the nearest Mansa police station. The massacre led to clashes between Muslim Gujjars and Hindu Gaddis .

== Aftermath ==
Top Hizbul Mujahideen terrorists Billu Gujjar was arrested in Pathankot by Punjab Police a few days later in connection with this attack.

== See also ==
- List of terrorist incidents in Jammu and Kashmir
