= 2006 Doda massacre =

Killing of 35 Hindus in Kashmir by Islamist militants

Doda Massacre
- Location: Doda District, Jammu and Kashmir, India
- Date: 30 April 2006
- Target: Hindus
- Attack type: Mass murder
- Deaths: 57
- Perpetrator: Lashkar-e-Taiba
- Motive: Islamist Terrorism

The 2006 Doda massacre was a mass murder of 57 Hindu civilians in two separate incidents, carried out by Lashkar-e-Taiba militants in the Doda district of Jammu and Kashmir, India on 30 April 2006.

== Attacks ==
Two separate attacks took place on 30 April 2006 in close by areas.

In the first attack, twenty-two unarmed Hindu villagers, mostly shepherds or their families, were lined up and gunned down in Thawa village in Kulhand area of Doda district. The victims included a 3-year-old girl. Ten to twelve people wearing fake Indian Army uniforms carried out the massacre. The doctor who was sent to do the post mortem examination suffered a heart attack on seeing the bodies and was admitted to the hospital.

The second attack occurred in the Lalon Galla village in Basantgarh area of Udhampur district. Thirty-five Hindu shepherds were kidnapped and shot dead on the same day.

The attacks were believed to have been an attempt to derail the impending talks between the Indian government and the All Parties Hurriyat Conference.

== Perpetrators ==
The killings received widespread condemnation, including from the President of India A. P. J. Abdul Kalam and Prime Minister Manmohan Singh. The BJP accused unidentified "terrorists" of carrying out ethnic cleansing. Others accused the Kashmiri militant group Hizbul Mujahideen. India blamed the Pakistan-based terrorist group Lashkar-e-Taiba and called it "cross border terrorism".

In 2007, Australian government attributed the massacre to Lashkar-e-Taiba, which it declared to be a terrorist organisation.
