= Village Defence Guards =

Armed villagers groups in Jammu and Kashmir

Village Defence Guards Village Defence Committees
- Abbreviation: VDGs

Agency overview
- Formed: 1995
- Volunteers: 4,153

Jurisdictional structure
- Operations jurisdiction: Jammu division, Jammu and Kashmir, India
- Governing body: Jammu and Kashmir Police
- General nature: Local civilian police

Operational structure
- Elected officer responsible: Amit Shah, Ministry of Home Affairs
- Agency executive: Nalin Prabhat, IPS, Director General of Police
- Parent agency: Government of Jammu and Kashmir
- Districts: List: Kathua; Samba; Jammu; Udhampur; Reasi; Rajouri; Poonch; Doda; Ramban; Kishtwar

Notables
- Significant Village Defence: Patrolling, Area Domination, Surveillance

Village Defence Guards (VDGs) formerly known as Village Defence Committees is a civilian militia first established in the mid-1990s in the Jammu division of Indian-administered Jammu and Kashmir for the self-defence of locals, especially minorities such as Hindus, Sikhs and vulnerable section of Muslims in remote hilly villages of Jammu division against militancy. It consist of villagers as well as police officers.

VDGs are specifically trained to confront the terrorists who infiltrate from Pakistan. This militia effectively supplies crucial information to the police, thwarting acts of mayhem by the terrorists.

== History ==
The first VDC was set up under Shesh Paul Vaid when he was a Superintendent of Police (SP) in Bagankote village, Udhampur district (now Reasi district) in 1995.

As recently as 2019, the Jammu and Kashmir Police (JKP) set up new VDCs in Kishtwar district, which has over 3,251 VDC members out of which 800 are armed. In Jammu and Kashmir, there were 4,125 VDCs as of December 2019. The Indian Army conducts training camps for VDCs consisting of weapons training and intelligence gathering basics. On 15 September 2019, the Army trained VDCs in Doda sector. They were mainly set up to protect Hindus and Muslims.

Following the killing of a Kashmiri-Hindu Sarpanch in June 2020, former Director General (DGP) of Jammu and Kashmir Police Shesh Paul Vaid said that Hindus and Muslims could be armed and Village Defence Committees could be set up with proper planning. As of 28 February 2023, there are over 100 men armed and provided weapons training in Dhangri, Rajouri.

== Organisation ==
=== Equipment ===
The VDG are equipped with weapons like the L1A1 Self-Loading Rifle, replacing Lee-Enfield rifles.

== See also ==
- Salwa Judum
