= 2002 Amarnath pilgrimage massacre =

Attack on Hindus in Jammu and Kashmir

Coordinates: 34°0′7.2″N 75°19′1.2″E

- Part of the Kashmir conflict
- 2002 Amarnath pilgrimage massacre (Jammu and Kashmir)
- Location: Amarnath Temple, Jammu and Kashmir
- Date: 30 July and 6 August 2002
- Victim: 11 Hindu pilgrims killed
- Perpetrator: Lashkar-e-Taiba
- Motive: Islamist Terrorism

On 30 July and 6 August 2002, in the month of Shraavana, 11 people were killed and 30 injured in a terror attack by Islamic extremists from Lashkar-e-Taiba's front group of al-Mansuriyan, on Nunwan base camp at Pahalgam of the Amarnath Hindu pilgrimage (Yatra) to Amarnath Temple glacial cave shrine in Kashmir Valley in the Indian state of Jammu and Kashmir.

In the spate of attacks on Yatra in the third consecutive year, 2 pilgrims were killed and 3 injured on 30 July when terrorists threw grenades at a civilian taxi of pilgrims in Srinagar. Further, 9 people were killed and 27 injured on 6 August by Lashkar-e-Taiba (LeT) terrorists' hail of bullets at Nunwan base camp at Pahalgam.

== Background ==
The 48-day July–August annual Hindu pilgrimage, undertaken by up to 600,000 or more pilgrims to 130 feet (40 m) high glacial Amarnath cave shrine of the iced stalagmite lingam (an aniconic form of Shiva) at 12,756 feet (3,888 m) in Himalayas, is called the Amarnath Yatra. It begins with a 43 kilometres (27 mi) mountainous trek from the Nunwan and Chandanwari base camp at Pahalgam and reaches cave-shine after night halts at Sheshnag Lake and Panchtarni camps. The yatra is both a way of earning revenue by the state government by imposing tax on pilgrims, and making living by the local Shia Muslim Bakarwal-Gujjars by taking a portion of revenue and by offering services to the Hindu pilgrims, and this source of income has been threatened by the Islamist Kashmiri Sunni militant groups who have banned and attacked the yatra numerous times, and massacred at least 43 people in the Amarnath pilgrimage terrorist-attack massacre (2000) and Amarnath pilgrimage terrorist-attack massacre (2001) causing the deaths of 33 Hindu pilgrims and 10 Muslim civilians.

== Massacre ==
On 2 August 2000, pro-Pakistan Islamist terrorists from Hizbul Mujahideen (designated a terrorist organisation by India, European Union and United States,) massacred at least 31 people and injured at least 60 people in a two hour long indiscriminate shoot out at Nunwan base camp in Anantnag district, causing the death of 21 unarmed Hindu pilgrims and 7 unarmed Muslim shopkeepers, and 3 security force officers. This attack on Amarnath yatra was part of the larger 1st and 2nd August 2000 Kashmir massacre in 5 separate coordinated terrorist attacks that killed at least 89 (official count) to 105 people (as reported by PTI), and injured at least 62 more.

On 20 July 2001, a terrorist threw a grenade on a pilgrim night camp at Sheshnag near the Amarnath shrine in which at least 13 persons, including 3 women, were killed in two explosions and firing by militants, 2 were security officials and 3 were Muslim civilians. 15 other were also injured in the attack.

== Aftermath ==
Earlier attacks on Amarnath yatra and Bin Laden's September 11 attacks on USA, were some of the incidents that forced the change in global response to the Islamic terror attacks from aloof and sporadic to united and coordinated. Pakistan-backed Islamic terrorist organizations, Lashkar-e-Taiba founded by Hafiz Saeed and Hizbul Mujahideen were designated terrorist organisations by India, European Union and United States.

== See also ==
- Kanwar Yatra
- Islamic terrorism
- Nandimarg terrorist-attack massacre (2003)
- Amarnath pilgrimage terrorist-attack massacre (2017)
- Amarnath land transfer controversy
- List of terrorist incidents in India
- List of Islamist terrorist attacks
- List of terrorist incidents in Jammu and Kashmir
