= 2001 Amarnath pilgrimage massacre =

Amarnath pilgrimage massacre in 2001

- Location: Sheshnag Lake, Jammu and Kashmir, India
- Date: 20 July 2001
- Target: Hindu Pilgrims
- Attack type: Mass murder
- Motive: Islamist Terrorism

On 20 July 2001, in the month of Shraavana, 13 people were killed and 15 others injured in a terror attack on a pilgrim night camp at Sheshnag Lake near the Amarnath Temple glacial cave shrine in Kashmir Valley in the Indian state of Jammu and Kashmir, in two explosions and firing by militants. In a pre-dawn attack, terrorists penetrated several layers of security cordon and exploded two improvised explosive devices (lEDs), casualties included 8 Hindu civilian pilgrims entailing 2 women, and 3 Muslim civilians and 2 security personnel.

== Background ==
The 48-days July–August annual Hindu pilgrimage, undertaken by up to 600,000 or more pilgrims to 130 feet (40 m) high glacial Amarnath cave shrine of iced stalagmite Shiv linga e at 12,756 feet (3,888 m) in Himalayas, is called Amarnath Yatra. It begins with a 43 kilometres (27 mi) mountainous trek from the Nunwan and Chandanwari base camps at Pahalgam and reaches cave-shine after night halts at Sheshnag Lake and Panchtarni camps.

The yatra is both a way of earning revenue by the state government by imposing tax on pilgrims, and making living by the local Shia Muslim Bakarwal-Gujjars by taking a portion of revenue and by offering services to the Hindu pilgrims, and this source of income has been threatened by the militant groups who have banned and attacked the yatra numerous times, as well as have massacred at least 30 and injured at least 60 people in Amarnath pilgrimage terrorist-attack massacre (2000) causing the deaths of 21 unarmed Hindu pilgrims, 7 Muslim civilians and 3 security forces in a two hour long indiscriminate shoot out at Pahalgam town in Anantnag district.

This attack on Amarnath yatra was part of the larger 1st and 2nd August 2000 Kashmir massacre in 5 separate coordinated terrorist attacks that killed at least 89 (official count) to 105 people (as reported by PTI), and injured at least 62 more.

== Aftermath ==
Union Government of India released the additional funding and state Government of Jammu and Kashmir tightened the security. Few weeks later Bin Laden launched September 11 attacks on USA which forced the change in global response to the Islamic terror attacks from aloof and sporadic to united and coordinated. Pakistan-backed Islamic terrorist organizations, Lashkar-e-Taiba founded by Hafiz Saeed and Hizbul Mujahideen were designated terrorist organisations by India, European Union and United States.

== See also ==
- Islamic terrorism
- Kanwar Yatra
- 2003 Nadimarg massacre
- Terrorist attack on Amarnath Yatra (2017)
- Amarnath land transfer controversy
- List of terrorist incidents in India
- List of Islamist terrorist attacks
