= 2017 Amarnath Yatra massacre =

Mass murder of Hindu pilgrims

2017 Amarnath Yatra attack
- Part of Kashmir conflict
- Location: Anantnag district, Jammu and Kashmir, India
- Date: 10 July 2017; 9 years ago Night (IST)
- Target: Bus carrying pilgrims
- Attack type: Mass shooting
- Deaths: 8
- Injuries: 18
- Victim: Hindu pilgrims
- Perpetrator: Lashkar-e-Taiba
- Assailants: 4 LeT attackers; three logistics providers
- Accused: Attackers, all killed: Abu Ismail (mastermind); Yawar Bashir; Furqan; Maawiya; Logistic support, all arrested: Bilal Ahmed Reshi; Aizaj Wagey; Zahoor Ahmed

On 10 July 2017, the first Monday of the month of Shraavana, 8 Hindu civilian pilgrims (seven of whom were women), en route from Amarnath Temple in Kashmir Valley (Jammu and Kashmir), were killed in an Islamist terror attack. The pilgrims mostly belonged to the Indian state of Gujarat. At least 19 others were injured in the attack.

== Background ==
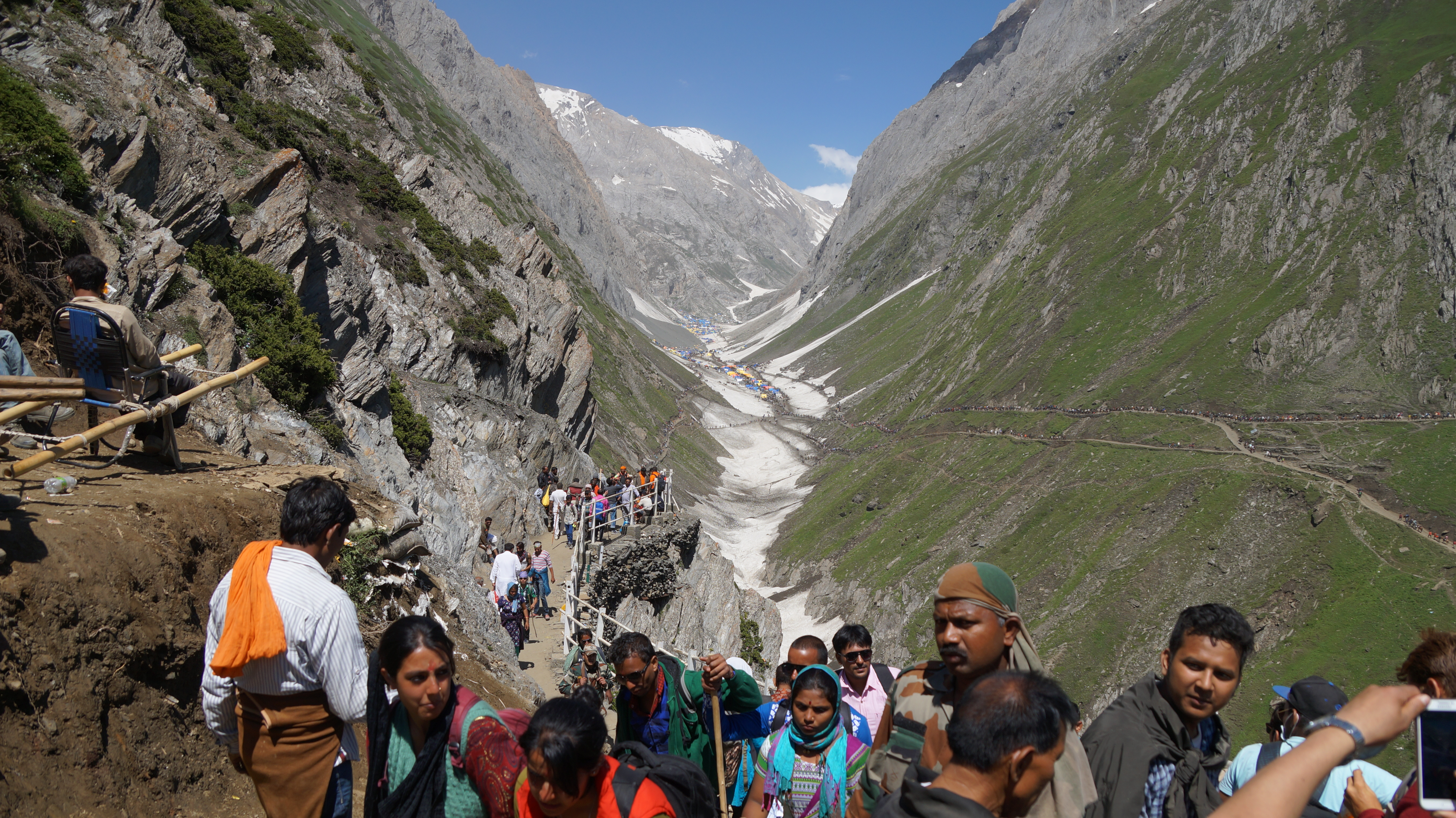
Amarnath Yatra in the glacial heights of Himalayas in the Kashmir Valley.

The 48-day July–August annual Hindu pilgrimage, undertaken by up to 600,000 or more pilgrims to the 130 feet (40 m)-high glacial Amarnath cave shrine of iced stalagmite Shiv linga at 12,756 feet (3,888 m) in Himalayas, is called Amarnath Yatra. It begins with a 43 kilometres (27 mi) mountainous trek from the Nunwan and Chandanwari base camps at Pahalgam and reaches the cave-shrine after night halts at Sheshnag Lake and Panchtarni camps.

The yatra is both a way of earning revenue by the state government by imposing tax on pilgrims, and a way of making a living for the local Shia Muslim Bakarwal-Gujjars by taking a portion of the revenue and by offering services to the Hindu pilgrims, and this source of income has been threatened by the Islamist Kashmiri Sunni militant groups who have banned and attacked the yatra numerous times, as well as by recent massacres of at least 59 people prior to July 2017 on this yatra, causing the deaths of mostly Hindu pilgrims, in addition to at least 10 Muslim civilians, and several Muslims in the security forces.

=== Previous massacres ===
Prior to this incident, Islamist terrorists attacked the Amaranath yatra at least 3 times, in 2000, 2001 and 2002, killing at least 54 Hindu pilgrims and injuring at least another 105 people, all unarmed, as well as resulting in the deaths of at least 10 Muslim civilian support service providers and at least 6 security personnel.

On 2 August 2000, Hizbul Mujahideen (designated a terrorist organisation by India, European Union and United States,) massacred at least 32 Hindu pilgrims and injured at least 60 people in a two-hour long indiscriminate shoot-out at the Nunwan base camp in Anantnag district, causing the deaths of 21 Hindu pilgrims and 7 unarmed Muslim shopkeepers as well as three security force officers. This attack on Amarnath yatra was part of the larger 1 and 2 August 2000 Kashmir massacre in 5 separate coordinated terrorist attacks that killed at least 89 (official count) to 105 people (as reported by PTI), and injured at least 62 more.

On 20 July 2001, a terrorist threw two grenades and fired indiscriminately on a pilgrim night camp at Sheshnag Lake en route Amarnath shrine, killing at least 13 and injured another 15 people. Those killed included 5 Hindu male pilgrims, 3 Hindu female pilgrims, 3 Muslim civilians providing support services to pilgrims, and 2 members of the security forces.

On 6 August 2002, terrorists from al-Mansuriyan, a front group of the Lashkar-e-Taiba, massacred 9 pilgrims and injured 30 near the Nunwan pilgrimage base camp.

On 7 July 2017, terrorists attacked a civilian bus that was on the Baltal-Jammu route where vehicles are not allowed after 7 p.m. A tyre of the bus was punctured, taking several hours to repair. Pilgrims are not allowed to travel on the route without road-opening parties and security escorts which were withdrawn at around 7:30 p.m. due to the curfew. The bus was not registered with the Amarnath shrine board. Seven pilgrims were killed and 32 others, including security forces, were injured.

== Attack ==
After the arrests of three locals described as "co-conspirators" in August 2017 who had provided logistical support to the attackers, Munir Khan, IGP (Kashmir), stated that four Lashkar-e-Taiba militants were involved in it. He said they had planned to carry out an attack a day earlier but there was no movement of CRPF or Amarnath pilgrim vehicle in isolation. He stated it was purely an act of terrorism carried out with the motive of spreading fear. He added that a pilgrim vehicle was there on the day of the attack so they attacked it, had it been a CRPF vehicle, they would have attacked it as well. He further clarified that the attack was first aimed at the police post in the area but unfortunately the bus also came under attack.

The security agencies had earlier investigated whether the bus was the target or was it incidental. Earlier according to IGP of Kashmir range Munir Khan and a statement by the Jammu and Kashmir Police, the gunmen had first attacked a police bunker in Botengo which was retaliated, without any casualties being caused in the exchange of fire. Munir added that the gunmen later attacked a police post at Khanabal with the fire being returned and the bus carrying the pilgrims being caught in the crossfire, with seven pilgrims being killed. According to the CRPF, the gunmen had first fired at a combined picket of CRPF and state police, after which they attacked the bus and later fired upon a camp at Arwani. The investigative report of the state police's CID contradicted this, suggesting that the bus was attacked by two sets of terrorists, first at a petrol pump in Batingu at 8:17 p.m and again a few minutes later after which the bus was escorted by a police patrol van to police lines in Anantnag.

The white coloured bus number plated (GJ09Z9979) at which the firing took place carried about 50 pilgrims. It was reported by the Indian media that the attack was carried out by 3-5 terrorists at the location of Khanabal. Although the bus contained more than 50 people, a larger number of casualties was prevented to a great extent due to the actions of the bus driver, Saleem Mirza. Despite the bus being fired on by the bullets in all directions, the bus driver continued driving the bus in a calm manner for about 1 km before stopping at an intersection. The Inspector General of CRPF in Kashmir, Muneer Khan, said that Lashkar-e-Taiba, allegedly founded by Hafiz Saeed was behind the attack.

Seven pilgrims from Gujarat, Maharashtra, and Telangana, including six women were killed in the attack. Another pilgrim succumbed to her injuries on 16 July.

== Aftermath ==
The bodies of the seven Amarnath pilgrims killed in the terror attack in Jammu and Kashmir were brought to Gujarat's Surat airport along with the injured and their family members in an Indian Air Force plane. The Government of Gujarat announced a compensation of ₹600,000 (US$6,200) for the relatives of every killed victims and ₹200,000 (US$2,100) for the injured victims. Subsequently, the Government of India announced compensation of ₹700,000 (US$7,300) for the killed victims and ₹100,000 (US$1,000) for the injured victims.

Jammu and Kashmir State Chief Minister paid a visit to the injured victims of the attack at the hospital. During her visit she spoke to Indian media she said the attack is a "Blot on all Muslims and Kashmiri" and the "Head of every Kashmiri hangs in shame over the incident". She further said that she have no words to condemn the terror attack.

Bus driver Saleem Mirza who was hailed as a hero due to his act of bravery spoke to Indian media and said "God gave me strength to save lives of people". The Government of Gujarat's Chief Minister Vijay Rupani thanked Mirza as he saved lives despite heavy firing. Rupani informed the Indian media that the Government of Gujarat will nominate Mirza for the bravery award with the Government of India.

Police officials stated, that the attack was carried out by Lashkar-e-Taiba and the attack was masterminded by a Pakistani terrorist named Abu Ismail, a local LeT commander who is also thought to be the future successor of Abu Dujana, Lashkar's chief commander in Kashmir. He was also assisted by some Kashmiri militants. A manhunt was launched by security forces to capture Ismail.

=== Security forces' action ===
Security forces, including J&K Police and Central Paramilitary forces of India, jointly intensified the cordon and search grid-based ongoing "Operation Hunt Down" to track and kill the LeT, Jaish-e-Mohammad and Hizbul Mujahideen terrorists placed on the identified "hit list", and had already killed 102 terrorists from 1 January to 14 July 2017, including the extermination of terrorists responsible for the killing of seven J&K Police cops and the lynching of DSP Ayub Pandith, while a colossal hunt was on for mastermind of terrorist attack on Amarnath Yatra, LeT commander Abu Ismail.

All overground workers who had provided logistic support to the terrorists had been identified by 24 July. All of them had been arrested by 27 July. Abu Ismail, the main accused, was killed along with an associate Abu Kassim on 14 September by security forces in Nowgam. Yawar Basir, Furqan and Abu Maviya were killed on 5 December.

== Reactions ==
Rediff reported the attack as the worst attack carried out on the annual pilgrimage since 2001.

The attack was condemned by many including Prime Minister of India Narendra Modi, Union Home Minister of India Rajnath Singh, Chief Minister of J&K Mehbooba Mufti, National Conference party leader Omar Abdullah. Several Organisations, such as J&K National Conference (JKNC), Indian National Congress, Vishwa Hindu Parishad, National Panthers Party, etc. condemned the attack and called for a strike in Jammu Valley in protest against the attack. Also, Mobile and Internet services were suspended in Jammu region in view of the attack as a measure to prevent any kind of rumour mongering.

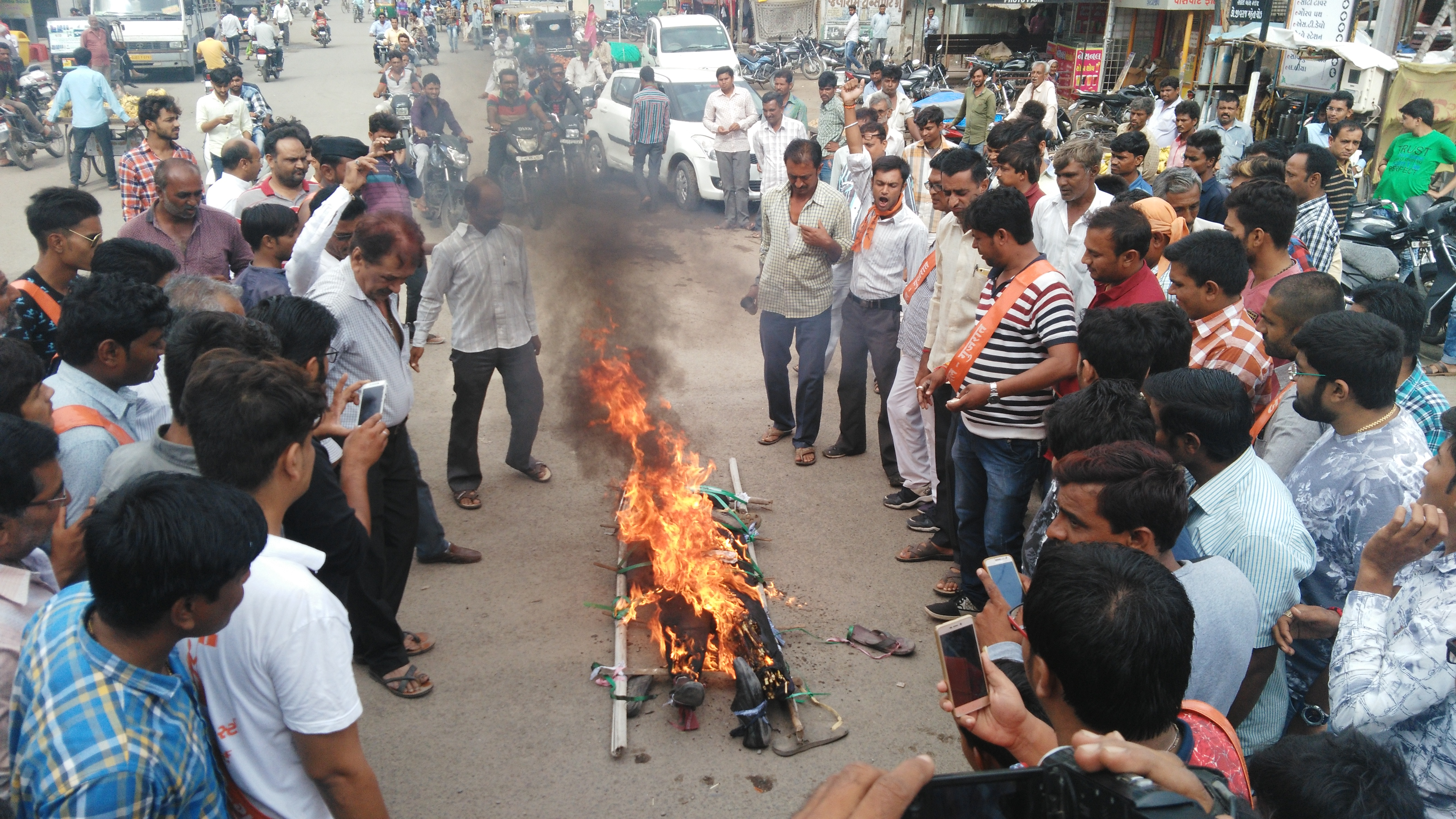
Protest in Gujarat

The local political party (Jammu and Kashmir Pradesh Congress Committee)'s president, G A Mir, condemned the attack and described it as shocking and highly shameful. More than 200 activists of the JKPCC thronged the Rehari belt of Jammu city and held protests against the killing of pilgrims. They raised anti-government and anti-BJP slogans and demanded that the government should be sacked.

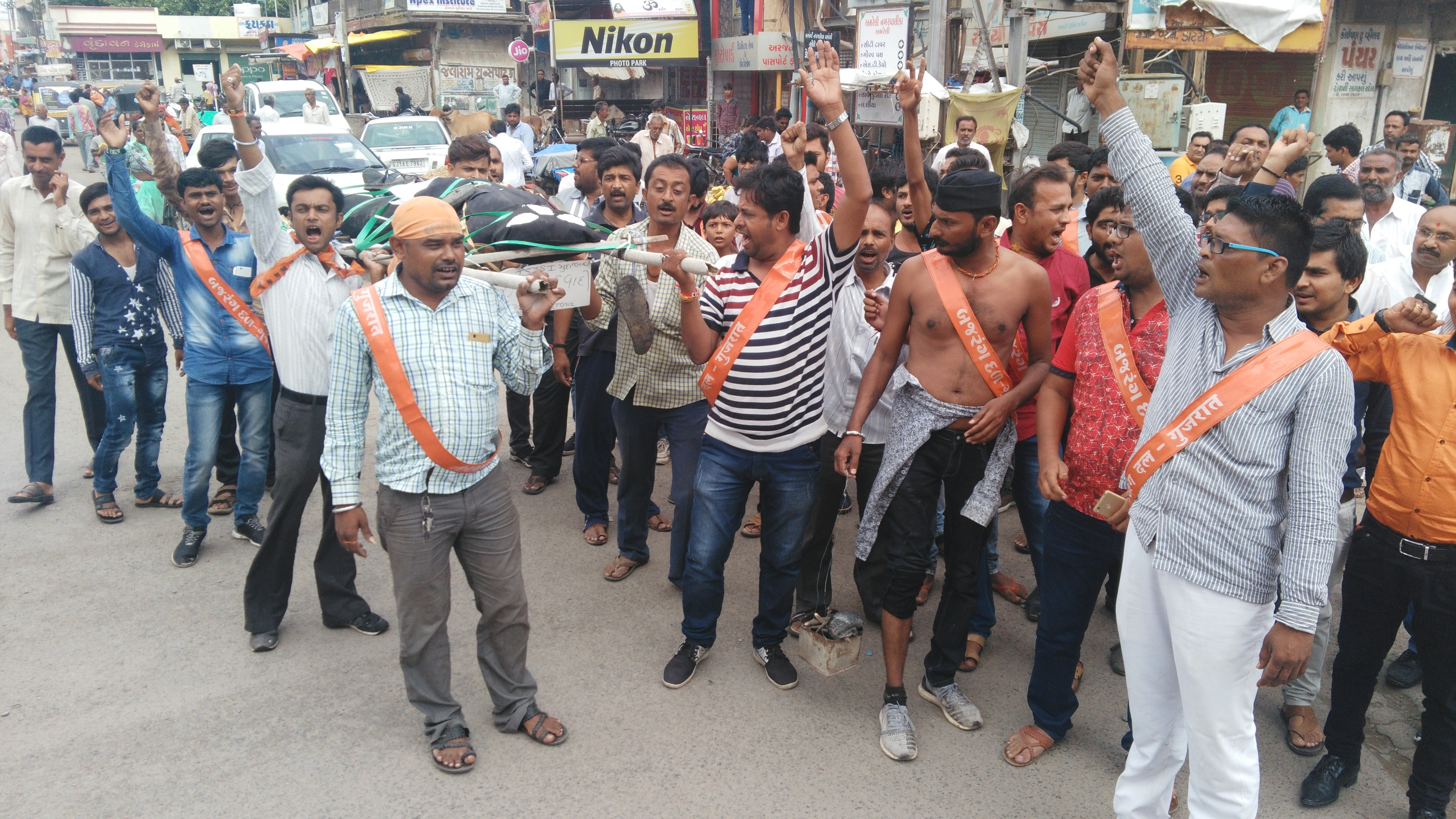
Protest in Gujarat

Protesters in the Jammu Division burnt Pakistani flags in protest of the terrorist attack. They expressed a lack of confidence in the Mehbooba Mufti government and demanded the imposition of Governor's Rule in the State. After being blamed for the attack by the police, a LeT spokesman condemned the attack and termed it un-Islamic. They denied they were involved in the attack, blaming it instead on the Indian intelligence agencies.

== See also ==
- 2000 Amarnath pilgrimage massacre
- 2003 Nadimarg massacre
- List of terrorist incidents in India
- List of massacres in India
