= Amarnath Temple =

Hindu shrine in Kashmir, India

Amarnath Cave Temple
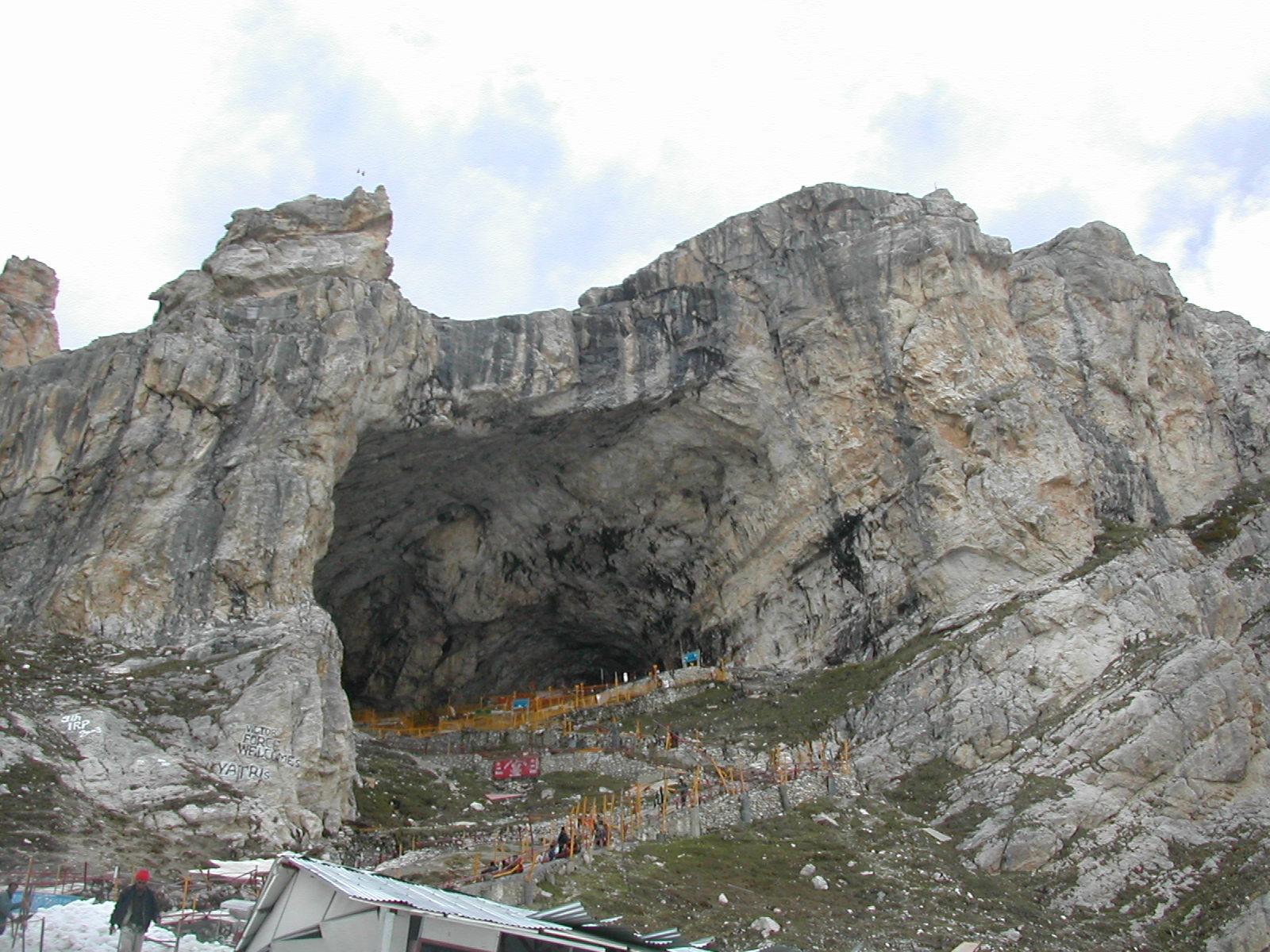
- Amarnath Cave Temple in Anantnag district (J&K)

- Location within Jammu and Kashmir Location within India

Religion
- Affiliation: Hinduism
- District: Anantnag
- Deity: Shiva
- Festival: Maha Shivaratri

Location
- Location: Pahalgam
- State: Jammu & Kashmir
- Country: India
- Interactive map of Amarnath Cave Temple
- Coordinates: 34.2149°N 75.5008°E

Architecture
- Elevation: 3,888 m (12,756 ft)

Website
- Jksasb.nic.in

Amarnath Temple is a Hindu shrine located in the Pahalgam tehsil of Anantnag district of Jammu and Kashmir, India. It is a cave situated at an altitude of 3,888 m (12,756 ft), about 72 km from Anantnag, the district headquarters, 141 km (88 mi) from Srinagar, the summer capital of Jammu and Kashmir, accessible via either Sonamarg or Pahalgam

The cave, located in the Sind Valley, is surrounded by glaciers and snow-covered mountains and remains inaccesssible for most of the year, opening to pilgrims only for a brief period in summer. In 1989, pilgrims numbered between 12,000 and 30,000. In 2011, the number reached a peak of over 6.3 lakh (630,000). In 2018, it stood at 2.85 lakh (285,000). The annual pilgrimage season varies between 20 and 60 days.

The Amarnath cave, abode of the Mahamaya Shakti Pitha, is one of the 51 Shakti Pithas, the temples of the Indian subcontinent that commemorate the supposed location of the fallen body parts of the Hindu deity Sati.

== Lingam ==
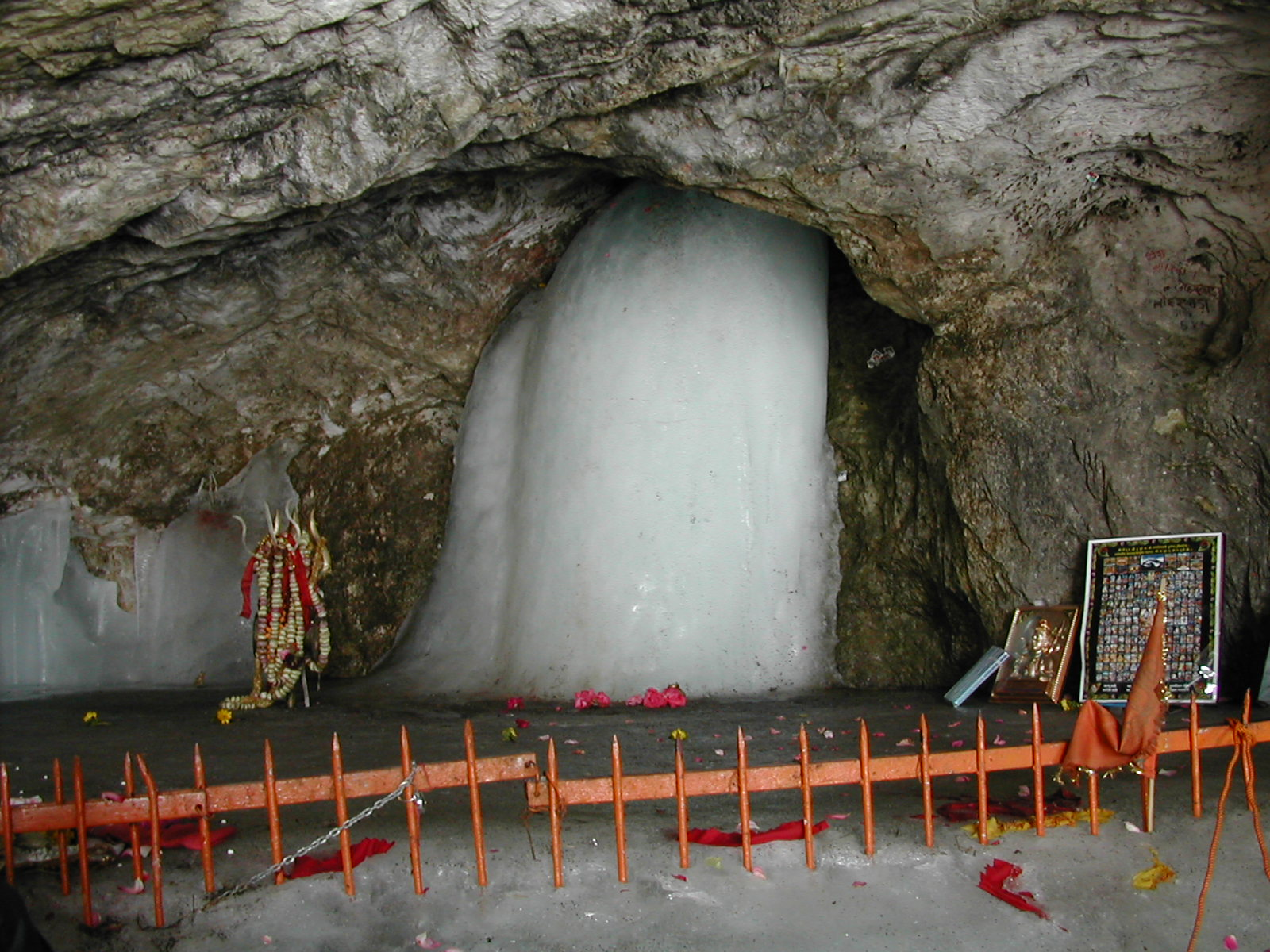
Ice lingam at the Amarnath Cave Temple

The lingam (an aniconic representation of Shiva) at the shrine is believed to be svayambhu (self-manifested). The lingam is a natural stalagmite formation inside a 40 m (130 ft) tall cave at an elevation of 3,888 m (12,756 ft) on the Amarnath Mountain, which has a peak of 5,186 metres (17,014 ft). The stalagmite is formed due to the freezing of water drops that fall from the roof of the cave onto the floor, resulting in an upward growth of an ice formation. The stalagmite, regarded as a physical manifestation of Shiva, forms a solid dome shape. Two smaller stalagmites are thought to represent his consort Parvati and son Ganesha.

The lingam waxes during May to August, as snow melts in the Himalayas above the cave, and water seeps into the rocks of the cave; thereafter, the lingam gradually wanes. Religious beliefs hold that the lingam grows and shrinks with the phases of the moon, reaching its height during the summer festival. Hindus believe this is the place where Shiva explained the secret of life and eternity to Parvati.

Lidder Valley, where the cave is located, has a number of glaciers. In 2009, glaciologist M. N. Koul, the former head of the geography department at the University of Jammu, said that while more scientific studies were needed, contributors to change in lingam size could include changes in the water's pathways to the lingam. The cave is made of limestone and gypsum. Heat generated by tourists affects the size of the stalagmite. Outside temperature changes also affect their size. To minimize artificially induced temperature changes, helicopter trips and helipad sites are regulated. There has been talk of artificially extending the life of the stalagmites; this was met with objections.

== History ==
=== Ancient history ===
The cave temple and pilgrimage are mentioned in several ancient Sanskrit texts, including the c. 6th–7th century Nilamata Purana and the 12th century chronicle Rajatarangini of Kalhana, which refer to them as Amareshvara and Amareshvara yatra. The Rajatarangini also mentions the Sheshnag Lake, which it describes as falling on the yatra route. It is believed that in the 11th century CE, Queen Suryamati gifted trishulas, banalingas and other sacred emblems to this temple.

=== Medieval history ===
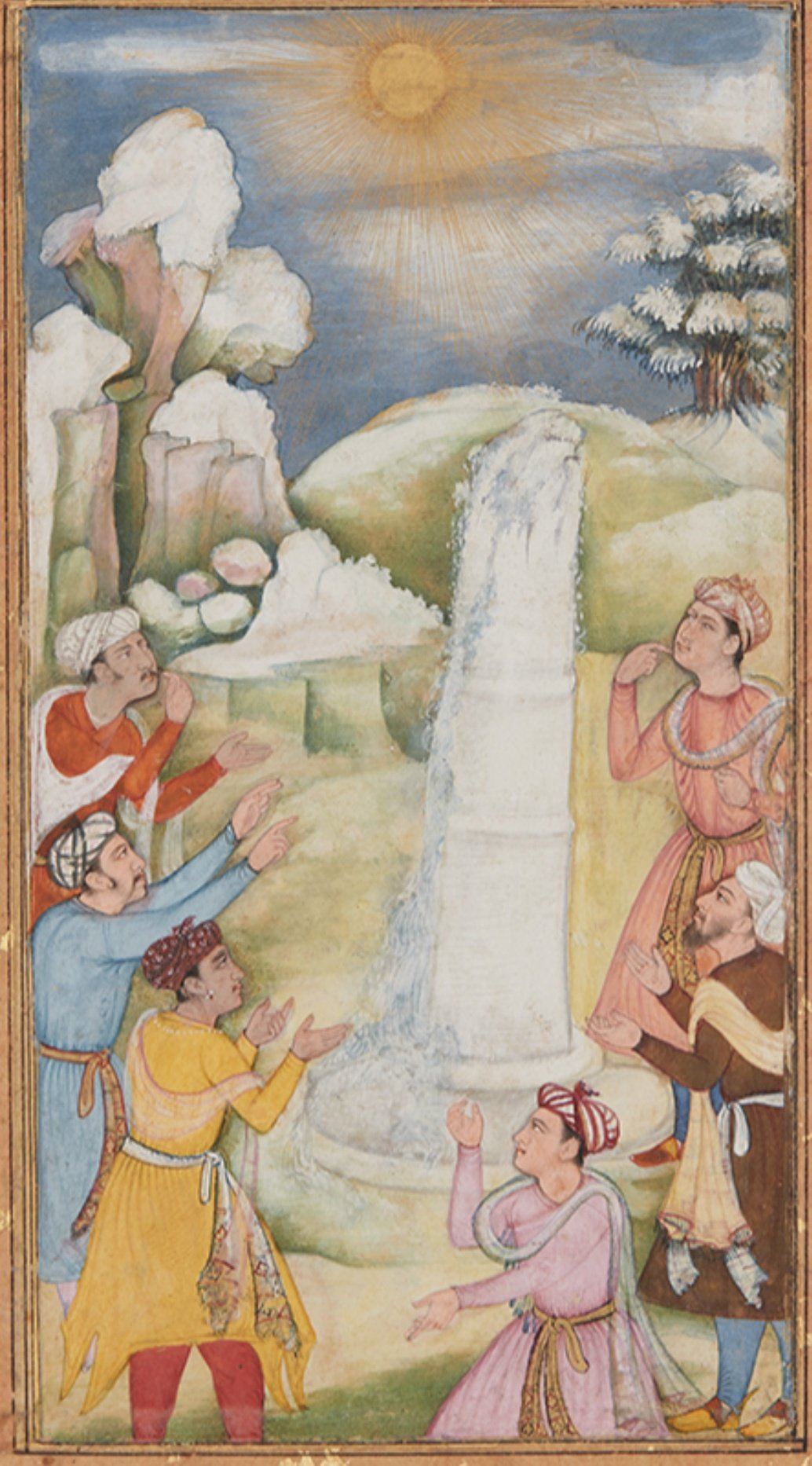
Mughal painting depicting Amarnath, c. 1600

The cave and the lingam find mention in Abu'l Fazl's 16th century work Ain-i-Akbari. According to him, the site attracted many pilgrims. He describes the waxing and waning of the lingam according to the seasons and the moon.

Between Great Tibet [i.e. Ladakh] and the above-mentioned parganah [Dachchhinpārah, in the Lidder Valley] is a cave in which is an image in ice called Amar Nāt. ... They believe it to be the image of Mahādeva and regard it as a means (through supplication) of the fulment of their desires. ... The snows of this mountainous tract nowhere melt, and from the extreme cold, the straitness of the defiles and the rough inequalities of the road, they are surmounted with great toil.

— Abul Fazl, Ain-i-Akbari (c. 16th century)

François Bernier, a French physician, accompanied Emperor Aurangzeb during his visit to Kashmir in 1663. In his book Travels in Mughal Empire, he provides an account of the places he visited, noting that he was "pursuing journey to a grotto full of wonderful congelations, two days journey from Sangsafed" when he "received intelligence that my Nawab felt very impatient and uneasy on account of my long absence." The "grotto" referenced in this passage is the Amarnath cave — as the editor of the second edition of the English translation of the book, Vincent A. Smith, makes clear in his introduction. He writes: "The grotto full of wonderful congelations is the Amarnath cave, where blocks of ice, stalagmites formed by dripping water from the roof are worshipped by many Hindus who resort here as images of Shiva...."

=== Modern history ===
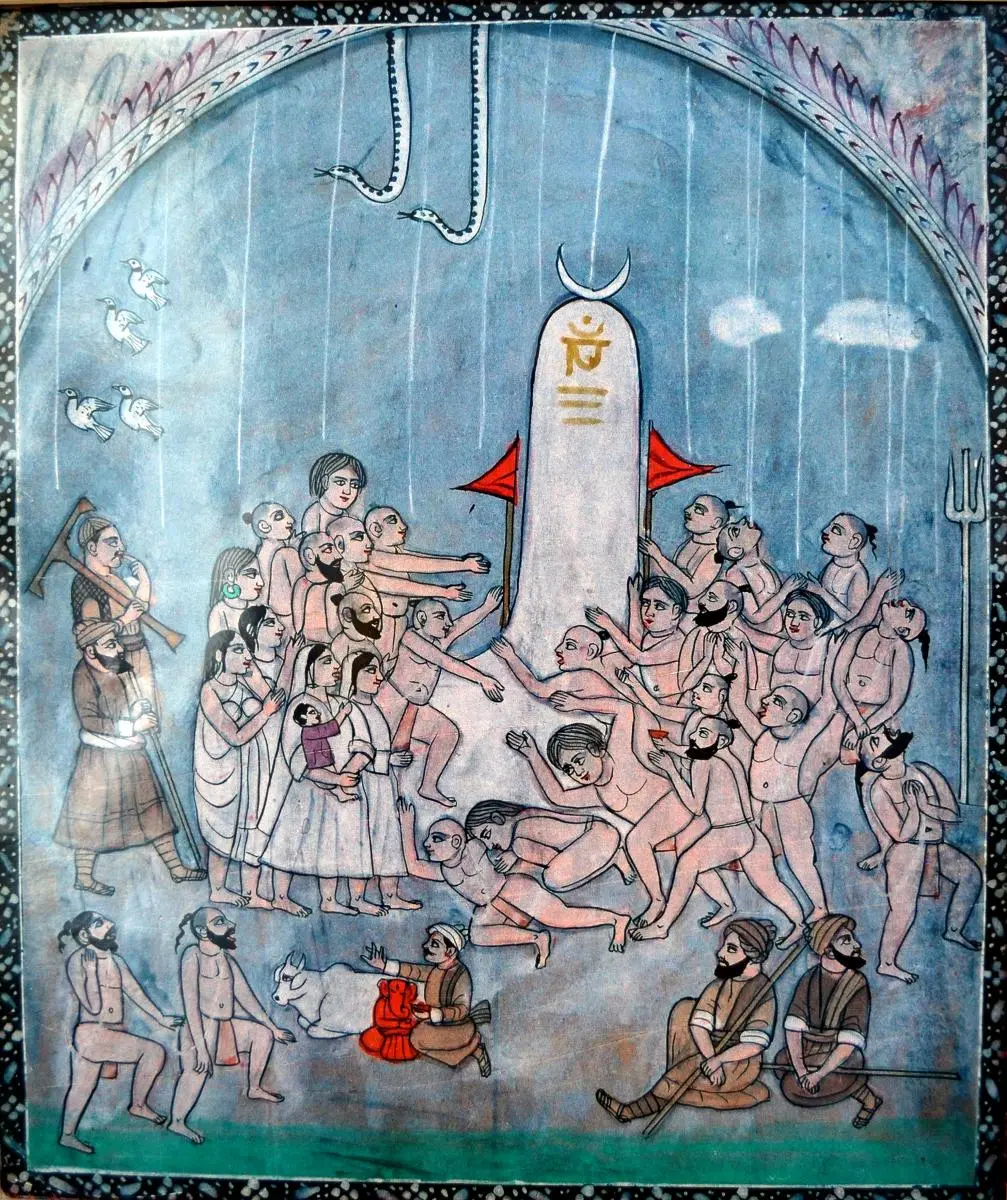
Painting of devotees in the Amarnath cave temple. Jammu, Pahari, circa mid-19th century

In 1895, pilgrims would first travel to Kheer Bhawani for a brief stop. Sustained by free rations from the state, the pilgrims would then travel to Srinagar. From Srinagar, in batches, the pilgrims would then head up Lidder Valley, stopping at locations for holy dips. At Mach Bawan, local Hindus would join them. Maliks of Batkoot were responsible for the route during these years. Sister Nivedita, in Notes of Some Wanderings with the Swami Vivekananda, writes of Swami Vivekananda's visit to the cave in 1898.

=== Medieval chronicles ===
The earliest medieval references to the Amarnath cave shrine and its associated pilgrimage are found in Kalhana's 12th-century Sanskrit chronicle the Rajtarangini (River of Kings), composed between 1148 and 1149 CE and regarded as the oldest and most important historical record of Kashmir.

The Rajatarangini refers to the shrine consistently under the name Amareshvara and the annual pilgrimage as the Amreshvara Yatra. Book - I of the chronicle (verse 67) makes it clear that the pilgrimage to Amareshvara was an established and recognised institution in Kalhana's own time. The reference is introduced in a legendary context, where a tank is described as being visible only during the festival of Amareshvara Yatra, establishing the pilgrimage as a well-known seasonal event against which local landmarks were measured.

A more historically specific reference appears in Book - VII (verse 183) of the chronicle, which records that Queen Suryamati, the consort of King Ananta of Kashmir (r.c.1028 - 1063 CE), erected two temples - one named Vijayeshwara and one named Amareshwara - and that in the latter she installed Trishulas (tridents), Banalingas, and other sacred emblems of Shiva.

Kalhana also records the route to the shrine in the Broader context of Kashmir's sacred geography, mentioning Sheshnag Lake as a landmark associated with the Amareshvara Yatra. This confirms that the route followed waypoints as the modern southern route via Pahalgam.

== Legends ==
According to legend, Sage Bhrigu was the first to discover Amarnath. A long time ago, it is believed that the Valley of Kashmir was underwater, and Sage Kashyapa drained it through a series of rivers and rivulets. As a result, when the waters drained, Bhrigu was the first to have a darshan (theophany) of Shiva at Amarnath. Thereafter, when people heard of the lingam, it became an abode of Shiva for all believers and the site of an annual pilgrimage, traditionally performed by lakhs of people in July and August during the Hindu holy month of Savan.

According to regional legend, Shiva renounced his worldly attributes along the route to the Amarnath Cave: his bull-mount Nandi at Pahalgam, his crescent at Chandanwari, his serpent Vasuki at Lake Sheshnag, his son Ganesha at Mahagunas Parvat, and the panchabhuta (five elements) at Panjtarni. After performing the tandava dance to mark his detachment from the world, Shiva entered the cave with Parvati, where they manifested as the ice lingam.

== Yatra (pilgrimage) details and routes ==
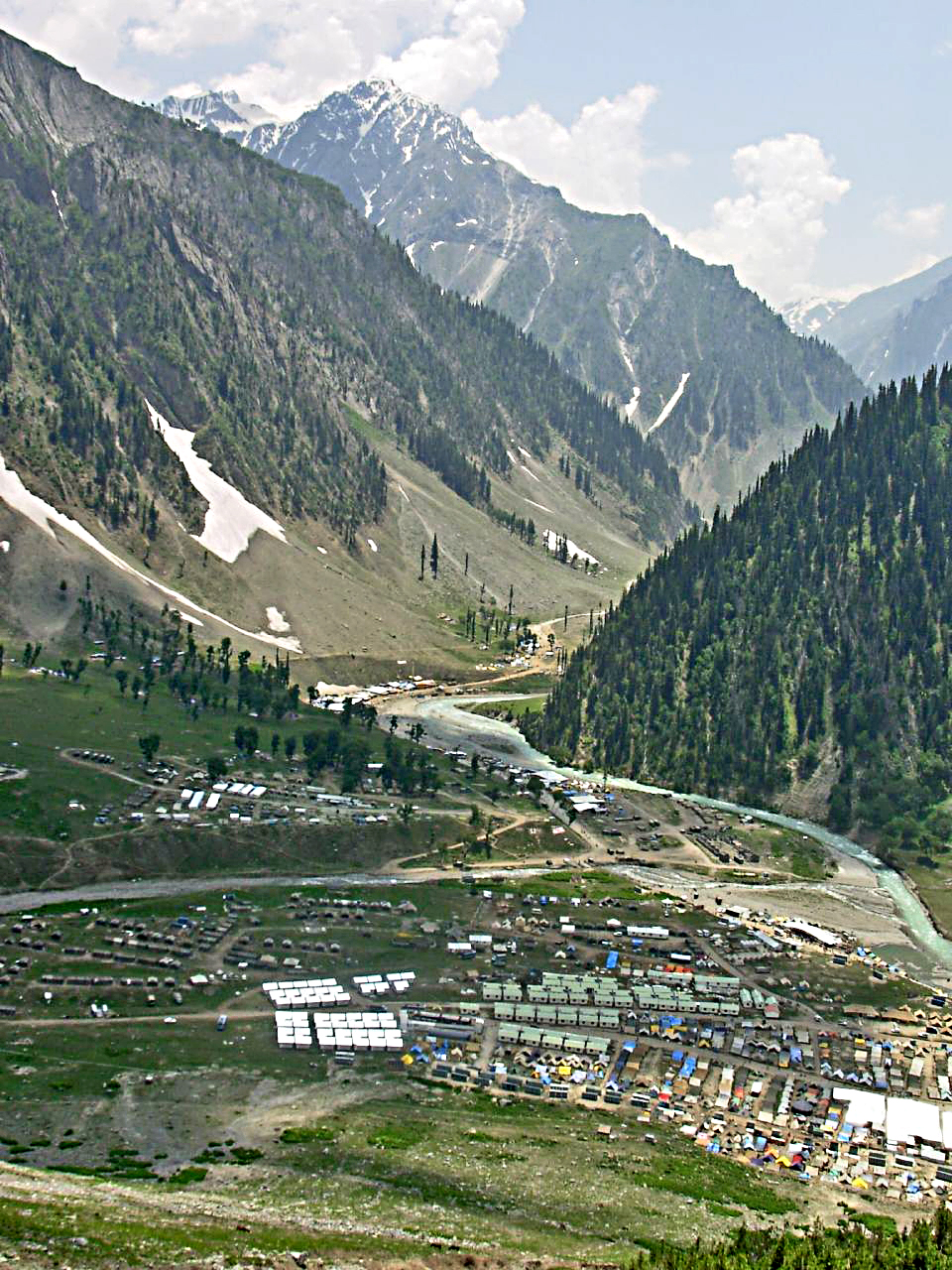
Amarnath Yatra Camp

=== Pilgrimage opening timeframe: July–August during ice lingam formation ===
Pilgrims visit the holy site during the 45-day season around the festival of Shravani Mela in July–August, coinciding with the Hindu holy month of Shraavana. The Amarnath Yatra pilgrimage occurs when the iced stalagmite Shiva lingam reaches the apex of its waxing phase through the summer months. The period of July–August is a popular time for the pilgrimage. The beginning of the annual pilgrimage is marked by pratham pujan (transl. first prayer).

The time frame, during which the pilgrimage remains open, depends on the formation of iced lingam. For example, in 1995 the pilgrimage remained open for 20 days. From 2004 to 2009, it remained open for 60 days. During the following years, it remained open for between 40 and 60 days. In 2019, the Yatra remained open for 46 days from 1 July to 15 August.

=== State quotas and mandatory pilgrim pre-registration & e-tracking ===
Pilgrims have to pre-register months in advance and are allotted quotas according to state. States comprising a majority of the allotment include Uttar Pradesh, Punjab, Gujarat, Maharashtra and West Bengal. To ensure the health and safety of the pilgrims, such as during a disaster or medical emergency, each pilgrim and vehicle is given a unique wearable traceable identification tag which are scanned at the several designated places along the pilgrim route. Since 2019, pilgrims are given identification cards for the duration of the pilgrimage which are scanned at several locations for tracing the pilgrims. Similarly, the vehicles are also tracked via the tags, so that the entire pilgrimage can be traced.

=== Transport and roads ===
Nearest airport is Srinagar International Airport. Nearest railway stations are on the Jammu-Baramulla line - Srinagar railway station for the north pilgrim route through Baltal and Anantnag railway station for the south route via Pahalgam-Chandanwari. The State Road Transport Corporation and private transport operators provide the regular services from Jammu to Pahalgam and Baltal. Also privately hired taxis are available from Jammu, Anantnag, Pahalgam, Srinagar, etc.

On the south route via Pahalgam-Chandanwari, the helicopter services from Chandanwari base camp to Panjtarni (6 km from the cave) are also available from various private operators.

Chandanwari-Sangam Highway as part of NH501, including 11 km-long Khanabal-Baltal Tunnel (Sheshnag Tunnel) under the Mahaganus Top (Ganesh Top), is the 22 km-long greenfield section of the national highway on the South Route which will connect the South and North yatra routes via the highway tunnel. In January 2023, MoRTH's NHIDCL invited RFP submissions by vendors by 20 February 2023 for preparation of DPR (detailed project report) which will take 10 months to prepare, subsequently after 2 months long pre-construction preparation the construction will take 5 years, with the target completion date of 31 March 2029 (total 6 years).

=== Two main routes ===
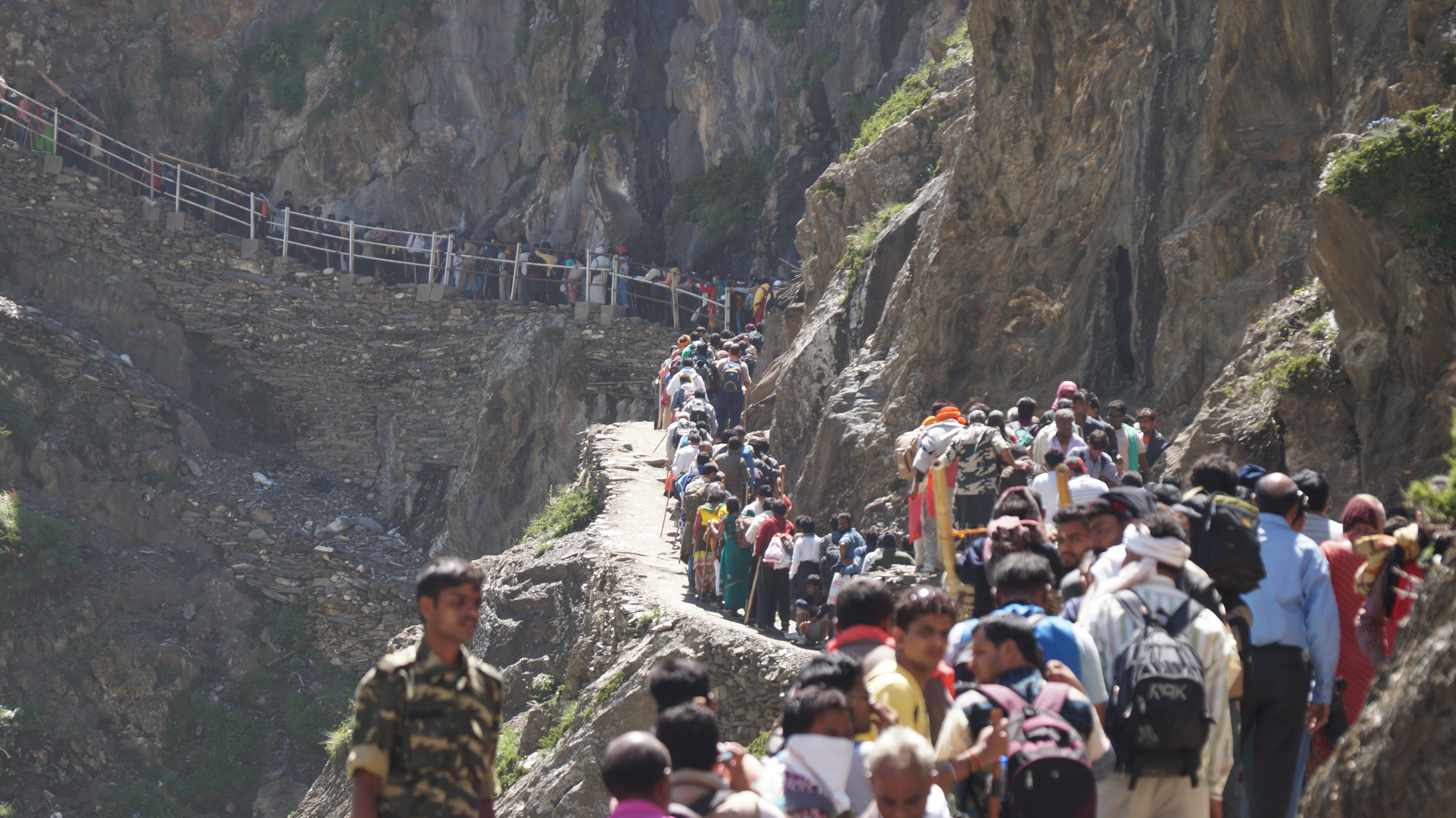
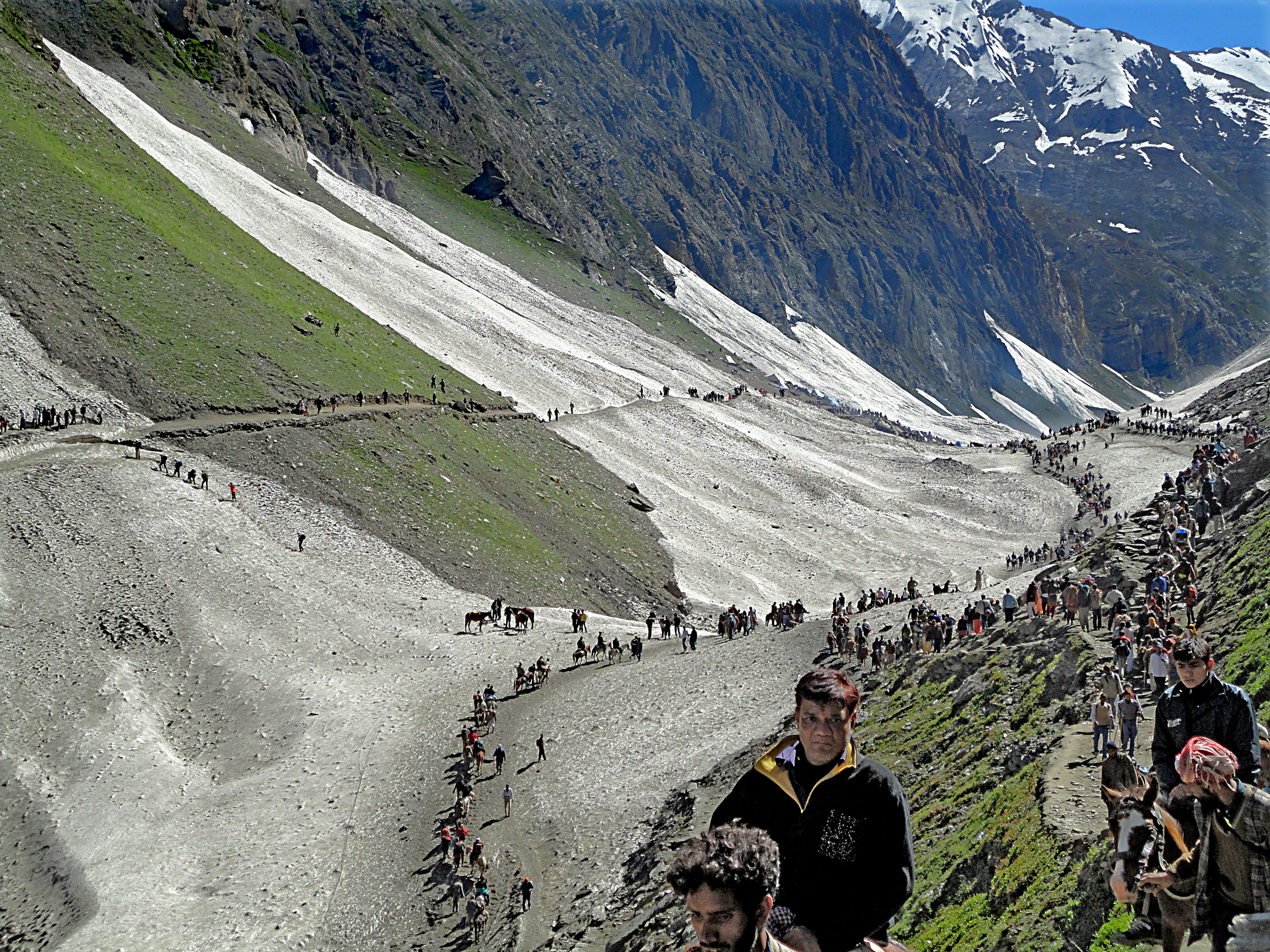
Pilgrims en route to Amarnath

Devotees travel on two main routes which are partially motorable and partially foot-track near to the holy cave: the shorter but steeper 13 km northern route from Baltal Basecamp, and the longer but easier and busier 43 km Pahalgam-Chandanwari basecamp route.

==== South route – 43 km: Pahalgam-Chandanwari route ====
Amarnath route

It begins with a 43 kilometres (27 mi) mountainous trek from the Nunwan and Chandanwari basecamp at Pahalgam and reaches the cave-shrine after night halts at Sheshnag Lake and Panchtarni camps. The journey from Pahalgam takes about five days. It runs from Pahalgam (on Jammu-Srinagar NH) to Chandanwari Basecamp (9,500 ft) – 16 km, Pissu Top – 3 km, Zoji Bal-Naga Koti-Sheshnag (11,730 ft) – 9 km, Waribal-Mahaguns Yop (Ganesh Top, 14,500 ft) – 4.6 km, Rabibal-Panchtarni (22,729 ft)-Sangam (T-section for North route via Baltal) – 6 km, Amarnath cave – 3 km. The whole foot track route takes three to five days one way.

The route is motorable up to Chandanwari, which will become motorable up to Sangam after construction of NH501 Chandanwari-Baltal Highway which includes Khanabal-Baltal Tunnel (Sheshnag Tunnel) under the Mahaganus Top (Ganesh Top), see "Transport" section above. Once completed, all the route will become motorable except the last 3 km from Sangam to Amarnath cave.

==== North route – 13 km: Baltal route and ropeway ====
It runs from Baltal basecamp to Domail – 2 km, Barari – 5 km, Sangam (T-section for South route via Pahalgam-Chandanwari) – 4 km, Amarnath cave - 3 km. This track is motorable till Baltal and Baltal-Amarnath foot track takes one to two days return trip. Once the NH501 from Pahalgam-Chandanwari to Baltal is completed, including Sheshnag-Sangam tunnel under the Mahaguns Top (Ganesh Top), this route will become motorable except the last 3 km from Sangam to Amarnath cave. This shorter route is just about 14 km long, but has a very steep gradient and is quite difficult to climb. The route is along the Amarnath valley and all along the route one can see the Amaravati river (a tributary of Chenab) which originates from the Amarnath Glacier.

Amarnath ropeway, 11.60 km long ropeway planned from Baltal to Amarnath Temple, tender for DPR were issued by March 2025.

==== Ancient route: Awantipur-Pissu Top-Sheshnag-Panchtarni ====
Bhrigu's Amarnath Mahatmya identifies a number of locations on the pilgrimage route to the Amarnath cave: Shurahyar, Shivpora, Pandrethan, Pampore, Javati, Awantipur, Barsu, Jaubror, Belihar, Wagahama, Chakreshwar (Tsakdar), Hari Chandar, Sthalwat (Thajwor), Suryai Gohwat (Sriguphvara), Lambodari, Sirham, Bodrus, Bala Khelyan, Ganish, Mammaleshwar, Bhrigupati Kshetra, Nila Ganga, Pissu Hill (Pissu Top), Sheshnag, Wavjan, Panchtarni, Amravati. On the return journey Mamleshwar and Naudal are crossed. Following the construction of drivable road, alignment of this pilgrimage route has presently changed at some places (which has now become "South route" - see above).

=== Organisation and facilities ===
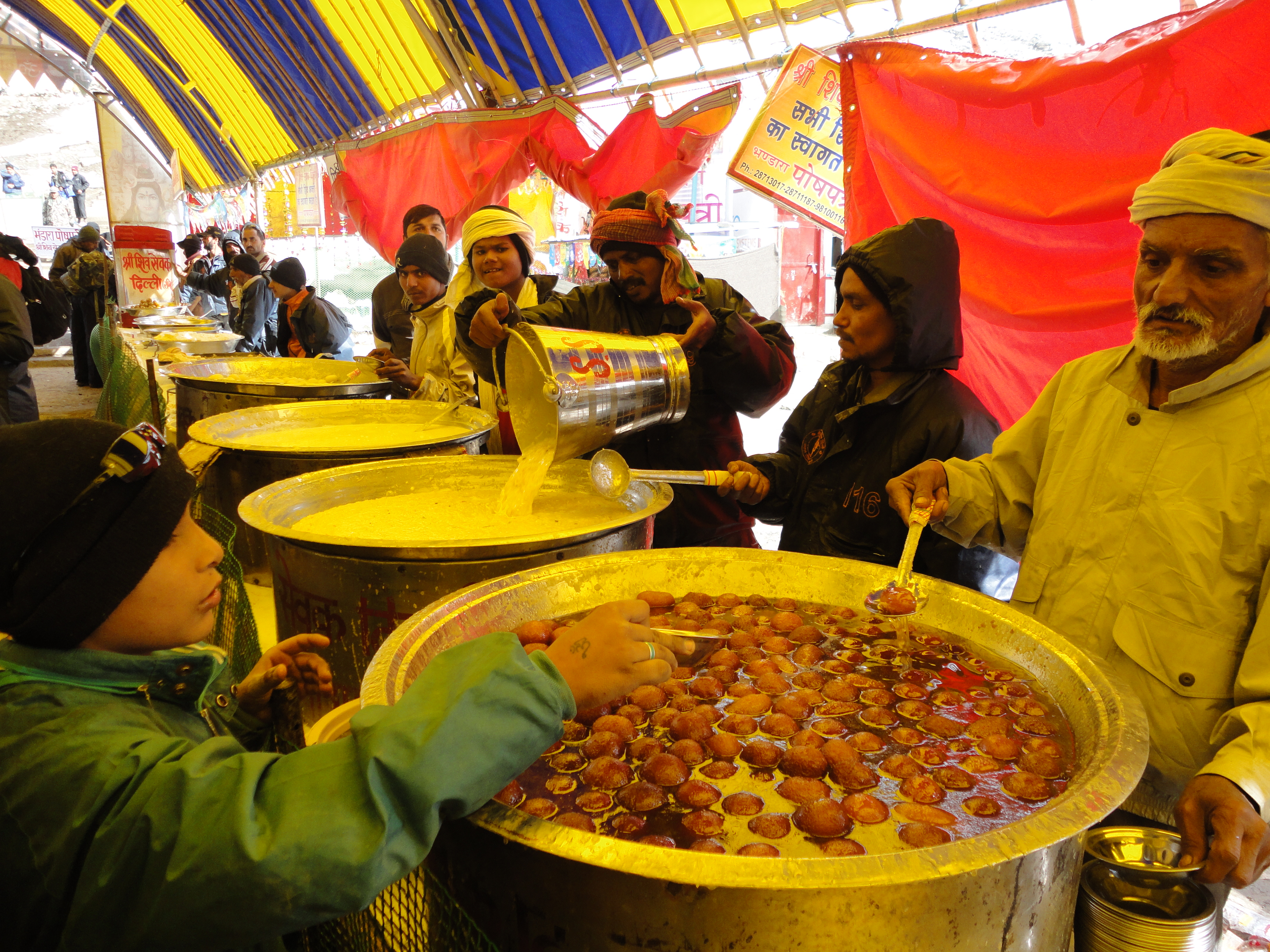
Pandal tents serving free community kitchen food to the pilgrims on Pahalgam–Chandanwari route

Officially, the Yatra is organised by the government in collaboration with the Shree Amarnath Shrine Board (SASB). Various agencies provide necessary facilities all along the route during the Yatra period, which includes provision of ponies, supply of power, telecommunication facilities, firewood and setting up of fair price shops.

En route to the cave, various non-governmental organisations have set up food supply and resting tents called pandals which are available for free to the pilgrims. Near the shrine, hundreds of tents which are erected by locals can be hired for a night's stay.

Srinagar Pilgrimage Centre, with capacity to host 3000 yatris, facilitates pilgrims' stay who are travelling for the holy pilgrimage. The state government began its construction in May 2022.

=== Security of pilgrims ===
Every year, thousands of central armed forces and state police personnel are deployed to provide security to pilgrims from potential terror threats. The forces position at various halts and also on the perimeter of the shrine. These include CRPF, BSF, CISF, ITBP, NDRF/SDRF and state police and traffic police.

=== Economic impact of yatra ===
The yatra is a source of revenue for the state government by imposing tax on pilgrims. Local Muslim Bakarwal-Gujjars also make a living by offering services to the Hindu pilgrims. This source of income has been threatened by the militant groups who have harassed and attacked the yatra numerous times.

=== Annual number of pilgrims ===
The number of annual pilgrims has generally risen consistently from between 12,000-20,000-30,000 in 1989, to over 400,000 in 2007, 634,000 in 2011, 622,000 in 2012, 350,000 in 2013, 285,006 in 2018.

Figures and estimates (*) of pilgrims to Amarnath, and duration
| Year | Pilgrims | Days | Ref | Year | Pilgrims | Days | Ref | Year | Pilgrims | Days | Ref |
|---|---|---|---|---|---|---|---|---|---|---|---|
| 2021 | — | | | 2009 | 381,000 | 60 | | 1997 | 79,035 | | |
| 2020 | — | | | 2008 | 533,000 | 60 | | 1996 | | | |
| 2019 | 342,883 | 45 | | 2007 | 214,000/ 296,000 | 60 | | 1995 | 70,000 | 20 | |
| 2018 | 285,006 | | | 2006 | 265,000/ 347,000 | 60 | | 1994 | | | |
| 2017 | 260,003 | | | 2005 | 388,000 | 60 | | 1993 | 75,000* | | |
| 2016 | 220,490 | | | 2004 | 400,000 | 60 | | 1992 | 50,000* | | |
| 2015 | 352,771 | 60 | | 2003 | 153,314 | 30 | | 1991 | 30,000* | | |
| 2014 | 372,000 | | | 2002 | 110,793 | 30 | | 1990 | 4,000* | | |
| 2013 | 353,000 | 55 | | 2001 | 119,037 | | | 1989 | 12,000-40,000* | | |
| 2012 | 622,000 | | | 2000 | 173,334 | 30 | | Source: Duration | | | |
| 2011 | 634,000 | | | 1999 | 114,366 | 40 | | Source: Duration | | | |
| 2010 | 455,000 | | | 1998 | 149,920 | | | Source: Duration | | | |

== Incidents ==
=== Deaths due to health, accidents and disasters ===
Sir Walter Roper Lawrence in The Valley of Kashmir (1895) writes that the difficulty of the pilgrimage route affected the weak and sick, with many also falling victim to cholera. In 1928, over 500 pilgrims and mules died on the way to the cave. In 1969 a cloudburst resulted in the death of 40 pilgrims. The 1996 Amarnath Yatra tragedy involved the death of 243 pilgrims due to exhaustion and exposure. In July 2012, 12 pilgrims were killed in a road accident. The pilgrims were part of a team who had set up a community kitchen at the pilgrimage. Three people were killed and more injured due to a cloudburst at Baltal in 2015. Of the 622,000 yatra pilgrims in 2012, 130 died during the yatra. The major cause was attributed to people who were not physically fit for the arduous climb, high elevations, and adverse weather undertaking the yatra. Some also died in road accidents before reaching the base camp from where the yatra starts. Of the 130 deaths, 88 were due to purported health reasons and 42 in road accidents. On 16 July 2017, 18 pilgrims died and many were seriously injured after a JKSRTC bus, which was plying from Jammu city to Pahalgam as part of an Amarnath Yatra convoy, fell into a 150-ft deep gorge near Nachlana area of Jammu's Ramban district around 1:45 pm. 16 pilgrims had died on the spot, while two succumbed later to their injuries. This accident happened less than a week after a deadly terrorist attack on a bus carrying Amarnath Yatra pilgrims from Gujarat.

On 8 July 2022, at around 5:30 pm, flash floods due to a localised cloudburst near the holy cave shrine washed away scores of pilgrims. According to reports, at least fifteen pilgrims died in the incident. Jammu and Kashmir lieutenant-governor Manoj Sinha announced compensation of Rs 5 lakh each to the families of the 15 pilgrims who died in the flash floods.

=== Terror attacks and massacres ===
The first threat targeted against Amarnath pilgrims was in 1993; that year Pakistan-based Harkat-ul-Ansar had announced a ban due to demolition of Babri Masjid in the previous year. The pilgrimage however was mostly peaceful. The Harkat-ul-Mujahideen group imposed what it called a "ban" on the yatra in 1994, 1995 and 1998 while threatening the pilgrims with "serious consequences"; however the pilgrimage did continue.

==== 2000 massacre ====
On 2 August 2000, militants attacked the Nunwan base camp in Pahalgam. Thirty-two people, including 21 unarmed Hindu pilgrims, seven unarmed Muslim civilians and three security force officers were killed in a two-hour-long indiscriminate shooting. Among the dead were mostly pilgrims, porters, and horsemen who were ferrying pilgrims. This attack was part of the larger 1–2 August 2000 Kashmir massacre in five separate coordinated terrorist attacks that killed between 89 (official count) and 105 people (as reported by PTI), and injured at least 62 more. Then Indian Prime Minister Atal Bihari Vajpayee blamed Lashkar-e-Taiba for the killings.

==== 2001 massacre ====
On 20 July 2001, a terrorist threw a grenade on a pilgrim night camp at Sheshnag near the Amarnath shrine and at least 13 people, including three women, were killed in two explosions and firing by militants; two were security officials and three were Muslim civilians. 15 others were also injured in the attack.

==== 2002 massacre ====
On 30 July and 6 August 2002, in two separate incidents terrorists from al-Mansuriyan, a front group of Lashkar-e-Taiba, massacred two and nine pilgrims and injured three and 27 people in Srinagar and near Nunwan pilgrimage base camp respectively.

==== 2017 massacre ====
Eight Hindu pilgrims were killed on 10 July in a gun attack returning from Amarnath. The Pakistani outfit Lashkar-e-Taiba was found responsible.

== Controversies ==
=== 2008 land transfer controversy ===
On 26 May 2008, the Government of India and the state government of Jammu and Kashmir reached an agreement to transfer 100 acres (0.40 km^{2}) of forest land to the Shri Amarnathji Shrine Board (SASB) to set up temporary shelters and facilities for Hindu pilgrims. Kashmiri separatists opposed the move citing reasons that it would jeopardise Article 370 (abrogated by India in 2019) that gave separate identity to the people of Jammu and Kashmir and prevented any Indian citizen settling in Kashmir. Kashmiri separatists staged widespread protests against this decision by the government of India. Due to the protests, the J&K State government relented and reversed the decision to transfer land. As a result, Dogra-Pahadi Hindus in the Jammu division launched counter-agitations against this roll back. In 2019, India abrogated the article 370 and fully integrated Jammu and Kashmir with India with at par rights for all.

=== Environmental impact ===
Environmentalists have expressed concern that the number of people participating in the Amarnath Yatra is having a negative impact on the area's ecology and some have expressed support for government regulated limits on the number of pilgrims permitted to make the trek. However, no studies have been made, nor has an environmental impact assessment been carried out. The Government of India restricts travelers only on the basis on logistics, time window for the yatra and weather.

=== Amarnath Cave Temple Yatra tax controversy ===
The Government of Jammu and Kashmir had in 2010 issued a notification under the State Motor Vehicle Taxation Act 1957, under which vehicles going to Amarnath Yatra will have to pay a tax of ₹ 2,000 for seven days and ₹ 2,000 per day after that. Similar provisions were made for pilgrims going to Sri Mata Vaishno Devi under which they need to pay ₹ 2000 for a period of three days. India's largest political party the Bharatiya Janata Party expressed its ire over imposition of entry fee and accused the then UPA led central government to direct the Jammu and Kashmir dispensation to desist from making attempts to "discriminate" between followers of various religions. The BJP criticised the decision as "reminiscent of Jizya imposed during [the] Mughal period on Hindus".

In response to the question in Lok Sabha, then Minister of State for Finance, S. S. Palanimanickam clarified that tax is levied on all India Tourist Vehicles entering the state and it was therefore not correct to say that the Government of Jammu & Kashmir was levying any additional tax on vehicles going to Amarnath and Vaishno Devi. He also said that Taxation of Motor vehicles falls under the purview of State Governments as per the seventh schedule of the Constitution of India and Central Government cannot direct the State Government to change the tax rate on vehicles.

== Gallery ==
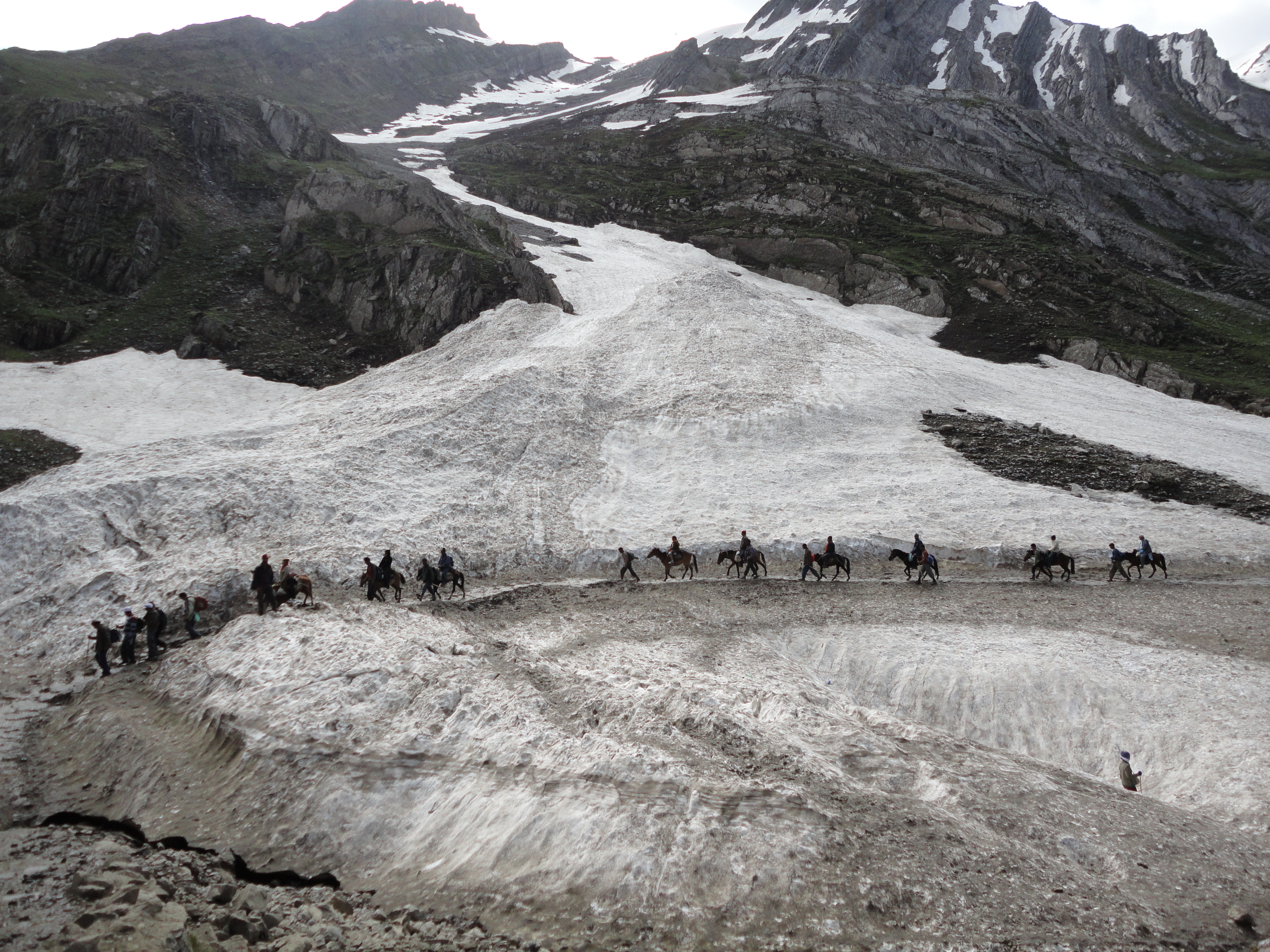
Pilgrims riding ponies on the way to the Amarnath Cave Temple

On the way to the Amarnath Cave Temple

Helicopter service up to panjtarni en route to the Amarnath Cave Temple

Tents are available to hire for a small fee near the base of the imposing Amarnath Cave as visible in the background.

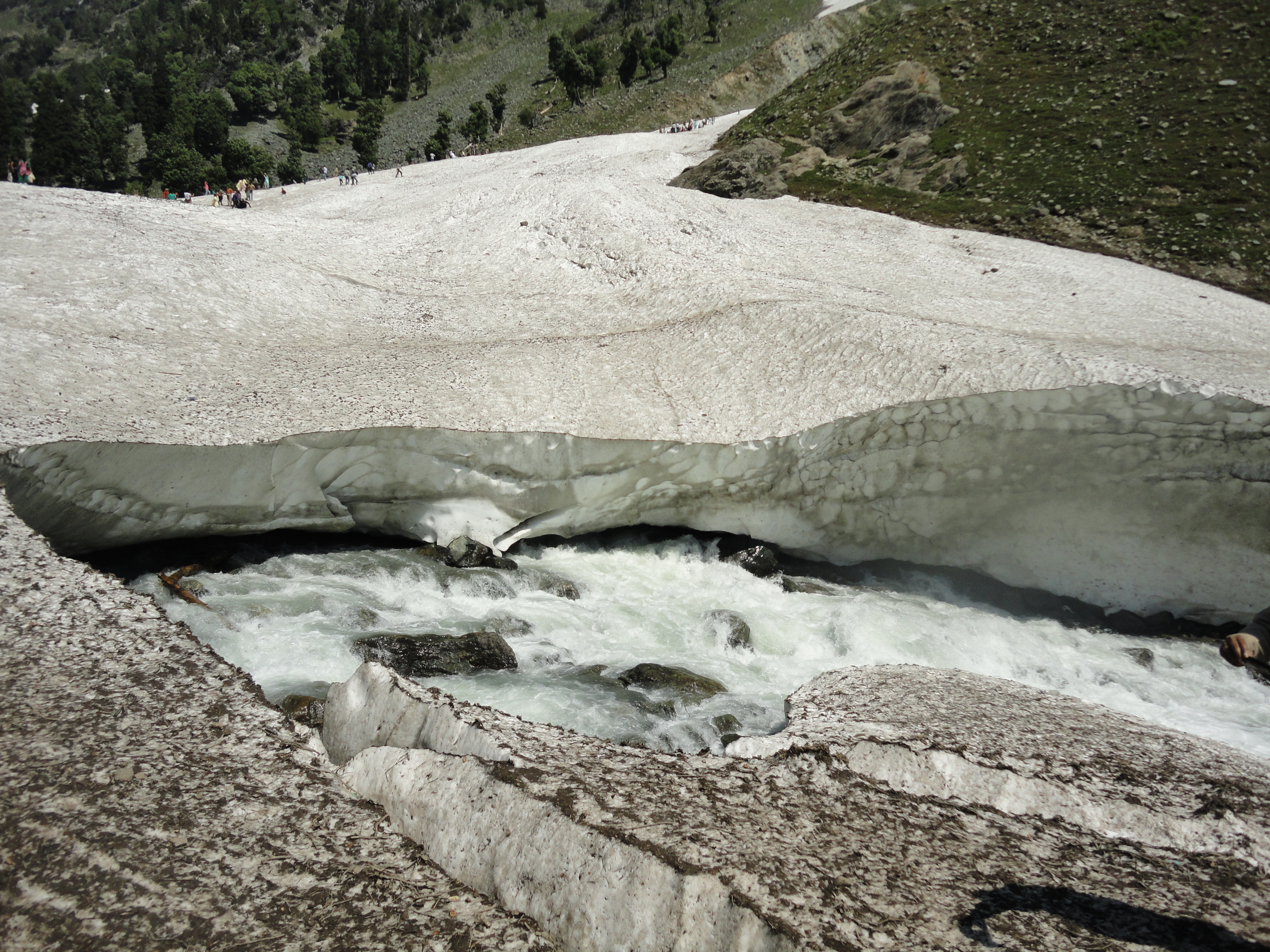
Glacier over Lidder River in Chandanwari on the way to the Amarnath Cave Temple

== See also ==
- Kanwar Yatra – another popular Hindu pilgrimage
- List of caves § India
- List of rock-cut temples in India
