= Nachlana railway station =

Railway station in India

General information
- Location: Nachlana, Jammu and Kashmir; India
- Elevation: 1,586 metres (5,203 ft)
- System: Indian Railways station
- Owner: Indian Railways
- Operator: Northern Railway
- Line: Banihal–Katra Line
- Platforms: 2
- Tracks: 2

Construction
- Structure type: Standard (on-ground station)
- Parking: No
- Cycle facilities: No

Other information
- Status: Proposed
- Station code: NCLNA
- Zone(s): Northern Railway
- Division(s): Firozpur

History
- Opened: TBA

Services
Preceding station	Indian Railways	Following station
Banihal towards ?	Northern Railway zone Banihal–Katra line	Sangaldan towards ?

Nachlana railway station is a proposed railway station in Ramban district, Jammu and Kashmir, India. Its code is NCLNA. It will serve Nachlana village. The station proposal includes two platforms. The station lies on Banihal–Katra rail line. The work on this rail line is expected to be finished in the year 2020. The station is surrounded by many of long tunnels of Jammu–Baramulla line.
