= National Highway 501 (India) =

National highway in India

National Highway 501
- Map of the National Highway in red
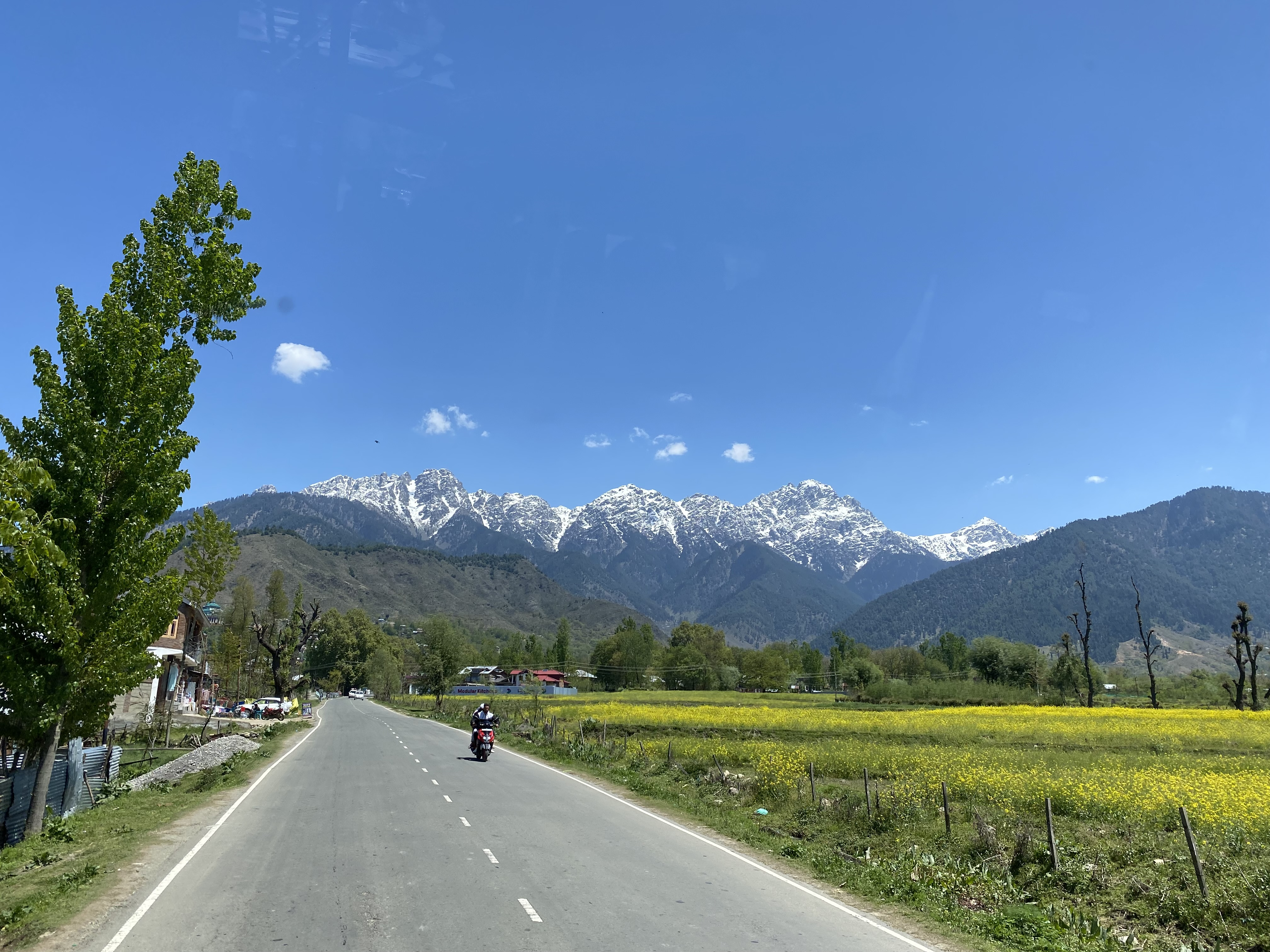
- NH 501 in Anantnag district in 2023

Route information
- Auxiliary route of NH 1
- Maintained by NHAI
- Length: 90 km (56 mi)

Major junctions
- North end: NH 1, Panchtarni
- South end: NH 44 in Khanabal

Location
- Country: India
- States: Jammu and Kashmir
- Primary destinations: Panchtarni, Pahalgam, Naibasti Hardukichroo Aishmuquam Martand, Khanabal

Highway system
- Roads in India; Expressways; National; State; Asian
← NH 301	→ NH 701

National Highway 501, commonly referred to as NH 501 is a national highway in India. It is a spur road of National Highway 1. NH-501 traverses the union territory of Jammu and Kashmir in India.

== Route description ==
Panchtarni - Chandanwari - Pahalgam - Batakut - Naibasti HarduKichroo - Aishmuquam- Martand - Khanabal.

== Major intersections ==
NH 1 Terminal near Panchtarni.
NH 44 Terminal near Khanabal.
NH 501 Terminal near Hutmarah township.

== See also ==
- List of national highways in India
- List of national highways in India by state
