= Arigohal =

Arigohal or Arigol is a village in Anantnag district, Jammu and Kashmir, India, 2 kilometers from the Khanabal to Pahalgam road, connected to Akad Park via a small road. The population of the village is about 1800. The Lidder River is on its west side. The majority of the inhabitants are farmers. The villagers typically remain in near isolation except in winter when they travel to different parts of India to sell Kashmiri shawls to earn their livelihood. Islam is the only religion observed in Arigohal.
