= Mount Amarnath =

Mountain in Jammu and Kashmir, India

Amarnath Peak
- Location within Jammu and Kashmir

Highest point
- Elevation: 5,186 m (17,014 ft)
- Prominence: 681 m (2,234 ft)
- Coordinates: 34°13′30″N 75°29′30″E

Geography
- Location: Kashmir Valley
- Parent range: Himalayas

Climbing
- First ascent: Never been climbed
- Easiest route: Zojila side North face

Mount Amarnath is a mountain with a peak elevation of 5,186 metres (17,014 ft), in the Ganderbal district of the Indian union territory of Jammu and Kashmir, in the vicinity of Sonamarg. Amarnath Peak is part of the Himalayas, and is located south of Zojila and west of Machoi Glacier. It lies 117km northeast from Srinagar, 13km from Baltal in the southeast. It lies 6km south of Zojila. The meltwaters from Mount Amarnath and surrounds form a major tributary of the Sind River at Baltal.

Amarnath is considered a sacred mountain. It has a cave at its south face at an elevation of 3,800 metres (12,470 ft) known as Amarnath cave. The cave is believed to be the ancient and among most sacred places for pilgrimage in Hinduism. It is the centre for Hindu pilgrims during summer.

== Climbing history and routes ==
Due to its religious importance, Mount Amarnath is not climbed. It was first surveyed in 1912 by a British medical team headed by Ernest Neve, who surveyed most of the peaks of this Himalayan range. The Scottish Colonel N. N. L. Watts also went through the tracks of this peak and discovered an easy route to ascend the peak in 1933, which leads from Zojila down to the south and a glacial ascent to the summit of Amarnath Peak.

Apart from the Zojila side, Mount Amarnath can be reached leaving the cave on the left side and climbing through the east face. The route as discovered by Watts is from the north face which is accessible from Srinagar 112 km (70 mi) by road NH 1D, 12 km (7.5 mi) from Sonamarg and 4 km (2.5 mi) climb to the glacier of the peak.
