= 1996 Amarnath Yatra tragedy =

1996 mass death of pilgrims in India

Coordinates: 33.45°N 76.24°E

Amarnath Yatra tragedy (1996) refers to the deaths of over 250 pilgrims in 1996 in Jammu and Kashmir state in India due to poor weather. The pilgrims were on the annual pilgrimage (Yatra) to Amarnath Temple.

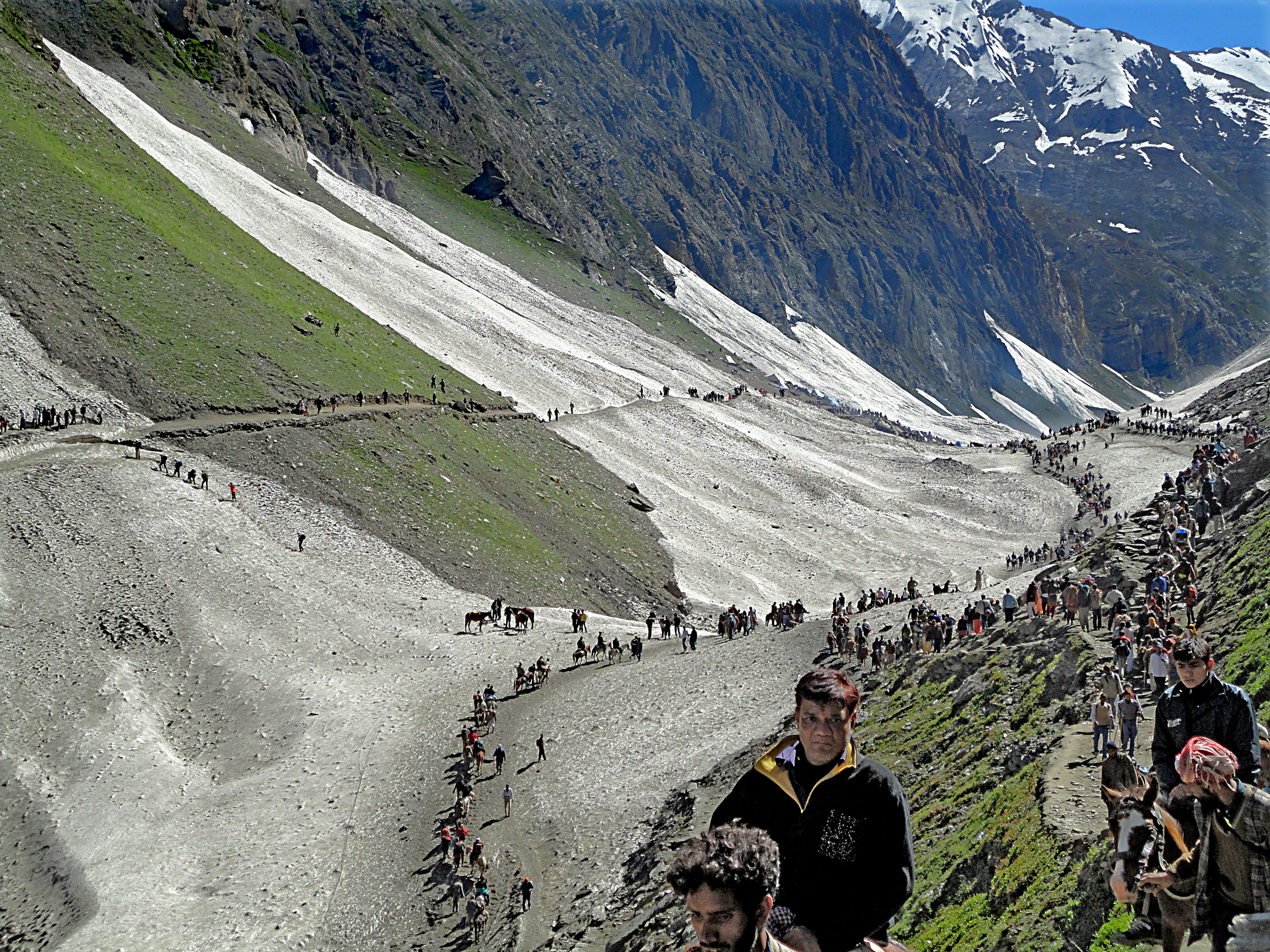
Pilgrims en route to Amarnath in 2011

The number of pilgrims in 1992 reached 50,000. The first attack against the pilgrims happened in 1993, the same year the Pakistan-based Harkat-ul-Ansar had announced a ban due to demolition of the Babri Masjid. The pilgrimage passed off mostly peacefully.

In 1994-5 and 1998, the group again announced a ban on the annual Amarnath yatra. In 1996 the militants had said that they would not interfere.

Due to the lack of activity by Harkat-ul-Ansar, the number of pilgrims in 1996 was higher than usual. Between, 21 and 25 August 1996 about one lakh (100,000) yatris were simultaneously moving either up or down between Jammu and the Amarnath.

During this period, there was unusually heavy snowfall along with severe blizzards along the yatra route. Nearly 242 pilgrims died due to exhaustion, exposure, freezing, and other factors. Over 263 dead bodies were found in and about the surroundings of the temple. The National Conference government constituted a committee headed by the retired Indian Administrative Service officer Nitish Sengupta, which was asked to inquire into various aspects of the tragedy and suggest measures and remedies to avoid recurrence of such incidents in future.
