= 2022 Amarnath floods =

2022 disasters in India

- Date: 8 July 2022
- Location: Amarnath, India
- Type: cloudburst, flooding
- Deaths: 16
- Missing: 40+

On 8 July 2022, flood caused by a cloudburst in Amarnath killed at least 16 people and left at least 40 of others missing.
