= Bakarwali =

Dialect of Gujari language

- Native to: India (Jammu and Kashmir); Pakistan (Azad Kashmir)
- Ethnicity: Bakarwal Gujjars
- Native speakers: 5,941 (1961 census)
- Language family: Indo-European: Indo-Iranian; Indo-Aryan; Central; Gurjar Apabhraṃśa; Rajasthani–Marwari; Rajasthani; Gujari; Bakarwali
- Writing system: Takri, Perso-Arabic script, Devanagari

Language codes
- ISO 639-3: –
- Glottolog: baka1270

Bakawarli also known as Bakerwali or Bakarwal Gujari, is a dialect of the Gujari language. It is spoken by the Bakarwal people of Jammu and Kashmir (union territory) in India and Azad Kashmir in Pakistan. It is slightly different from other Gujari dialects spoken in various parts of Azad Kashmir.

The Glotto code for the Bakawarli is "baka1270". In the 1961 census of India, Bakarwali speakers were recorded separately from Gujari speakers in Jammu and Kashmir (state).

In 2016, Veterinary experts from the Sheep Husbandry Department of Jammu and experienced Bakarwals worked together. They translated scientific research about hot weather effects on animals and people into the Bakarwali dialect. This translation made it easier to get feedback and responses from Bakarwal nomads.

== Classification ==
Bakarwali is classified as a dialect of Gujari spoken by Bakarwals. But in terms of vocabulary it is quite different from Gujari. It share similarities with other Indo-Aryan languages including, Marwadi, Haryanvi, Pashto and Urdu.
