= 2000 Amarnath pilgrimage massacre =

Massacre of pilgrims in Anantnag, Jammu and Kashmir, India

2000 Amarnath Yatra attack
- Part of Kashmir conflict
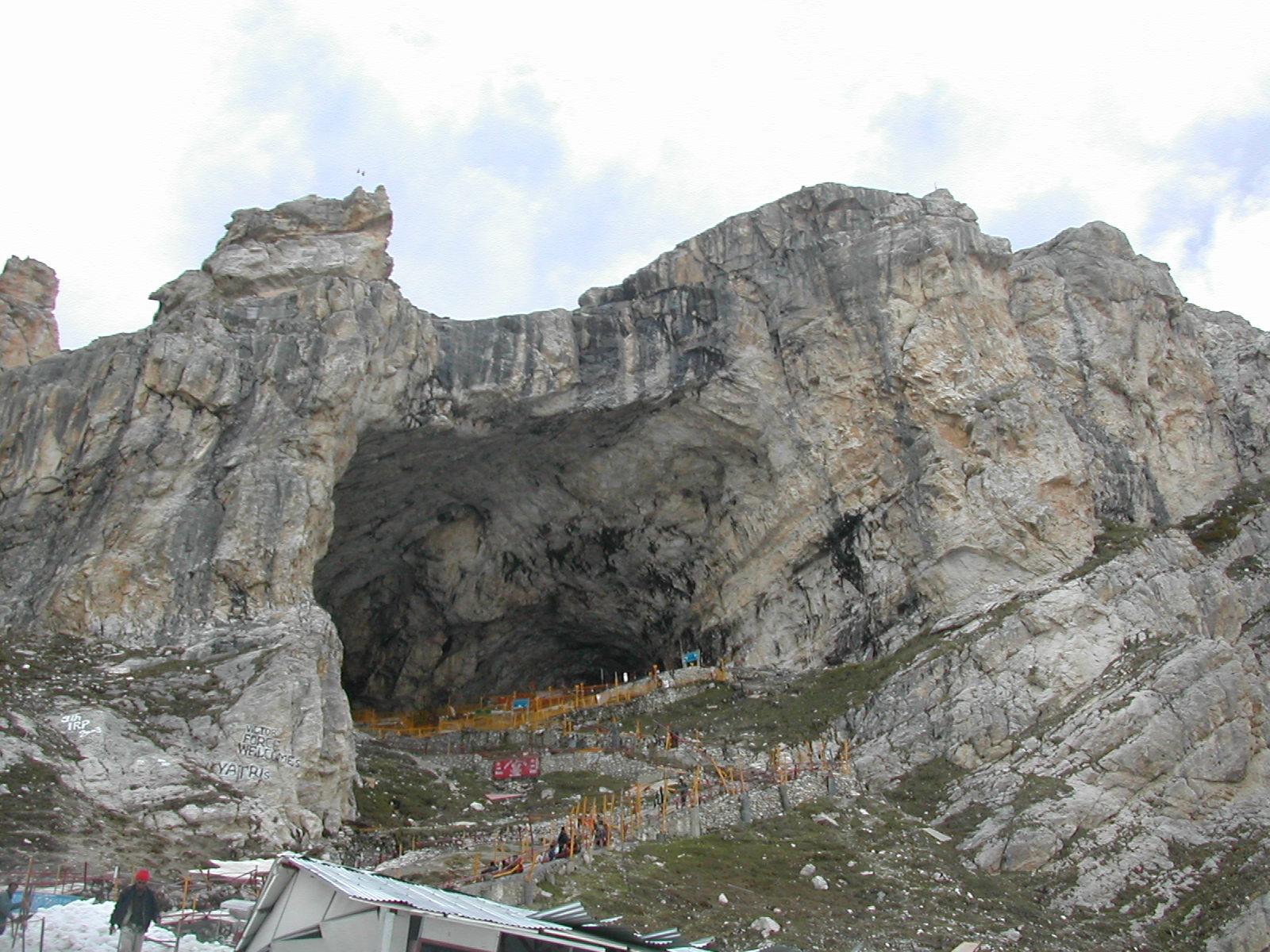
- Pilgrims at Cave shrine of Lord Shiva
- Location: Anantnag district and Doda district, Jammu and Kashmir, India
- Date: 1 – 2 August 2000
- Attack type: Mass shooting
- Deaths: 89 – 105
- Injuries: 62
- Victim: Hindu pilgrims
- Perpetrator: Lashkar-e-Taiba

The 2000 Amarnath pilgrimage attack on 1 and 2 August was the massacre of between 89 and 105 people, with 62 others injured in at least five different coordinated attacks by Kashmiri millitants in Anantnag district and Doda district of Kashmir.

Out of these, 32 were killed on 2 August in 2000 in a massacre at Nunwan base camp in Pahalgam. The dead included 21 Hindu pilgrims, 7 local Muslim shopkeepers and 3 security officers. 7 other people were also injured.

== Details ==
A total of 89 people (official count) to 105 (as reported by PTI) were killed and at least 62 were injured in five separate coordinated terror attacks, including the following partial count on the morning of 3 August 2000.

- On 2 August, at least 32 people were killed, who were mostly unarmed civilians. 21 were Hindu pilgrims, 7 were Muslims shopkeepers and porters, and 3 were security officials. The pilgrims were on their way to Amarnath cave shrine on annual pilgrimage. Many of those killed were Hindus and Shia Muslim porters hiring their horses and services to ferry the pilgrims to the site. Subsequently, then the Prime Minister of India Atal Bihari Vajpayee visited Pahalgam and blamed Lashkar-e-Taiba for the killings.
- At least 27 civilian migrant labourers from the Indian states of Uttar Pradesh, Bihar and Madhya Pradesh, were killed in similar simultaneous terror attacks in Mirbazar-Qazigund and Sandoo-Acchabal in Anantnag district.
- At least 11 unarmed civilian people were killed in a pre-dawn terrorist attack in a remote village in Doda district.
- In a remote village in Kupwara, militants killed seven members of a family belonging to a surrendered Islamist militant
- At least 8 unarmed civilians were killed and 2 more were injured in an ambush by terrorists on a group of Village Defence Committee patrol party members of Kayar village of Doda district.

== Aftermath ==
Prime Minister Atal Bihari Vajpayee blamed Pakistan for being determined to sabotage democracy in (then) Jammu and Kashmir.

== See also ==
- Kanwar Yatra
- 2017 Amarnath Yatra attack
- 2003 Nadimarg massacre
- Amarnath land transfer controversy
- Islamic terrorism
- List of massacres in India
- List of terrorist incidents in India
- List of Islamist terrorist attacks
- List of terrorist incidents in Jammu and Kashmir
