= Khanabal =

Khanabal Khanebal
- Market Town
- Location in Jammu and Kashmir, India Khanabal (India)
- Coordinates: 33°44′30″N 75°07′41″E
- Country: India
- State: Jammu and Kashmir
- District: Anantnag

Languages
  - Official: Kashmiri, Urdu, Hindi, Dogri, English
- Time zone: UTC+5:30 (IST)
- PIN: 192 101
- Telephone code: 01932
- Vehicle registration: JK 03

Khanabal is a small town located in Anantnag District's Anantnag City. The main National Highway of Kashmir passes through it. It is the center for Anantnag City's Railway Station. Khanabal is situated on both banks of the Jehlum River. The part on the western bank is called Dak Banglow Khanabal, and the part on the eastern bank is called Khanabal Bazaar. The oldest college of the district, Govt. Degree College, Anantnag, is situated on the western bank of the Jehlum River near Dak Banglow Khanabal. Besides, Dak Banglow is an army cantonment area and has a housing colony for the district administrative officers of the police. The district police lines and the office of SSP Anantnag is also situated at Khanabal. Besides the college, Khanabal has a Govt. Higher Secondary School and an army goodwill school run by the Indian Army.

The adjacent villages/mohalas of Khanabal are Batapora, Lidder Mattoo, Gurpora, Mirgund, Nandapora, Nathpora, Dagapora, Batengoo and Uranhall.
