= Nachlana =

- Village
- Location in Jammu and Kashmir, India Nachlana (India)
- Coordinates: 33.36°N 75.16°E
- Country: India
- Union territory: Jammu and Kashmir
- District: Ramban

Languages
  - Spoken: Pogali, Urdu
- Time zone: UTC+5:30 (IST)
- PIN: 182146

Nachlana is a village in Ramban district in the Indian union territory of Jammu and Kashmir.
