= Panchtarni =

Panchtarni Panchtarni camp Panchtarni river Panchtarni valley
- River valley and hill camp
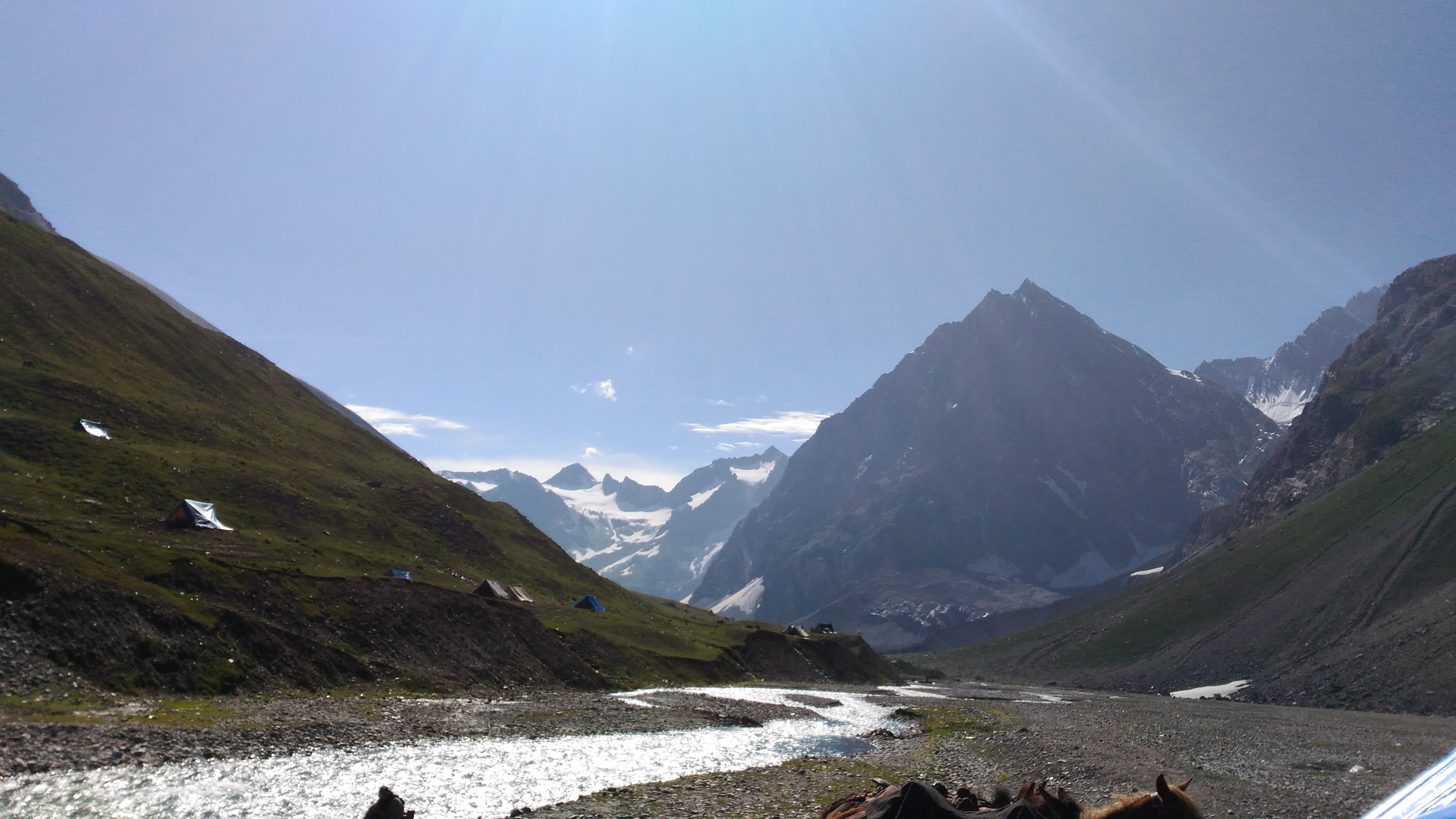
- View of Panchtarni river valley

- Location in Jammu and Kashmir, India Panchtarni (India)
- Coordinates: 34.189285°N 75.4981834°E
- Country: India
- State: Jammu and Kashmir
- Elevation: 3,505 m (11,499 ft)

Languages
  - Official: Kashmiri, Urdu, Hindi, Dogri, English
  - Local: Kashmiri
- Time zone: UTC+5:30 (IST)
- PIN: 192126

Panchtarni is a locality in Anantnag district of the Indian union territory of Jammu and Kashmir. It is a popular pilgrimage and tourist destination on the way to Amarnath Temple near the Amarnath Glacier in Himalayas. It is located 40 kilometres (25 mi) from Pahalgam base camp and 15 kilometres (9.3 mi) ahead of last halt camp of Sheshnag Lake in the north. It is a meadowland on the banks of eponymous Panchtarni River where five glacier-fed tributary streams meet in eponymous Panchtarni Valley surrounded by snow-capped mountains at an altitude of 11,500 feet (3,500 m). It is also the final helicopter drop off for the Amarnath yatra pilgrims, who have to trek the rest of the 6 kilometres (3.7 mi) journey either on foot or by mule from this camp.

== Climate ==
It has subtropical highland climate with the winters being long and cold winter while the summers are short and mild.

=== Amarnath Yatra ===
Panchtarni, a rest camp for the Amarnath yatra, is located between the base camp at Pahalgam and the last rest camp at Sheshnag Lake before the final Amarnath cave shrine. The July-August popular annual Hindu pilgrimage, undertaken by up to 600,000 or more pilgrims to the 130 feet (40 m)-high glacial Amarnath cave shrine of iced stalagmite Shiv linga at 12,756 feet (3,888 m) in the Himalayas, is called Amarnath Yatra. It begins with a 43 kilometres (27 mi) mountainous trek from the Nunwan and Chandanwari base camps at Pahalgam and reaches cave-shine after night halts at Sheshnag Lake and Panchtarni camps.

== See also ==
- Gulmarg
- Gurez
- Keran, Jammu and Kashmir
- Sonamarg
- Sopore
