= 2003 Nadimarg massacre =

Massacre held in 2003 after forced exodus of Kashmiri Pandits in 1990

Nadimarg Massacre
- Location: 33.7446°N 75.0121°E; Nadimarg, Pulwama District, Jammu and Kashmir, India
- Date: 23 March 2003
- Target: Kashmiri Pandits
- Attack type: Mass murder
- Deaths: 24
- Perpetrator: Lashkar-e-Taiba
- Motive: Islamist Terrorism

2003 Nadimarg massacre was the killing of 24 Kashmiri Pandits in the village of Nadimarg in Pulwama District of Jammu and Kashmir by Lashkar-e-Taiba terrorists on 23 March 2003.

== Background ==
In early 1990, faced by the rising Kashmir insurgency and fearing persecution and physical harm, the majority of Kashmiri Hindus, who are called Kashmiri Pandits, fled the Kashmir Valley to makeshift camps across the Jammu division. Small numbers remained within the Valley.

== The attack ==
Armed Islamic terrorist came dressed in counterfeit military uniforms to Nadimarg, near Shopian in the Pulwama district. The attack took place between 11 pm and midnight. Victims included 11 men, 11 women, and two small boys who were lined up and shot and killed by the gunmen. The victims ranged from a 65-year-old man to a 2-year-old boy.

== Perpetrators ==
The perpetrators belonged to the internationally-designated terrorist organization Lashkar-e-Taiba and were led by their 'district commander' Zia Mustafa, who was said to be from Rawalakot in Pakistan-administered Kashmir. Mustafa was arrested in 2003 and held in prison. In October 2021, he was taken by security forces to identify militant hideouts in a forest in Poonch. He is said to have been killed in crossfire between the militants and the Indian security forces. He had spent the previous 18 years in jail, mostly in Srinagar, before he was moved to Jammu's high-security Kot Bhalwal jail in 2018.

Three other Lashkar-e-Taiba militants gunned down by Mumbai police on 29 March 2003 were suspected to have been involved in the massacre.

== Reactions ==
India accused Pakistan of being involved in this massacre and said that it would deal with the country with strength and resolve.

Christina Rocca, then the US Assistant Secretary of State for South Asia, argued for the need for US to remain "actively and effectively engaged", pointing out to this massacre. The US Secretary of State Colin Powell and British foreign minister Jack Straw, condemning the massacre, urged respect for the Line of Control and called on Pakistan to end infiltration across it. Chris Patten, European Commissioner for External Relations and United Nations Secretary-General Kofi Annan also condemned the massacre.

In an editorial in Pakistan's Dawn, Kunwar Idris criticised the massacre and said "Pundits are children of no lesser god that two hundred thousand of them should be driven out of their homes and the remaining few should be left to die a gruesome death."

== In popular culture ==
- 2022: The climax of Hindi movie The Kashmir Files, written and directed by Vivek Agnihotri, depicts a scene based on the massacre. It shows Islamic militants lining up 24 Kashmiri Hindus in Nadimarg and shooting all of them, including a baby.
