= Sheshnag Lake =

Lake in Jammu and Kashmir, India

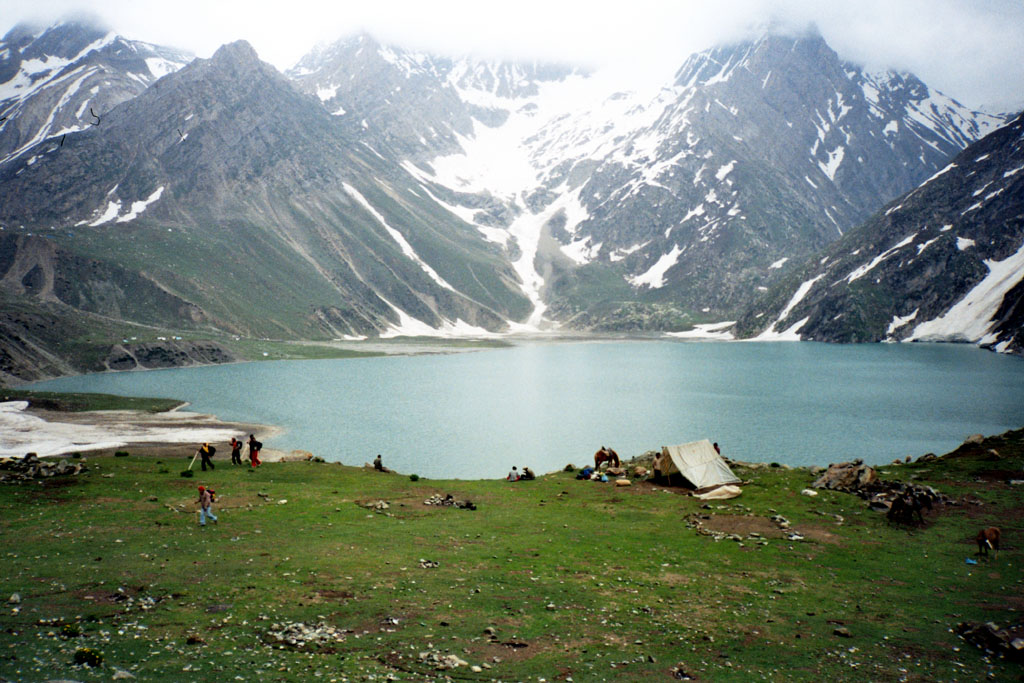

- Location within Jammu and Kashmir
- Location: Amarnath, Anantnag district, Jammu and Kashmir, India
- Coordinates: 34.093697°N 75.496686°E
- Type: Oligotrophic lake
- Primary inflows: Melting of snow
- Primary outflows: A tributary of Lidder River
- Max. length: 1.1 kilometres (0.68 mi)
- Max. width: 0.7 kilometres (0.43 mi)
- Surface elevation: 3,590 metres (11,780 ft)
- Frozen: December to March

Sheshnag Lake (Urdu pronunciation: [ʃeːʃnɑːɡ] ; Kashmiri pronunciation: [ʃiːʃinaːɡ]) is an alpine high elevation oligotrophic lake located in Amarnath in the Anantnag district of Kashmir Valley in Jammu and Kashmir, India at an elevation of 3590 meters. It is situated on the track leading to the Amarnath cave, about 77 km from Anantnag city & 23 km from Pahalgam. It has a maximum length of 1.1 km and maximum width of 0.7 km.

== Etymology, geography ==
In ancient times, cloud bursts at the site caused a deep groove lined by mountains. Those mountains are covered with snow and ice sheets which melt slowly so that water flows into the deep groove and forms a lake. It was named Sheshnag because Sheshanaga (Śeṣanāga) is the nagaraja or King of all Nāgas and one of the primal beings of creation in Hinduism. An hour's drive away from Srinagar city lies a fabled spring from a popular Kashmiri folk tale, “Himal and Nagrai”. A stone marker there commemorates the lore and with it, the original, aboriginals inhabitants of Kashmir, the Nagas. The protagonist of this story was Nagrai, a Naga, the serpent king. Sheshnag Lake is home to many types of fish among which is the brown trout. It freezes during winter, and is inaccessible during this season due to heavy snowfall. It is surrounded by green lush meadows and mountains covered by snow. Sheshnag Lake is one of the famous tourist destinations in Kashmir Valley. It is mostly fed by melting of snow and streams coming down from mountaintops. It drains out through a stream that joins Lidder River at Pahalgam.

== Access ==
Sheshnag Lake is situated 120 kilometers east from Srinagar and 23 km from Pahalgam. It can be accessed 113 km by road up to Chandanwari from which ponies can be hired to cover a trek of 7 km upslope to reach the Sheshnag Lake. Amarnath Temple is situated 20 kilometers north of this lake.

== Gallery ==
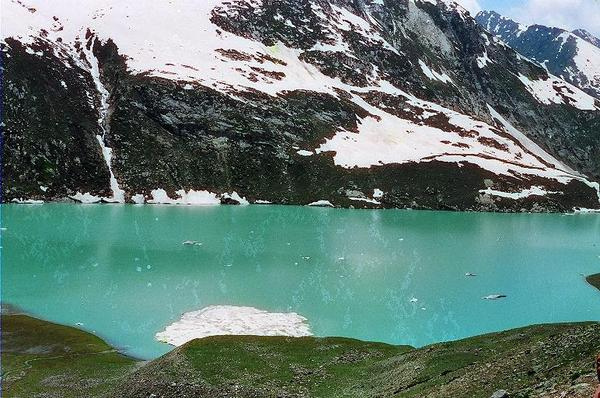

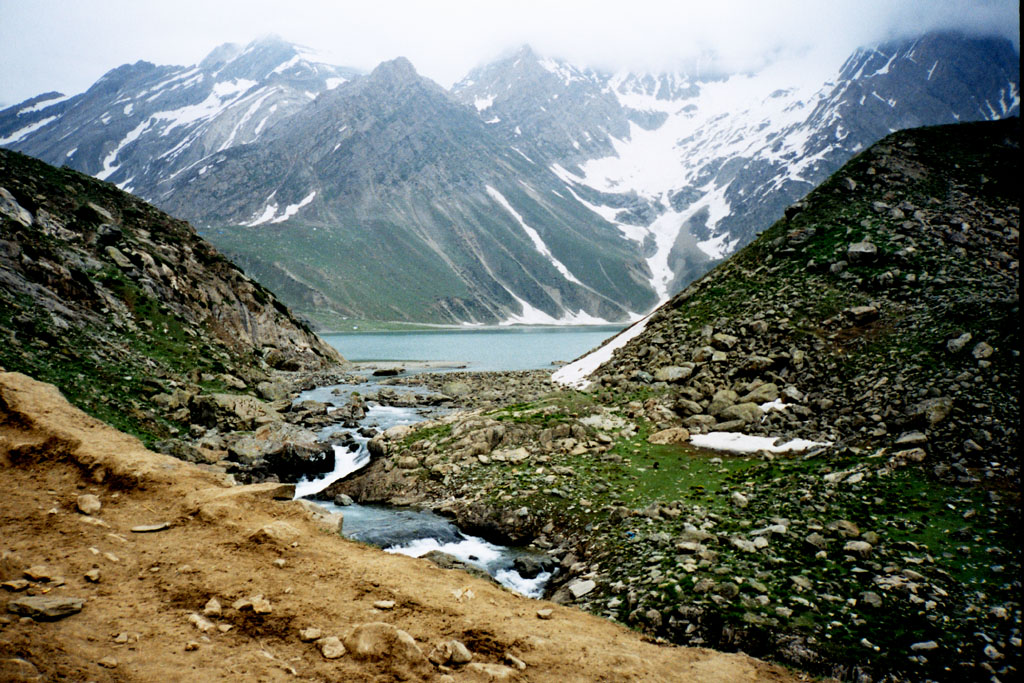

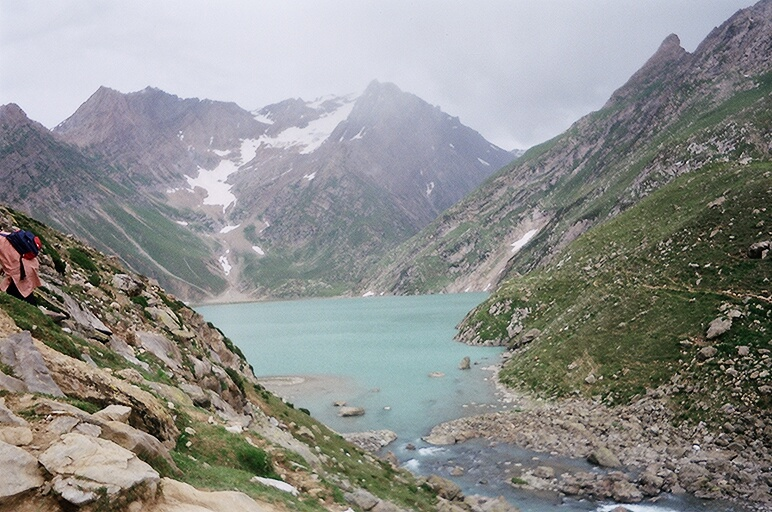
