= Bakarwal people =

Pastoral nomadic Gujjar sub-group found in Himalayan regions of India and Pakistan

بکروال
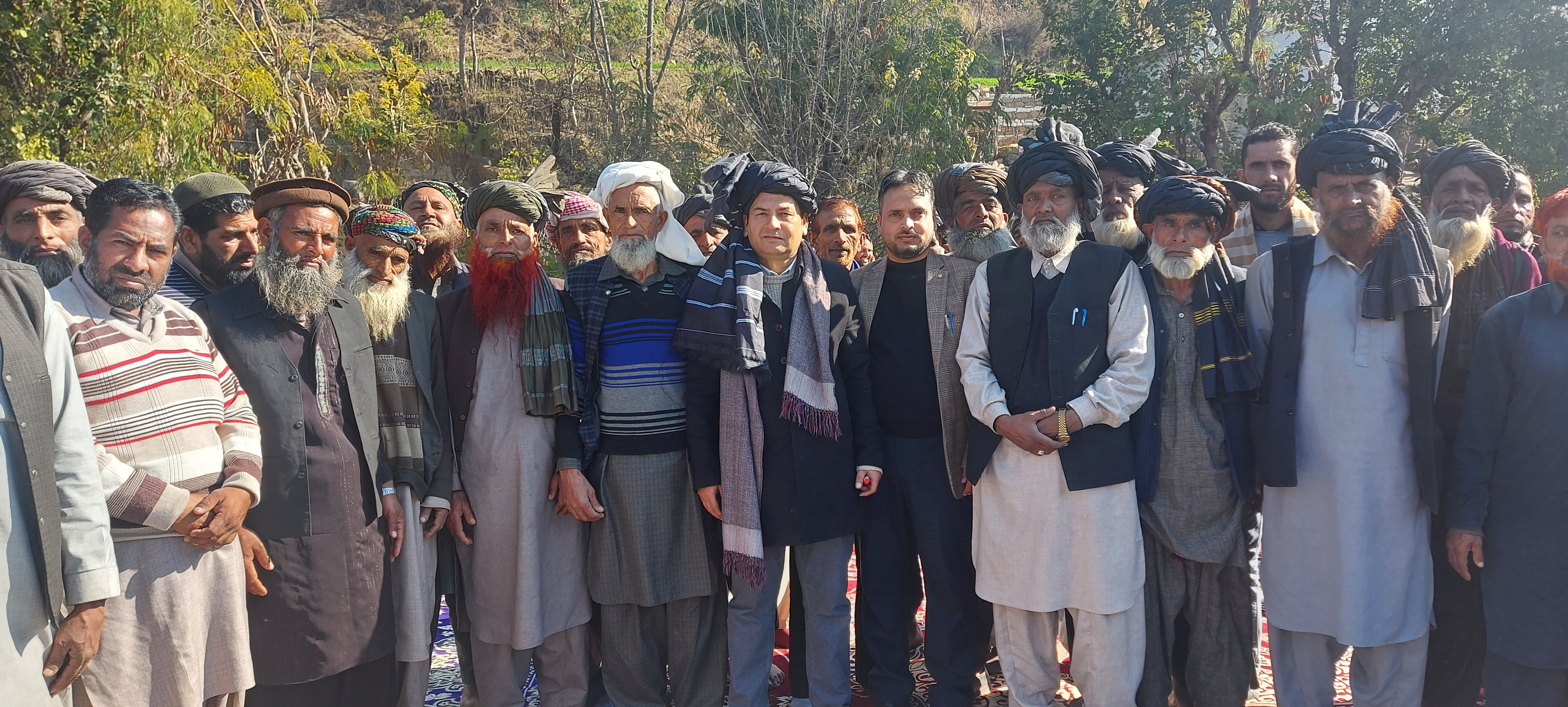
- The Bakarwals of Rajouri

Total population
- 1,13,198 (2011 census)

Regions with significant populations
- Pakistan, Azad Kashmir; India, Jammu and Kashmir

Languages
- Urdu • Gojri (Bakarwali) • Dogri • Pothwari

Religion
- Sunni Islam

Related ethnic groups
- Gaddis • Van Gujjar people • Muslim Gujjars

The Bakarwal (also spelled Bakkarwal, or Bakerwal) are a nomadic Muslim ethnic group and a sub-group of the larger Gujjar community. They primarily inhabit the Indian Union Territories of Jammu and Kashmir and Ladakh, where they have been listed as a Scheduled Tribe since 1991. The Gujjar-Bakarwal are among the largest Muslim tribal communities in the region and constitute the third-largest ethnic group in the Indian-administered part of Jammu and Kashmir.

The Bakarwal are traditionally pastoral nomads, known for seasonally migrating with their livestock in search of suitable grazing pastures. Their annual transhumance involves moving between high-altitude meadows in the summer and lower-altitude areas during the winter. They were officially enumerated as a distinct group for the first time during the 2001 Census of India.

They inhabit a vast area stretching from the Pir Panjal Range to Zanskar, located in the Himalayan mountains of India . Their seasonal migration patterns encompass regions such as Suru Valley and Kargil in Ladakh, and they traverse the Pir Panjal and Banihal passes during their transhumance. This extensive migration route underscores their deep-rooted connection to the diverse terrains and climates of the Himalayan region.

== History and origin ==
Bakarwals and Gujjars are often grouped together as a single social and ethnic community due to their shared ancestry, language, religion, and cultural practices. Both groups speak dialects of Gojri, practice Islam, and follow similar customs in terms of dress, food, and social organization. As a result, they are frequently treated as a unified tribal category in official classifications and government records, particularly in the context of their Scheduled Tribe status in Jammu and Kashmir and Ladakh.

The Bakarwal community is not limited to India; they are also found in Azad Kashmir, Pakistan. Significant populations of Bakarwals reside in some areas of Azad Jammu and Kashmir. These areas serve as important seasonal and permanent settlements for the community, reflecting their traditional patterns of transhumance and pastoralism.

Despite these commonalities, Gujjars and Bakarwals are often distinguished by their traditional modes of livelihood. Bakarwals are primarily a nomadic pastoralist group who migrate seasonally with their herds of sheep and goats in search of grazing pastures in the Himalayan highlands during summer and lower-altitude regions in winter.

One view suggests that the Bakarwals emerged in the twentieth century as a mix of Gujjars, Awans, and others from present-day Hazara, Pakistan. However, this view is not recognized by the Bakarwals themselves, and there is no historical or traditional evidence supporting such an origin.

The Bakarwals and Gujjars in Indian-administered Jammu and Kashmir sometimes practice inter-tribal marriages as well.

== Etymology ==
The term Bakarwal is an occupational one and is derived from the Gojri/Punjabi or Dogri word Bakari or Bakra meaning goat or sheep, and wal meaning "one who takes care of".

== Religion ==
The Bakarwals are completely Muslim and adhere to the Sunni sect of Islam, similar to other Muslim Gujjar communities.

== Subgroups ==
The Bakarwal Gujjars are primarily divided into two major subgroups: Kunhari Bakarwal and Illahiwal Bakarwal. Moreover, Bakarwals, like other Gujjar communities, are also subdivided into numerous sub-clans.

=== Kunhari ===
The Kunhari is a subgroup of Bakarwals who claimed their origin from the Kunar province of Afghanistan.

=== Illahiwal ===
The Illahiwal are those who claimed their origin from the Illahiwal region in the Kohistan and Swat districts of Khyber Pakhtunkhwa, Pakistan.

== Demographics ==
The Bakarwal nomads are traditionally found throughout the Himalayan regions of India and Pakistan, including parts of Jammu & Kashmir and Azad Kashmir.

=== Jammu and Kashmir ===
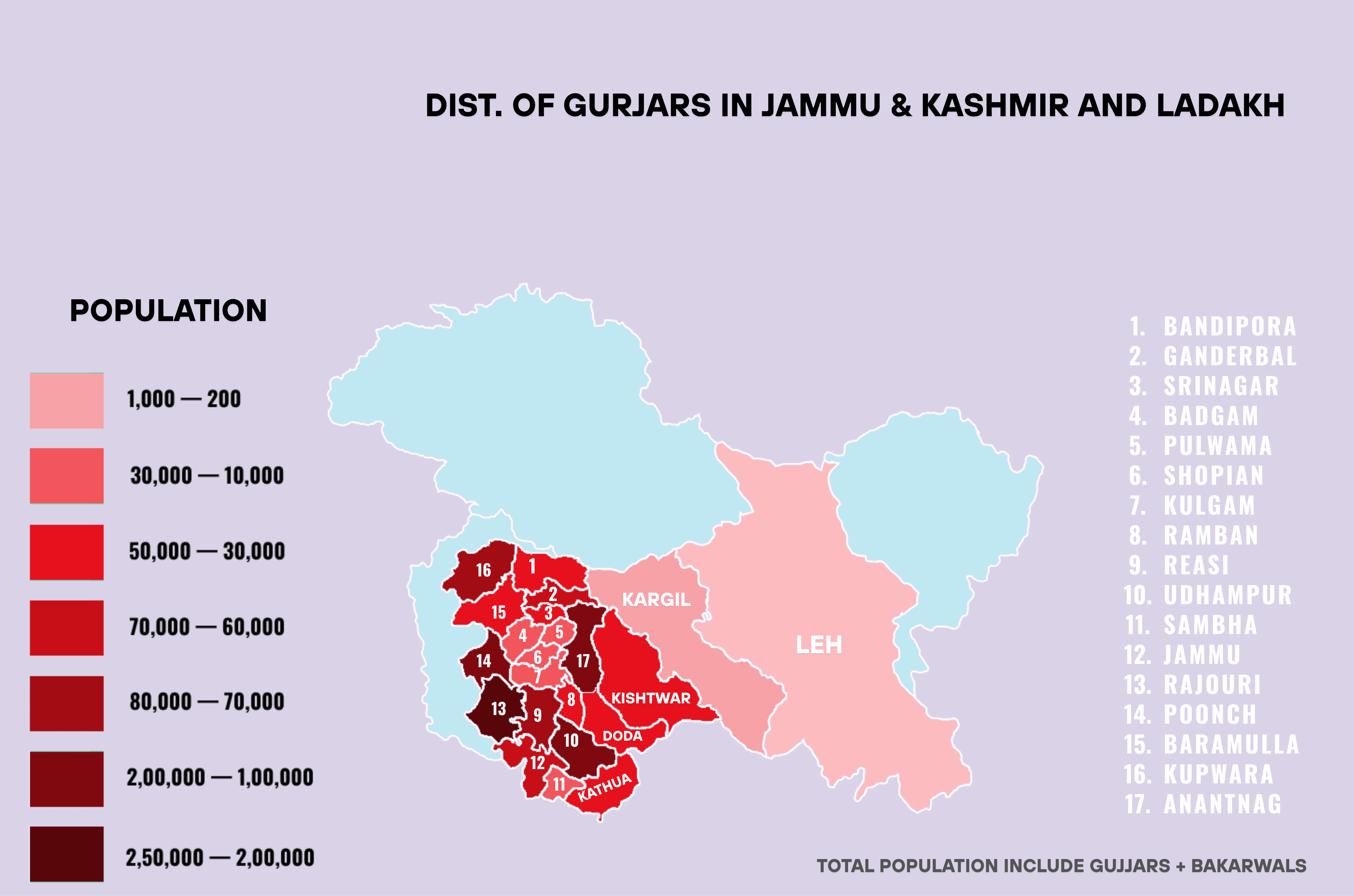
Bakarwal and Gujjar people

The Bakarwal, often counted alongside the Gujjars, constitute a significant portion of the tribal population. The Gujjar and Bakarwal are estimated to be around 20% of Jammu and Kashmir.

=== Ladakh ===
The Muslim Gujjars and Bakarwal communities in Ladakh are traditionally pastoralists, grazing livestock in areas like Rangdum. Recently, disputes over land encroachment and unauthorized construction have arisen. In 2024, the Lieutenant Governor of Ladakh intervened to address these issues, including the illegal occupation of grazing land and the ongoing legal dispute over land rights in the region.

=== Himachal Pradesh ===
The Bakarwal nomads are also found in the Himalayan state of Himachal Pradesh, which borders Jammu and Kashmir and Tibet.

=== Pakistan ===
In Pakistan, the Bakarwal are primarily found in some areas of Azad Jammu and Kashmir, where they continue their nomadic traditions across mountainous and highland regions.

==== Azad Kashmir ====
In Azad Jammu and Kashmir, the Bakarwal are a nomadic pastoralist community traditionally engaged in the seasonal herding of goats and sheep. They migrate annually across the Pir Panjal and Himalayan mountain ranges in search of grazing pastures, often traveling long distances by foot. Their routes typically span from lowland areas such as Kharian to high-altitude plateaus like Deosai in Gilgit-Baltistan, passing through regions including Muzaffarabad, Garhi Dupatta, and the Neelum Valley.

== Population ==
Historical population
Year	Pop.	±% p.a.
2001	60,724	—
2011	113,198	+6.43%
source: 2001 census - 2011 census

The Bakarwal population in Jammu and Kashmir was 60,724 according to the 2001 Indian census.

The 2011 Indian census showed a 6.43% increase in the Bakarwal population, reaching 113,198 in the Jammu and Kashmir region.

== Economy ==
As sheep and goat rearing transhumants, the Bakarwals alternate with the seasons between high and low altitudes in the hills of the Himalayas. From here, it is clear to see that the Bakarwals mainly follow a migration route through the foothills of the Himalayas as they can be found on the Upper Himalayan Range all the way down into the Lower Himalayan Range.

== Social status ==
As of 1991, the Bakarwal were classified as a Scheduled Tribe under the Indian government's general reservation program of positive discrimination.

== Gallery ==
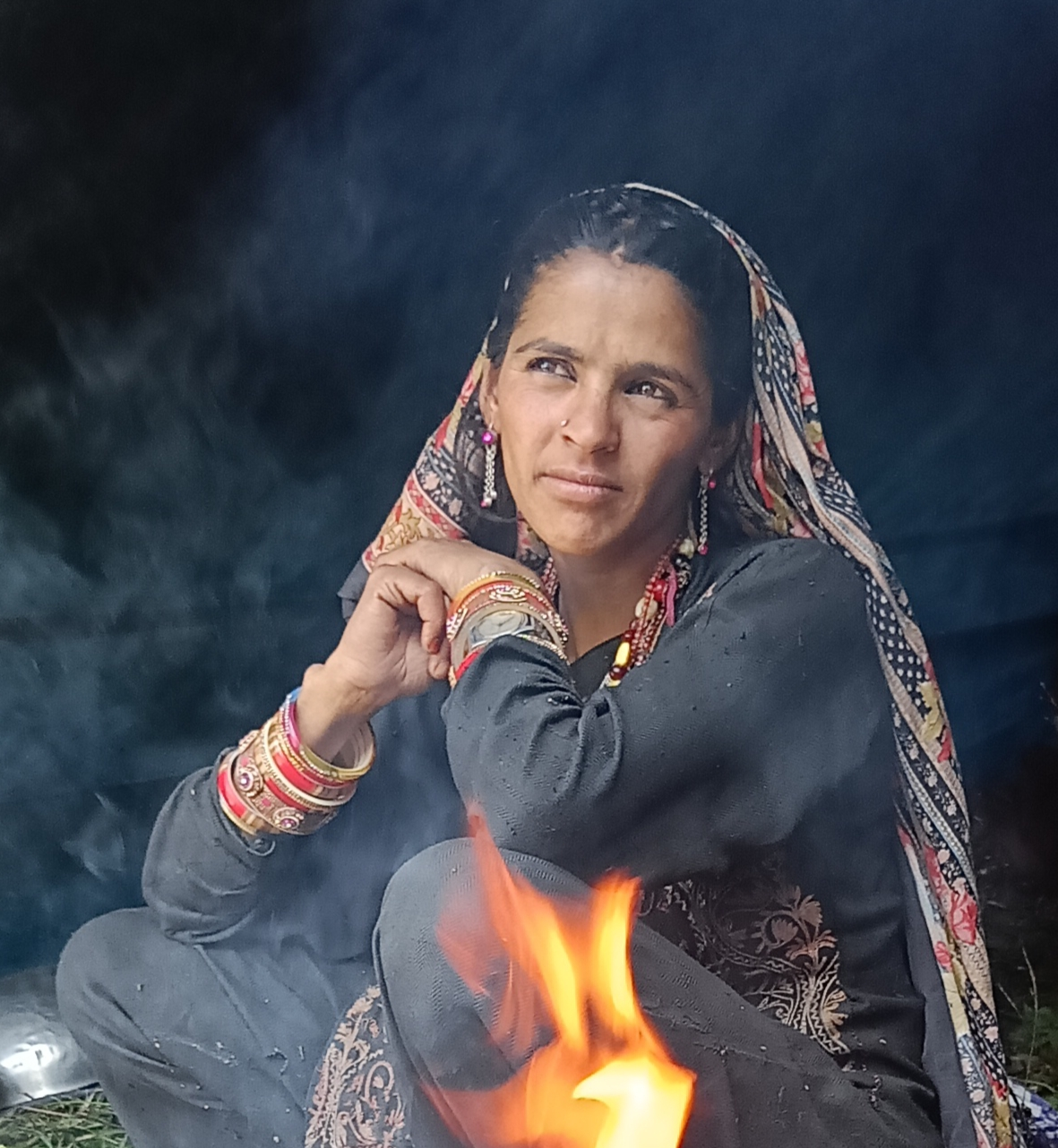
Bakarwal women from Chenab Valley of Jammu and Kashmir

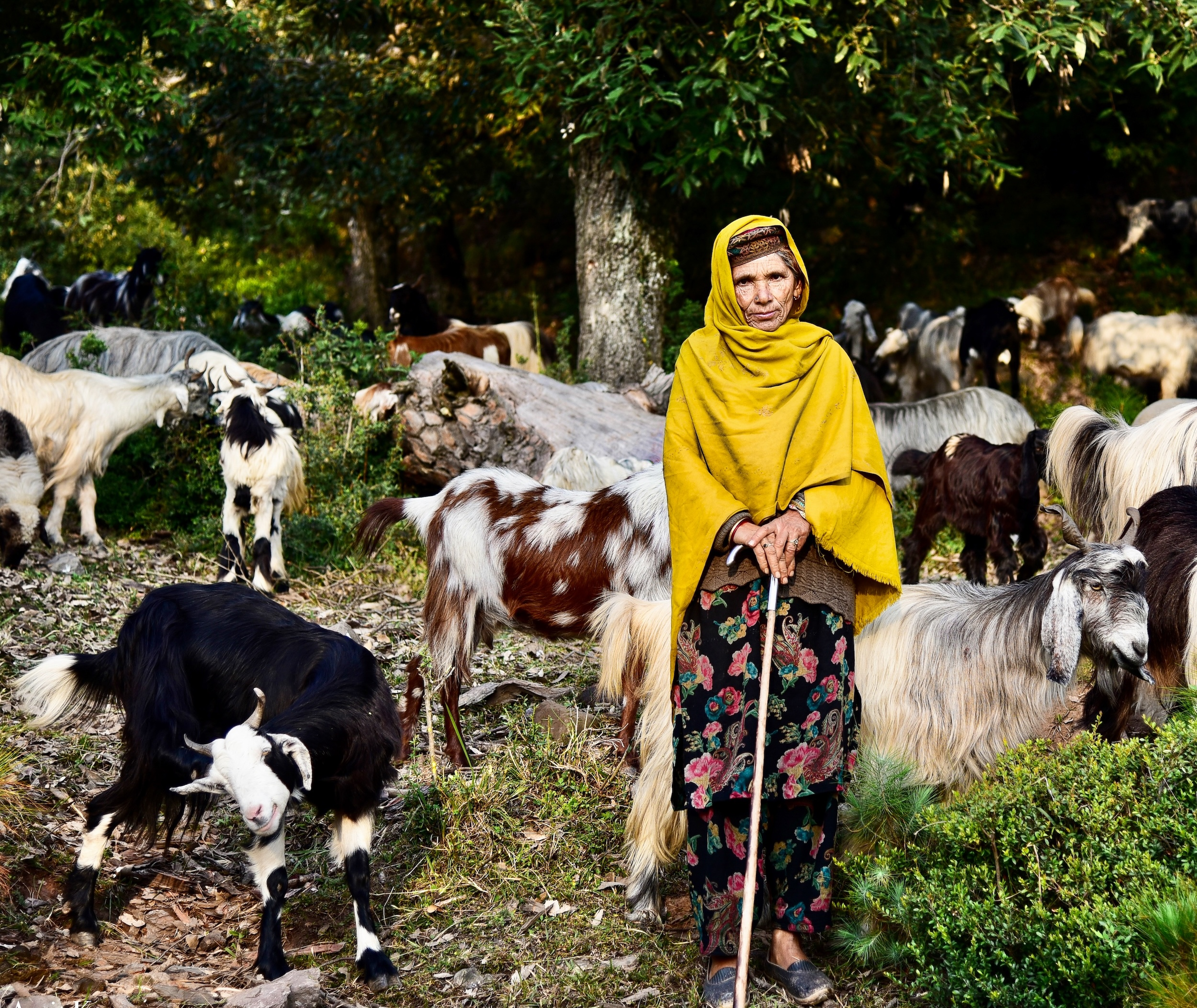
Bakarwal shepherd woman from Jammu and Kashmir

Sketch of Bakarwal man holding his son and smoking Hookah

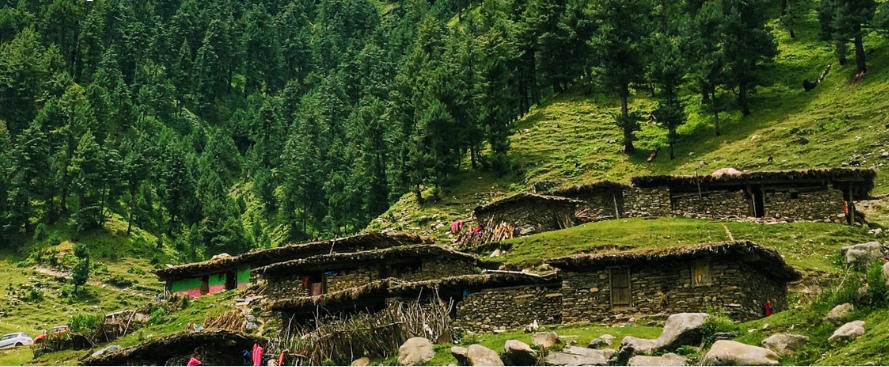
Many Bakarwals live in such houses for periods of time

== See also ==
- Gujari language
- Gaddis
