= Insurgency in Jammu and Kashmir =

Ongoing separatist militancy in Indian-administered Jammu and Kashmir

- Part of the Kashmir conflict and India–Pakistan wars and conflicts
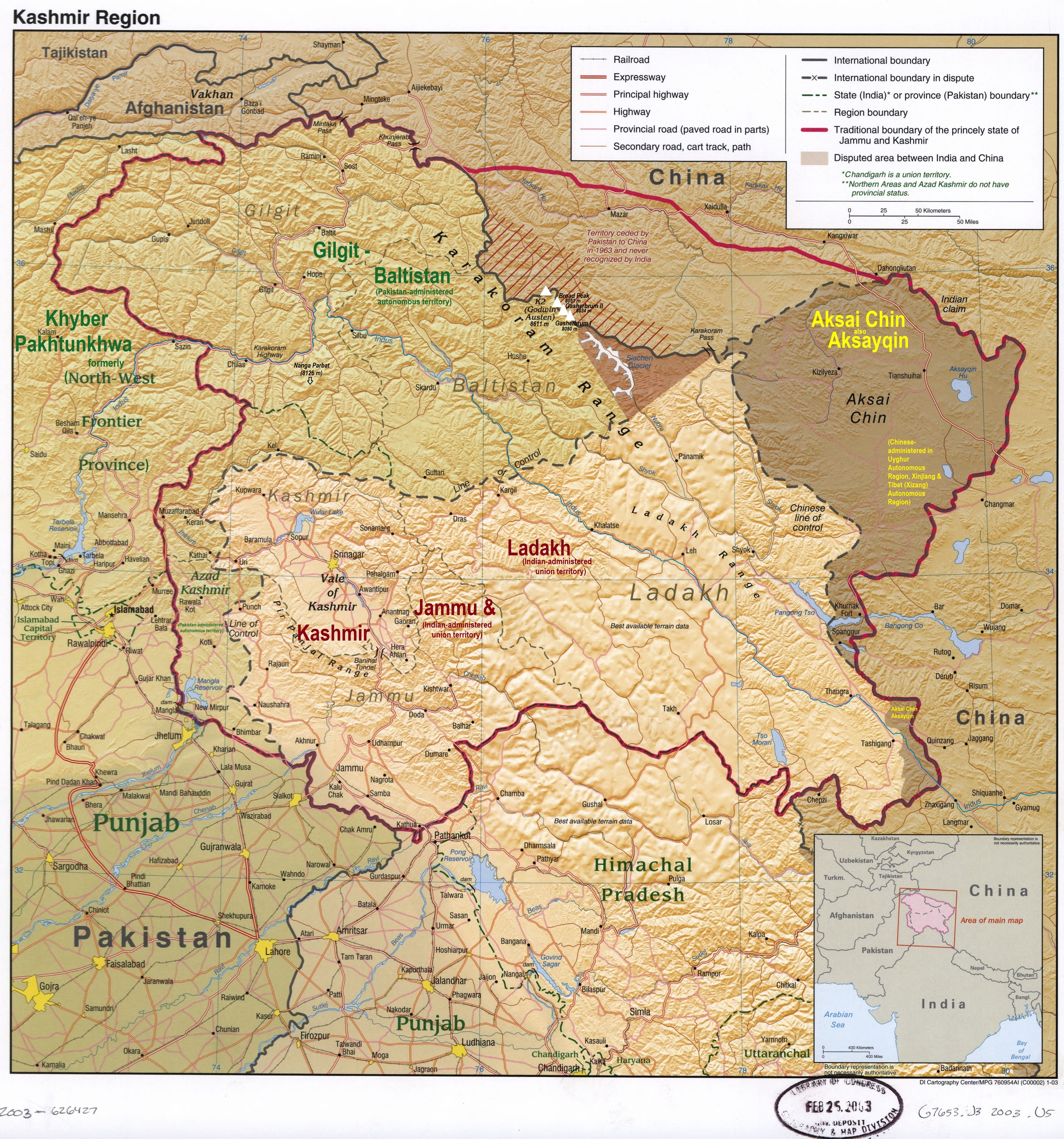
- CIA map of the Kashmir region
Date	13 July 1989 – present (37 years, 4 months and 1 week)
Location	Jammu and Kashmir
Status	Ongoing

Belligerents
India; Indian Armed Forces; Indian Army; Indian Navy; Central Armed Police Force; Jammu and Kashmir Police	Political parties: APHC; JIJK; Armed groups: Lashkar-e-Taiba; TRF; JeM; MJC; HuJI; Hizbul Mujahideen; PAFF; Other separatist movements & insurgent militant groups; Former armed groups: JKLF (active until 1992); HUM (active until 2019); Al-Umar-Mujahideen (active until 2006); DeM (active until 2018); Al-Badr (active until 2022); Al-Qaeda; AQIS; AGH; Islamic State; (Islamic State) IS Hind; (Islamic State) IS Khorasan (alleged); IS Jammu & Kashmir (until 2019)

Commanders and leaders
Political: (India) Droupadi Murmu, President; (India) Narendra Modi, Prime Minister; (India) Rajnath Singh, Defence Minister; (India) Amit Shah, Home Minister; Military: N. S. Raja Subramani, CDS; Dhiraj Seth, COAS; Dinesh Kumar Tripathi, CNS	Syed Ali Shah Geelani #; Masarat Alam Bhat; Amanullah Khan #; Yasin Malik (POW); Hafiz Saeed; Muhammad Abbas Sheikh †; Sheikh Sajjad Gul; Maulana Masood Azhar; Abdul Rauf Azhar X; Ilyas Kashmiri X; Zakir Rashid Bhat †; Syed Salahuddin; Burhan Wani †; Asiya Andrabi (POW); Fazlur Rehman Khalil; Dawood Ahmed Sofi †

Strength
~ 343,000 (Nov 2019, including paramilitary forces and soldiers posted at international border); Indian Army: 168,000; Indian Navy : Classified; CAPFs: 160,000; Jammu and Kashmir Police: unknown	131 militants (2025); 220 militants (2015)

Casualties and losses
2000–2026: 3,636 security forces killed	2000–2026: 13,450 militants killed 857 surrendered 6,097 arrested
- 20,000+ civilian deaths

The insurgency in Jammu and Kashmir, also known as the Kashmir insurgency, is an ongoing Islamist separatist militant insurgency against the Indian administration in Jammu and Kashmir, a territory constituting the southwestern portion of the larger geographical region of Kashmir, which has been the subject of a territorial dispute between India and Pakistan since 1947.

Jammu and Kashmir, long a breeding ground of separatist ambitions, has experienced the insurgency since 1989. S. Paul Kapur has argued that "[p]opular discontent in Kashmir resulted largely from chronic mismanagement and malfeasance on the part of the Indian central government... [and] was not a Pakistani creation. The Pakistanis actively capitalized on Kashmiri discontent, however, and played a crucial role in transforming spontaneous, decentralized opposition to Indian rule into a full-fledged insurgency." Some insurgent groups in Kashmir support complete independence, whereas others seek the region's accession to Pakistan.

More explicitly, the roots of the insurgency are tied to a dispute over local autonomy. Democratic development was limited in Kashmir until the late 1970s, and by 1988, many of the democratic reforms provided by the Indian government had been reversed and non-violent channels for expressing discontent were limited, which caused a dramatic increase in support for insurgents advocating violent secession from India. In 1987, a disputed election held in the erstwhile state of Jammu and Kashmir created a catalyst for the insurgency when it resulted in some of the state's legislative assembly members forming armed insurgent groups. In July 1988, a series of demonstrations, strikes, and attacks on the Indian government effectively marked the beginning of the insurgency in Jammu and Kashmir, which escalated into the most severe security issue in India during the 1990s.

Pakistan, with whom India has fought three major wars over the Muslim-majority region, has officially claimed to be giving only its "moral and diplomatic" support to the separatist movement. The Pakistani Inter-Services Intelligence has been accused by both India and the international community of supporting and supplying arms as well as providing training to "mujahideen" militants in Jammu and Kashmir. In 2015, a former President of Pakistan, Pervez Musharraf, admitted that the Pakistani state had supported and trained insurgent groups in Kashmir throughout the 1990s. Several new militant groups with radical Islamist views emerged during this time and changed the ideological emphasis of the movement from that of plain separatism to Islamic fundamentalism. This occurred partly due to the influence of a large number of Muslim jihadist militants who began to enter the Indian-administered Kashmir Valley through Pakistani-controlled territory across the Line of Control following the end of the Soviet–Afghan War in the 1980s. India has repeatedly called on Pakistan to end its alleged "cross-border terrorism" in the region.

The conflict between militants and Indian security forces in Kashmir has led to a large number of casualties; many civilians have also died as a result of being targeted by various armed militant groups. According to government data, around 41,000 people—consisting of 14,000 civilians, 5,000 security personnel and 22,000 militants—have died because of the insurgency as of March 2017, with most deaths happening in the 1990s and early 2000s. Non-governmental organisations have claimed a higher death toll. The insurgency has also forced the large-scale migration of non-Muslim minority Kashmiri Hindus out of the Kashmir Valley. Since the revocation of the special status of Jammu and Kashmir in August 2019, the Indian military has intensified its counter-insurgency operations in the region.

== History ==
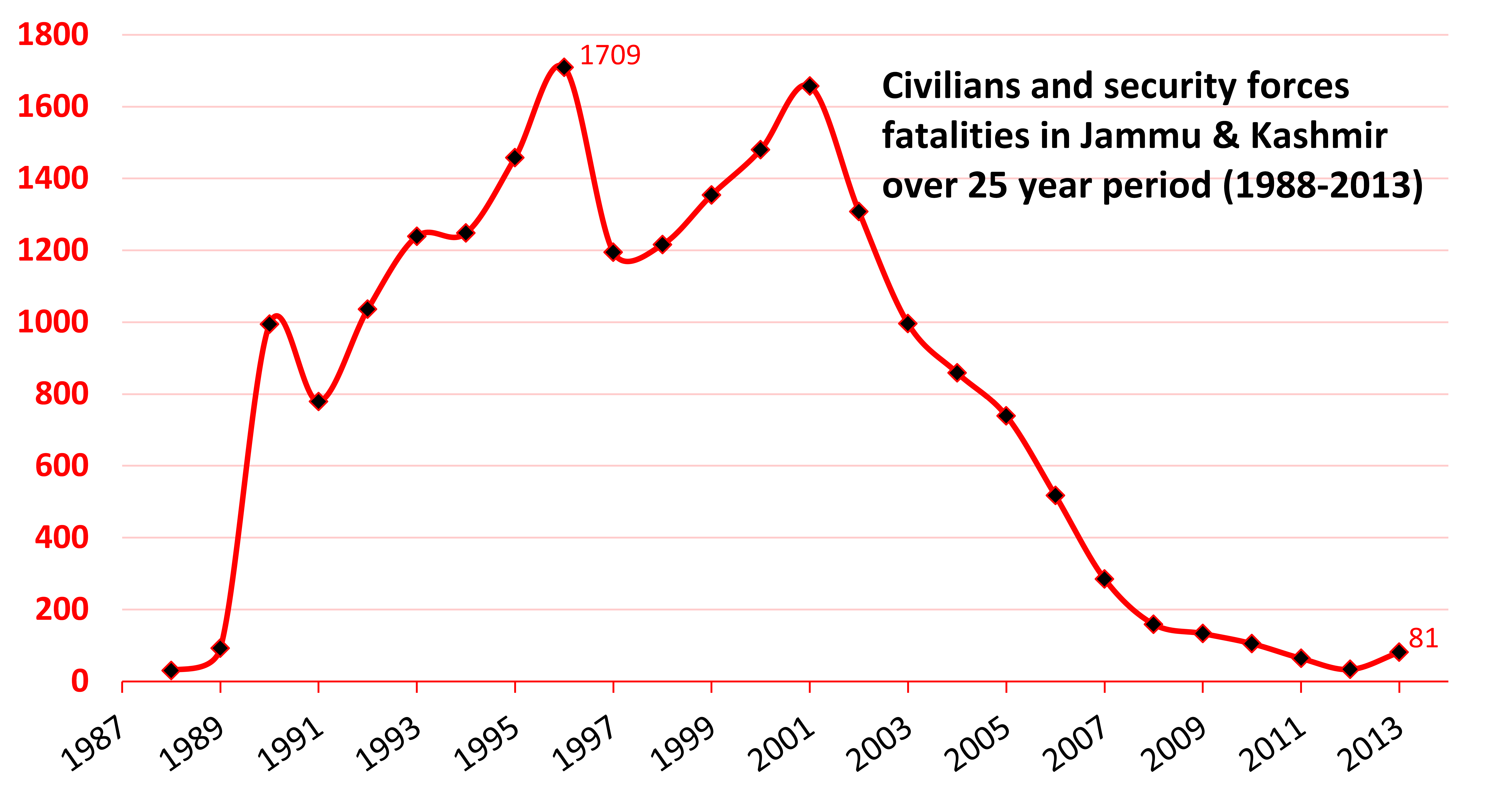
The trend in total yearly civilian and security forces fatalities from insurgency-related violence over 25 years from 1988 to 2013.

=== 1947–1979 ===
After independence from colonial rule India and Pakistan were engaged in a war over the princely state of Jammu and Kashmir. At the end of the war India controlled the southern portion of the princely state. While there were sporadic periods of violence there was no organised insurgency movement.

During this period legislative elections in the state of Jammu and Kashmir were first held in 1951 and Sheikh Abdullah's secular party stood unopposed. He was an instrumental member in the accession of the state to India.

However, Sheikh Abdullah would fall in and out of favour with the central government and would often be dismissed only to be re-appointed later on. This was a time of political instability and power struggle in Jammu and Kashmir, and it went through several periods of president's rule by the Federal Government.

=== 1980s ===
After Sheikh Abdullah's death, his son Farooq Abdullah took over as Chief Minister of Jammu and Kashmir. Farooq Abdullah eventually fell out of favour with the Central Government and the Prime Minister Indira Gandhi, who had his government toppled with the help of his brother-in-law G. M. Shah. GM Shah was the chief minister during the 1986 Anantnag Riots until he was removed and replaced by Farooq Abdullah. A year later, Abdullah reached an accord with the new Prime Minister Rajiv Gandhi and announced an alliance with the Indian National Congress for the elections of 1987. The elections were allegedly rigged in favour of Abdullah.

Most commentators state that this led to the rise of an armed insurgency movement composed, in part, of those who unfairly lost the elections. Pakistan supplied these groups with logistical support, arms, recruits and training.

The daughter of then interior affairs minister, Mufti Mohammad Sayeed, was kidnapped in December 1989, and four militants were released in exchange for her release. This event led to mass celebrations all over the Valley. Farooq Abdullah resigned in January after the appointment of Jagmohan Malhotra as the Governor of Jammu and Kashmir. Subsequently, J&K was placed under Governor's Rule under Article 92 of state constitution.

=== 1990s ===
Following the resignation of Farooq Abdullah's government on January 19, 1990, law and order deteriorated rapidly in the Kashmir Valley, when widespread demonstrations calling for independence broke out across Kashmir, The Central Reserve Police Force(CRPF) opened fire on protesters between January 21 and 23. According to political scientist Sumantra Bose, around 300 protestors were killed in Srinagar alone, including those killed in the Gawkadal massacre.

With JKLF at the forefront, large numbers of militant groups like Allah Tigers, People's League and Hizb-i-Islamia sprung up. Weapons were smuggled on a large scale from Pakistan. In Kashmir JKLF operated under the leadership of Ashfaq Majid Wani, Yasin Bhat, Hamid Shiekh and Javed Mir. To counter this growing pro-Pakistani sentiment in Kashmir, Indian media associated it exclusively with Pakistan.

Assassinations of prominent figures considered moderate by militant groups, such as Mirwaiz Maulvi Farooq, JKLF activist Abdul Ahad Guru, and Qazi Nissar, were meant to warn those with dissenting ideas. However, following the assassination of Nissar, rallies were held condemning both the killing and Pakistan.

JKLF used distinctly Islamic themes to mobilise crowds and justify their use of violence. They sought to establish an Islamic democratic state where the rights of minorities would be protected according to Quran and Sunna and the economy would be organised on the principles of Islamic socialism.

Cinema houses were banned by some militant groups. Many militant organisations like Al baqr, People's league, Wahdat-e-Islam and Allah Tigers imposed restrictions like banning cigarettes, restrictions on Kashmiri girls.

In the early 1990s, thousands of Kashmiris who lived near the Line of Control, including Baramulla, Kupwara, and Handwara, sought refuge in Pakistan-Administered Azad Kashmir for safety. They fled abuses committed by Indian security forces, who targeted border villages, under accusations that they were spies and guides for militants due to their knowledge of the local terrain. The refugees, who lived in tents, lacked identification documents and suffered from unemployment and poverty. Many joined militant organisations, believing it was the only way they could return to their homes.

In 1995, the mausoleum of Nund Rishi, a sacred shrine for Kashmiri Muslims, was burned down along with hundreds of homes and shops in the town of Charar-e-Sharief during a gun battle involving the Indian Army and Hizbul Mujahideen.

=== 2000–2004 ===
The Indian army has conducted various operations to control and eliminate insurgency in the region such as Operation Sarp Vinash, in which a multi-battalion offensive was launched against militants from groups like Lashkar-e-Taiba, Harkat-ul-Jihad-e-Islami, al-Badr and Jaish-e-Mohammed who had been constructing shelters in the Pir Panjal region of Jammu and Kashmir over several years. The subsequent operations led to the death of over 60 militants and uncovered the largest network of militant hideouts in the history of insurgency in Jammu and Kashmir covering almost 100 square kilometers.

=== 2004–11 ===
Beginning in 2004 Pakistan began to end its support for insurgents in Kashmir. This happened because militant groups linked to Kashmir twice tried to assassinate Pakistani President General Pervez Musharraf. His successor, Asif Ali Zardari has continued the policy, calling insurgents in Kashmir "terrorists", although it is unclear if Pakistan's intelligence agency, the Inter-Services Intelligence, thought to be the agency aiding and controlling the insurgency is following Pakistan's commitment to end support for the insurgency in Kashmir. Despite the change in the nature of the insurgency from a phenomenon supported by external forces to a primarily domestic-driven movement the Indian government has continued to send large numbers of troops to the Indian border. There have been widespread protests against the Indian army presence in Kashmir.

Once the most formidable face of Kashmir militancy, Hizbul Mujahideen is slowly fading away as its remaining commanders and cadres are being taken out on a regular interval by security forces. Some minor incidents of grenade throwing and sniper firing at security forces notwithstanding, the situation is under control and more or less peaceful. A record number of tourists including Amarnath pilgrims visited Kashmir during 2012. On 3 August 2012, a top Lashkar-e-Taiba militant commander, Abu Hanzulah involved in various attacks on civilians and security forces was killed in an encounter with security forces in a village in Kupwara district of north Kashmir.

=== 2012–present ===
According to Indian Army data quoted by Reuters, at least 70 young Kashmiris joined the insurgency in 2014, army records showed, with most joining the terrorist organization Lashkar-e-Taiba, which was responsible for carrying out the 2008 Mumbai attacks. Two of the new recruits have doctorates and eight were post graduates, the army data showed. According to BBC, despite a Pakistani ban on militant activity in Kashmir in 2006, its militants continue to attempt infiltration into Indian-administered Kashmir. These attempts were curtailed however when people living along the Line of Control which divides Indian and Pakistani Kashmir started to hold public protests against the activities of the insurgent groups.

Following the killing of militant commander Burhan Wani in July 2016, large scale protests erupted across the Kashmir Valley. The widespread use of pellet guns by security forces resulted in the permanent blinding of hundreds of Kashmiris. Injured individuals were denied medical aid, while authorities imposed censorship and raided newspaper offices. The unrest resulted in the deaths of over 100 civilians, largely young protestors, and left 15,000 injured. Since then, militants belonging to the Jaish-e-Mohammed group carried out the 2016 Uri attack and the 2018 Sunjuwan attack. In February 2019, the Pulwama attack occurred, in which 40 CRPF personnel were killed by a Jaish-e-Mohammed suicide bomber.

In August 2019, the special status of Jammu and Kashmir was revoked, following which the Indian Army intensified its counter-insurgency operations. In June 2020, Doda district was declared militancy free while Tral was declared free from Hizbul Mujahideen militants. In July, a Kashmir police tweet from an official twitter handle said "no resident of #Srinagar district in terrorist ranks now". On 27 June 2021, a day after the successful completion of discussions between the Indian Prime Minister and Jammu and Kashmir political leaders, a drone based attack was reported at the technical area of Jammu Airport which is under the control of the IAF. In the first three months of 2022, there was a 100% increase in the number of Indian soldiers killed by Kashmiri militants compared to the same period in 2021.

=== 2025 ===
On 22 April, 2025 Pahalgam attack, also an Indian navy officer, an Intelligence Bureau officer and an IAF officer were killed in the attack.

On 23 April, an Indian soldier was killed and two other soldiers were wounded in clashes with insurgents.

=== 2025 India–Pakistan diplomatic crisis ===
Raging as an Indian BSF soldier was captured by Pakistani Ranger units.

=== 2026 ===
On 11 November, militants opened fire on a CRPF checkpoint near Mir Bazar in Kulgam district. Three CRPF soldiers were wounded and one was reported to be critically injured. An operation was started to locate the attackers.

== Causes of the insurgency ==
=== Rigging of 1987 Assembly elections ===
Following the rise of Islamisation in the Kashmir valley, during the 1987 state elections, various Islamic anti-establishment groups including Jamaat-e-Islami Kashmir were organised under a single banner named Muslim United Front (MUF), that is largely current Hurriyat. MUF's election manifesto stressed the need for a solution to all outstanding issues according to Simla Agreement, work for Islamic unity and against political interference from the centre. Their slogan was wanting the law of the Quran in the Assembly. But the MUF won only four seats, even though it had polled 31% votes in the election. However, the elections were widely believed to be rigged, changing the course of politics in the state. The insurgency was sparked by the apparent rigging of state elections in 1987.

=== Human rights abuses ===
Indian troops entered the valley to quell the insurgency after it began. Some analysts have suggested that the number of Indian troops in Jammu and Kashmir is close to 600,000 although estimates vary and the government refuses to release official figures. The troops have been accused and held accountable for several humanitarian abuses and have engaged in mass extrajudicial killings, torture, rape and sexual abuse.

Indian security forces have been implicated in many reports for enforced disappearances of thousands of Kashmiris whereas the security forces deny having their information and/or custody. This is often in association with torture or extrajudicial killing. Human right activists estimate the number of disappeared to be over eight thousand, last seen in government detention. The disappeared are believed to be dumped in thousands of mass graves across Kashmir. A State Human Rights Commission inquiry in 2011, has confirmed there are thousands of bullet-ridden bodies buried in unmarked graves in Jammu and Kashmir. Of the 2730 bodies uncovered in 4 of the 14 districts, 574 bodies were identified as missing locals in contrast to the Indian governments insistence that all the graves belong to foreign militants.

Military forces in Jammu and Kashmir operate under impunity and emergency powers granted to them by the central government. These powers allow the military to curtail civil liberties, creating further support for the insurgency.

The insurgents have also abused human rights, driving away Kashmiri Pandits from the Kashmir Valley, an action that has been called ethnic cleansing The government's inability to protect the people from both its own troops and the insurgency has further eroded support for the government.

Amnesty International accused security forces of exploiting the Armed Forces Special Powers Act (AFSPA) that enables them to "hold prisoners without trial". The group argues that the law, which allows security to detain individuals for as many as two years "without presenting charges, violating prisoners' human rights". The Army sources maintain that "any move to revoke AFSPA in Jammu and Kashmir would be detrimental to the security of the Valley and would provide a boost to the terrorists."

Former Indian Army Chief General V. K. Singh rejected the accusations that the action was not taken in the cases of human rights violations by Army personnel. On 24 October 2010, he has said that 104 Army personnel had been punished in Jammu and Kashmir in this regard, including 39 officers. He also said that 95% of the allegations of human rights abuses against Indian Army were proved to be false, of which he remarked, had apparently been made with the "ulterior motive of maligning the armed forces". However, according to Human Rights Watch, the military courts in India, in general, were proven to be incompetent to deal with cases of serious human rights abuses and were responsible in covering up evidence and protecting the involved officers. Amnesty International in its report in 2015, titled "Denied"-Failures in Accountability in Jammu and Kashmir, says, "...with respect to investigations, an inquiry that is conducted by the same authority accused of the crime raises serious questions about the independence and impartiality of those proceedings", adding that according to the international law, an independent authority that is not involved in the alleged violations has to investigate such crimes.

These human rights violations are said to have contributed to the rise of resistance in Kashmir.

=== ISI's role ===
The Pakistani Inter-Services Intelligence has encouraged and aided the Kashmir independence movement through an insurgency due to its dispute on the legitimacy of Indian rule in Kashmir, with the insurgency as an easy way to keep Indian troops distracted and cause international condemnation of India. Former Pakistan President General Pervez Musharraf in Oct 2014 said during TV interview, "We have source (in Kashmir) besides the (Pakistan) army...People in Kashmir are fighting against (India). We just need to incite them."

The Federal Bureau of Investigation (FBI), in their first ever open acknowledgement in 2011 in US Court, said that the Inter-Services Intelligence (ISI) sponsors and oversees separatist militant groups in Kashmir.

In 2019, Prime Minister of Pakistan Imran Khan publicly discouraged Pakistani people from going to Kashmir to do a jihad. People who went to Kashmir will do an "injustice to the Kashmiri people". Most of the Pakistani militants who had crossed the border over the years and were caught by the Indian security forces were found to belong to the Punjab province of Pakistan.

=== Mujahideen influence ===
After the Mujahideen victory in the Soviet–Afghan War, Mujahideen militants, under the Operation Tupac with the aid of Pakistan, slowly infiltrated Kashmir with the goal of spreading a radical Islamist ideology to wage Jihad against India in the region.

=== Other motivations ===
==== Psychological ====
Psychologist Waheeda Khan, explaining the rebellious nature of the Kashmiris, says that because of the tense situations in the valley from the 1990s, the generation gap between parents and young generations has increased. Young generations tend to blame their parents for failing to do anything about the political situation. So they start experimenting with their own aggressive ways to show their curbed feelings and would go against any authority. A prominent psychiatrist of the valley, Margoob, described that children/teenagers are much more vulnerable to passionate actions and reactions, since the young minds are yet to completely develop psychological mechanisms. When they assume that they are "pushed against the wall", they get controlled by the emotions without bothering about the consequences. Also young people easily identify themselves with the "group" rather than with their individual identities. It leads to psychological distress which causes antisocial behaviour and aggressive attitude. Often, this situation gets worsened by the availability of weapons and people becoming familiar to violence after having exposed to conflict for so long. Waheeda Khan remarks, the major concern is that generations of children who are experiencing long-term violence in their lives, may reach adulthood perceiving that violence is a fair means of solving ethnic, religious, or political differences.

==== Economic ====
High unemployment and lack of economic opportunities in Kashmir are also said to have intensified the struggle.

== Stone pelting ==
Following the 2008 protests and 2010 unrest, the turmoil took on a new dimension when people, particularly young people of the Kashmir valley began pelting stones on security forces to express their aggression and protest for the loss of freedom. In turn they get attacked by the armed personnel with pellets, rubber bullets, sling shots and tear gas shells. This leads to eye-injuries and several other kind of injuries to many people. Security forces also face injuries, and sometimes get beaten up during these events. According to Waheeda Khan, most of the 'stone-pelters' are school and college going students. Large number of these people get arrested during these events for allegedly resorting to stone pelting, after which some of them are also tortured. According to political activist Mannan Bukhari, Kashmiris made stone, an easily accessible and defenseless weapon, their weapon of choice for protest.

Kashmiri senior journalist Parvaiz Bukhari remarked:

The summer of 2010 witnessed a convulsion in the world's most militarized zone, the Indian-controlled part of Kashmir, an unprecedented and deadly civil unrest that is beginning to change a few things on the ground. [...] Little known and relatively anonymous resistance activists emerged, organizing an unarmed agitation more fierce than the armed rebellion against Indian rule two decades earlier. And apparently aware of the post 9/11 world, young Kashmiris, children of the conflict, made stones and rocks a weapon of choice against government armed forces, side-stepping the tag of a terrorist movement linked with Pakistan. The unrest represents a conscious transition to an unarmed mass movement, one that poses a moral challenge to New Delhi's military domination over the region.

== Human rights abuses by militants and army ==
Islamic separatist militants are accused of violence against the Kashmir populace. On the other hand, the Indian army has also allegedly committed serious crimes like using pellet guns, torture, murder and rape, though many such incidents were subject to legal proceedings. Militants killed many civil servants and alleged agents of the state, with Hindus disproportionately affected. Tens of thousands of Kashmiri Pandits migrated away from Kashmir due to fear surrounding increasing violence in Kashmir. Scholar and British diplomat Alexander Evans estimated that approximately 160–170,000 Kashmiri Hindus were displaced.

Over 8,000 people have disappeared as a result of counterinsurgency operations, and there are 6,000 unmarked and mass graves in Kashmir. The Association of Parents of Disappeared Persons (APDP) was formed in the early 1990s by parents of victims of enforced disappearance to seek justice for the victims through the Indian court system.

=== Notable incidents ===
==== Abuses by security forces ====
- 1990 Gawkadal massacre – On January 21, 1990, CRPF personnel opened fire on a large crowd of protestors marching toward Lal Chowk at the Gawkadal Bridge in Srinagar, as per a witness, resulting in many deaths. according to a witness account from survivor Farooq Wani, security personnel loaded 30 to 35 bodies onto a truck and subsequently threw remaining victims off the bridge into the Jhelum River after running out of space in the vehicle.
- 1990 Zakoora and Tengpora massacre
- 1991 Kunan Poshpora incident – On February 23, 1991, soldiers from the 4th Rajputana Rifles conducted a search operation in the village of Kunan Poshpora, according to villager testimonies, male villagers were gathered at three designated sites, where men reported being tortured during the night, and hearing women screaming from nearby homes. Female residents stated that soldiers raped 40 women and girls in their residences, in some cases by multiple men. Three weeks after the incident, a physician at the nearest medical centre in Kupwara examined 32 women and girls aged 15 to 70; the physician documented lesions and abrasions on the bodies of all examined individuals, along with a bite mark on one survivor's face. It is believed that several teenage girls refrained from undergoing medical examination due to concerns over social stigma.
- 1994 Kupwara massacre
- 1993 Bijbehara massacre – In October 1993, BSF personnel opened fired on a crowd protesting the military siege of JKLF militants at the Hazratbal Shrine. The incident, which occurred in Bijbehara, resulted in at least 37 protesters being killed.
- Hawal massacre – On May 21, 1990, Following the assassination of Mirwaiz Maulvi Farooq by Hizbul Mujahideen militants, CRPF personnel opened fire on his funeral procession, with reports documenting over 60 people killed.
- 1993 Sopore massacre – On January 6, 1993, a major incident occurred in Sopore, according to eyewitness testimonies gathered by Amnesty International, the BSF set fire to homes and shops, looted property, and fired upon civilians, following a militant attack on a security petrol. Witnesses interviewed described being shot at, observing arson attacks on houses, and passengers forced off buses before being killed. From these accounts, Amnesty International reported that between 55 and 85 civilians were killed and at least 200 shops and homes were destroyed during the incident.
- 1993 Lal Chowk fire – On April 10, 1993, a major fire occurred in the Lal Chowk area of Srinagar. According to a report by Human Rights Watch (HRW), BSF personnel opened fire on civilians following the burning of a vacated BSF building. HRW documented that BSF personnel fired intermittently at civilians, and obstructed local police officers from rescuing people trapped in burning buildings. A local resident interviewed by HRW stated that they saw BSF personnel pouring liquid on buildings before they caught on fire. The organization documented that 127 families were left displaced by the arson, four people were killed, and several additional individuals were killed while attempting to flee aboard shikaras.
- 1990 Handwara massacre
- 2020 Amshipora murders
- 2016–2017 Kashmir unrest

==== Abuses by militant groups ====
- Kidnapping of Rubaiya Sayeed – In December 1989, Rubaiya Sayeed, daughter of Indian Home Minister Mufti Mohammad Sayeed, was kidnapped by the JKLF, the organization demanded the release of five JKLF militants in exchange for her return. Five days after her abduction, she was released unharmed following the release of the five prisoners.
- Exodus of Kashmiri Hindus
- 1993 Kishtwar massacre – In August 1993, militants intercepted a bus near Kishtwar and killed 16 Hindu passengers after separating them from the Muslim passengers. Following the incident, a hartal condemning the massacre was called in Kishtwar by Maulana Farooq Hussain Kitchloo, the Imam of the local mosque.
- 2002 Qasim Nagar massacre – In July 2002, militants attacked a migrant labourer colony in the Qasim Nagar area of Jammu. The attackers threw grenades at a shop before opening fire on residents, most of whom were Hindu migrant labourers from Bihar, Odisha, and Uttar Pradesh. The attack resulted in 27 people killed and 30 injured.
- Mehjoor Nagar Sikh massacre
- 1998 Wandhama massacre – On January 26, 1998, 26 Kashmiri Pandits were killed by militants in the town of Wandhama. According to HRW, the victims included several women and children, and during the attack, militants set fire to a Hindu temple and a house.
- 2003 Nadimarg massacre – On March 23–24, 2003, militants, reported to be from LeT, entered the village of Nadimarg and killed 24 Kashmiri Pandit residents. The victims, which included 11 women and two young children, were lined up and shot. Among those killed, the victims ranged in age from 2 to 65 years old.
- 1998 Chapnari massacre
- 2006 Doda massacre – In May 2006, 35 Hindus were killed by LeT militants in remote areas of the Doda and Udhampur districts.
- 1997 Sangrampora massacre
- 1998 Prankote massacre
- 2002 Raghunath temple attacks
- 2002 Amarnath pilgrimage massacre
- 2025 Pahalgam attack

== Tactics ==
=== India ===
The Indian government has increasingly relied on military presence to control the insurgency. The military has allegedly committed human rights violations. The government would often dissolve assemblies, arrest elected politicians and impose president's rule. The government also rigged elections in 1987. In recent times there have been signs that the government is taking local elections more seriously. The government has also funneled development aid to Kashmir and Kashmir has now become the biggest per capita receiver of Federal aid.

=== Pakistan ===
The Pakistani central government originally supported, trained and armed the insurgency in Kashmir, sometimes known as "ultras" (extremists), however after groups linked to the Kashmiri insurgency twice attempted to assassinate president Pervez Musharraf, Musharraf decided to end support for such groups. His successor, Asif Ali Zardari has continued the policy, calling insurgents in Kashmir "terrorists".

But the Pakistani Inter-Services Intelligence hasn't followed the lead of the government and has reportedly continued its support for insurgent groups in Kashmir. In 2008, 541 people died due to insurgency, The Economist called it the lowest in two decades. The report cited a reduction in the support for militants by Pakistan and war fatigue among the Kashmiris as the reasons for the reduction in casualty figures.

=== Insurgents ===
After around 2000, the insurgency became far less violent and has instead taken on the form of protests and marches. Certain groups have also chosen to lay down their arms and look for a peaceful resolution to the conflict.

=== Groups ===
The different insurgent groups have different aims in Kashmir. Some want complete independence from both India and Pakistan, others want unification with Pakistan and still others just want greater autonomy from the Indian government.

A 2010 survey found that 43% of the people in J&K and 44% of the people in AJK would favour complete independence from both India and Pakistan, with support for the independence movement unevenly distributed across the region.

== Militant groups ==
Over the last two years, the militant group, Lashkar-e-Toiba has split into two factions: Al Mansurin and Al Nasirin. Another new group reported to have emerged is the "Save Kashmir Movement". Harkat-ul-Mujahideen (formerly known as Harkat-ul-Ansar) and Lashkar-e-Toiba are believed to be operating from Muzaffarabad, and Muridke, Pakistan respectively.

Other less well known groups are the Freedom Force and Farzandan-e-Milat. A smaller group, Al-Badr, has been active in Kashmir for many years and is still believed to be functioning. All Parties Hurriyat Conference, an organisation that uses moderate means to press for the rights of the Kashmiris, is often considered as the mediator between New Delhi and insurgent groups.

=== Al-Qaeda ===
It is unclear if Al Qaeda has a presence in Jammu and Kashmir. In 2002, Donald Rumsfeld suggested that they were active and in the same year the SAS hunted for Osama bin Laden in Jammu and Kashmir. Al Qaeda claims that it has established a base in Jammu and Kashmir. However, there has been no evidence for any of these assertions. The Indian army also claims that there is no evidence of Al Qaeda presence in Jammu and Kashmir. Al Qaeda has established bases in Pakistani administered Kashmir and some, including Robert Gates have suggested that they have helped to plan attacks in India.

== Casualties ==
According to government data, around 41,000 people—consisting of 14,000 civilians, 5,000 security personnel and 22,000 militants—have died because of the insurgency as of March 2017 in both Kashmir Valley and Jammu region. The overwhelming majority of these deaths happened in the 1990s and early 2000s, and there has been a steady decline in violence and sharp drop in the number of deaths 2004 onwards. A 2006 report by Human Rights Watch claimed that at least 20,000 civilians had died in the conflict by then. The territory witnessed about 69,820 militancy-related incidents till March 2017. Among the militants killed between 1989 and 2002, about 3,000 were from outside Jammu and Kashmir (mostly from Pakistan and some Afghans). Indian forces engaged in counter insurgency operations captured around 40,000 firearms, 150,000 explosive devices, and over 6 million rounds of assorted ammunition during this period. Jammu and Kashmir Coalition of Civil Society posits a figure of 70,000 deaths, most of them civilians. The pro-Pakistan Huriyat group has claimed a higher death toll of 80,000 including civilians, security forces and militants. The districts with the most incidents of killing were Kupwara, Baramulla, Poonch, Doda, Anantnag and Pulwama.

Casualties every year in the Jammu and Kahmir insurgency (since 2007)
Year	Incidents of Killing	Civilians	Security Forces	Militants	Total
2007	427	127	119	498	744
2008	261	71	85	382	538
2009	208	53	73	247	373
2010	189	34	69	258	361
2011	119	33	31	117	181
2012	70	19	18	84	121
2013	84	19	53	100	172
2014	91	28	47	114	189
2015	86	19	41	115	175
2016	112	14	88	165	267
2017	163	54	83	220	357
2018	206	86	95	271	452
2019	135	42	78	163	283
2020	140	33	56	232	321
2021	153	36	45	193	274
2022	151	30	30	193	253
2023	72	12	33	87	134
2024	61	31	26	69	127
2025	35	28	17	46	92

== Surrender and rehabilitation policy ==
Surrendering in Jammu and Kashmir has been institutionalized over the years. The 1990s saw some surrender policies, while in the 2000s, there was a policy for militants belonging to Indian administered Jammu and Kashmir and another for Pakistan administered territory. The first surrender policy for militants in Kashmir was launched on 15 August 1995. It was a copy of the policies already there for Naxalites.

=== Appeals to surrender ===
Appeals to surrender are made by security forces to militants at encounter sites as well. Some attempts are successful, while others are not. Mothers and other family members have made videos urging their child turned militant to surrender to the security forces. Sometimes the family member is brought to the encounter site and urged to talk to their children through loudspeakers to surrender.

== See also ==
- Kashmir conflict
- India–Pakistan wars and conflicts
- 2018 Sunjuwan attack
- List of massacres in Jammu and Kashmir
- All Parties Hurriyat Conference
- Pakistan and state-sponsored terrorism
- Partition of India
- Ikhwan (Kashmir)

== Bibliography ==
- Evans, Alexander (2002). "A departure from history: Kashmiri Pandits, 1990–2001". Contemporary South Asia. 11 (1): 19–37. doi:10.1080/0958493022000000341. ISSN 0958-4935. S2CID 145573161.
- Khan, Waheeda (2015), "Conflict in Kashmir: Psychosocial Consequences on Children", in Sibnath Deb (ed.), Child Safety, Welfare and Well-being: Issues and Challenges, Springer, pp. 83–93, ISBN 978-81-322-2425-9
