= Hawal massacre =

Massacre in Srinagar where CRPF troops opened fire on a funeral procession in 1990

- Part of Human rights abuses in Jammu and Kashmir
- Location: Hawal, Kashmir, India
- Date: May 21, 1990; 36 years ago
- Target: Civilians
- Attack type: Massacre, Mass shooting
- Deaths: 60–70 killed
- Injuries: 200+ wounded
- Perpetrator: Central Reserve Police Force
- Litigation: Investigation executed by SHRC, no action was taken against the CRPF personnel.

The Hawal Massacre took place on 21 May 1990 in the Hawal area of Srinagar, Kashmir, when troops of the Indian Central Reserve Police Force opened fire on a funeral procession carrying the body of Mirwaiz Moulana Muhammad Farooq, who had been assassinated by Muhammad Ahsan Dar and Mohammad Abdullah Bangroo, of the terrorist group Hizbul Mujahideen at his residence in Nageen. The procession, which was making its way from SKIMS Soura to Mirwaiz Manzil in Rajouri Kadal, was attacked as it passed through the Hawal area.

== Massacre ==
Mirwaiz Moulana Muhammad Farooq who was the then Mirwaiz of Kashmir had been brutally killed by gunmen at his residence and his followers took his body in a funeral procession towards Mirwaiz Manzil when the paramilitary personnel stationed in a camp at Islamia College started indiscriminately firing using their machine guns trained at the peaceful procession.

Victims of the attack state how the massacre was completely unprovoked and they were all unarmed yet the forces fired thousands of bullets. Over 60 were killed and 200 were injured in the massacre and this remains to be one of the deadliest massacres in Kashmir.

== Aftermath ==
The then Governor had announced a ‘time-bound’ inquiry into the massacre within a period of two months. However, in reply to an RTI application in 2013, the then divisional commissioner Kashmir had stated that a criminal case vide FIR 35/1990 was registered into the incident at Nowhatta police station. He further mentioned that there was no information regarding any judicial or magisterial inquiry ordered by the government.

On a petition by a human rights activist, the State Human Rights Commission (SHRC) in 2014 ordered time bound inquiry into the massacre and sought a report from the government within two months. Despite various communications addressed to the Director General of Police, Divisional Commissioner Kashmir, and the Secretary of the Commission, the authorities remained unresponsive. In light of the authorities' insensitivity, the SHRC entrusted the inquiry to its own investigating wing.

In December 2017, the investigation wing of the SHRC found that the CRPF had identified 15 of its officers and personnel for “indiscriminate firing” that killed “35 civilians at Hawal in 1990. “The SHRC investigation, however, could not ascertain if any action was taken against these CRPF officers and personnel.

== See also ==
- Gawkadal massacre
- Zakoora and Tengpora massacre
- Sopore massacre
- Handwara massacre
- Bijbehara massacre
- Human rights abuses in Jammu and Kashmir
