= Human rights abuses in Kashmir =

Abuses in India and Pakistan

Human rights abuses in Kashmir have been perpetrated by various belligerents in the territories controlled by both India and Pakistan since the two countries' conflict over the region began with their first war in 1947–1948, shortly after the partition of British India. The organized breaches of fundamental human rights in Kashmir are tied to the contested territorial status of the region, over which India and Pakistan have fought multiple wars. More specifically, the issue pertains to abuses committed in Indian-administered Kashmir (comprising the territories of Jammu and Kashmir and Ladakh) and in Pakistani-administered Kashmir (comprising the territories of Azad Jammu and Kashmir and Gilgit–Baltistan).

== Indian-administered Kashmir ==
=== Incidents near the Line of Control (LoC) with Pakistan ===
The Line of Control (LOC) is a military control line between Indian and Pakistani-controlled parts of Kashmir. The line does not constitute a legally international boundary but it is a de facto border, designated in 1948 as a cease-fire line, it divided Kashmir into two parts and closed the Jehlum valley route, the only entrance of the Kashmir Valley. This territorial division which, to this day still exists severed many villages and separated family members from each other. The landmines planted by the Army alongsides of the line have killed scores of innocent people and left thousands as disabled. Without compensation, these disabled persons in the Indian Kashmir are fighting for the survival.

During 2008 Kashmir unrest, the Hindu extremist groups and the supporters of Bharatiya Janata Party blocked the Srinagar-Jammu National highway (NH 1A). The only national highway which connects Kashmir Valley to the rest of India remained closed for several days and stopped the supply of essential commodities. In response to the blockade, on 11 August 2008, under the leadership of Sheikh Abdul Aziz, 50,000 to 2,50,000 Kashmiri protesters attempted to cross the Line of Control to Muzaffarabad. The protesters were stopped at Uri which resulted in killing of fifteen people and hundreds injured when police and Indian paramilitary forces fired on them. A slogan raised by the protesters was, Khooni lakir tod do aar paar jod do (Break down the blood-soaked Line of Control let Kashmir be united again).

=== Jammu and Kashmir ===
Human rights abuses in Jammu and Kashmir, a disputed territory administered by India, are an ongoing issue. The allegations range from mass killings, forced disappearances, torture, rape and sexual abuse to suppression of freedom of speech and bans on religious gatherings. Several massacres have taken place in the region since 1990. The Indian Army, Central Reserve Police Force, Border Security personnel and various militant groups have been accused of committing severe human rights abuses against Kashmiri civilians.

According to official figures released in the Jammu and Kashmir assembly around 47,000 people—including 7,000 police personnel and 20,000 militants—have died because of the insurgency as of July 2009, and 3,400 have disappeared. According to a 2006 report by Human Rights Watch, at least 20,000 civilians have died in the conflict. A WikiLeaks issue accused India of systemic human rights abuses, it stated that US diplomats possessed evidence of the apparent widespread use of torture by Indian police and security forces.

India rejected a UN panel in April 2019 asking about steps taken by New Delhi to address alleged abuses listed in their OHCHR report. Amnesty International halted its operation in India in September 2020 after alleged government freezing of its bank accounts, which the rights group partly attributed to its calls for Indian authorities to account for "grave human rights violations in Delhi riots and Jammu & Kashmir." India's National Investigation Agency raided several NGOs in October 2020 for alleged funding to terror activities in Jammu and Kashmir, the action was criticized by a spokesman for activist Parveena Ahanger as a case of "crackdown on the human rights defenders in Kashmir".

==== Indian security forces ====
In September 1990 the Armed Forces (Special Powers) Act was enacted in Jammu and Kashmir after passing in the Parliament of India to handle the rise in Kashmir Insurgency. Human rights group Amnesty claim that the special powers under (AFSPA) gives the security force immunity from alleged violations committed, and condemn it. United Nations High Commissioner for Human Rights Navanethem Pillay has urged India to repeal AFSPA and to investigate the disappearances in Kashmir.

On 26 February 2009 the Chief Minister stated the act should be repealed, the security forces however said that revoking the act would be detrimental to security and help terrorist moral, though the militancy has declined the act is still in force International NGO's as well as the US state department have documented excesses such as disappearances, torture and arbitrary executions carried out during India's counter terrorism operations.

Human rights watch has also accused the Indian Security Forces of using children as spies and messengers, India army have targeted reporters and human rights activists, they have also been accused of committing over 200 rapes in an attempt to intimidate the local population. Wikileaks cables are reported to contain material stating that the International Committee of the Red Cross briefed US officials in India, alleging that India "condoned" torture and that "sexual penetration" formed part of the maltreatment of victims. The ICRC alleged that of the 1296 detainees interviewed, 681 had reported of being tortured. Of those, 304 individuals complained of sexual torture/abuse.

In 2005 Médecins Sans Frontières conducted a survey in Kashmir which found that the number of people who had witnessed a rape in Kashmir since 1989 was comparably far higher than the number of people who had witnessed a rape in other conflict zones such as Chechnya and Sri Lanka. The survey found that 13% of respondents had witnessed rape and 11.6% of the interviewees had themselves been victims of sexual abuse since 1989. Dr Seema Kazi states that rapes committed by Indian security forces outstrips the rapes committed by militants in both scale and frequency. Professor William Baker stated at the 52nd United Nations Commission on Human Rights that rape in Kashmir was an active strategy of the Indian forces to humiliate Kashmiri people.

In April 2002, authorities in Indian-administered Kashmir arrested three Indian paramilitary soldiers following the gang rape of 17-year-old girl. In July 2011, there were anti-India protests in Srinagar against the alleged rape of a 25-year-old village woman in the village of Manzgam.

In October 2011, the Chief Minister of Jammu and Kashmir apologised for the release of names, parentages and addresses of 1400 rape victims. However, no details were revealed as to whether the rapes were by security forces, militants or part of crime. Liaquat Ali Khan, an academic writer considers that these excesses in Kashmir do not have official sanction but are easy to commit because of the powers, to cordon and search villages and suburbs, that are vested to security forces by the law. The authorities use association with terrorists to discredit the testimony of the victims, in case the association is established. The security forces have carried out extrajudicial killings, assaults and other human rights violations. An investigation by the Jammu and Kashmir state human rights commission has found 2730 bodies in unmarked graves at 38 sites in northern Kashmir. At least 574 of these were identified as being local people.

On April 9, 2017, in the Kashmir human shield incident a 26-year-old man captured by the Indian Army, was tied to the front of a Jeep belonging to Indian Army as a column of Indian troops was moving through a locality. The man was reportedly tied to the vehicle to dissuade other Kashmiri insurgents from hurling stones at the Indian troops. The man was accused of being involved in throwing stones at Indian troops. The Government of India stated that it would stand by the officer who took the decision to use the insurgent as a human shield. J&K Human Rights Commission ordered the Government of Jammu and Kashmir to pay 10 Lakh Rupees as compensation to man used as human shield. Jammu and Kashmir government refused to pay. Major Leetul Gogoi was awarded a Chief of Army Staff Commendation Card by General Bipin Rawat for counter-insurgency operations, which included tying a Kashmiri protester to a jeep as a human shield.

Reports of torture emerged in 2019 during the Jammu and Kashmir lockdown, with 3,000 Kashmir residents purportedly detained on 29 August. Activists on 25 September of the same year found that roughly 13,000 boys had been detained since 5 August, claiming that Indian authorities used excessive force during arrest and torture on some of the boys while imprisoned.

A joint 2020 survey from New York's Skidmore College and a Kashmiri university found that 91% of polled college students wanted a complete withdrawal of Indian forces from the region.

==== Muslim militants ====
The rapes by Islamic militants have been reported since the Indo-Pakistani War of 1947. On 22 October 1947, Pashtun militants invaded Baramulla in a Pakistan army truck, and raped women including European nuns. In March 1990, the wife of a BSF inspector was kidnapped, tortured and gang-raped for many days. Then her body with broken limbs was abandoned on a road. On 14 April 1990, a Kashmiri Pandit nurse from the Sher-i-Kashmir Institute of Medical Sciences in Srinagar was gang-raped and then beaten to death by terrorists. Jammu Kashmir Liberation Front (JKLF) took responsibility for the crime, accusing Bhat of informing the police about the presence of militants in the hospital. On 6 June 1990, a lab assistant at the Government Girls High School Trehgam, was kidnapped and gang raped for many days. Then she was sliced at a sawmill.

Prana Ganjoo was abducted with her husband in Sopore. She was gang-raped for a number of days before they were both killed in November 1990.

From 1993, reports of rape by Islamic militants had increased, and there were many cases of the militants threatening to kill the family unless a woman was handed over to the militants. According to the HRW, the rape victims of militants suffered ostracism and there was a "code of silence and fear" that prevented people from reporting such abuse. According to the HRW, the investigation of case of rape by militants was difficult because many Kashmiris were reluctant to discuss it for the fear of violent reprisals. The increase in number of rape cases resulted in an increased number of abortions, leading to one case of murder of doctor. The doctor was accused of being an informer by the Islamic groups Hezb-ul Mujahidin and Al Jehad. In January 1991, a woman was forcibly asked to "marry" a militant. Her brother was killed when the family refused, and the girl was taken away. On 30 March 1992, armed militants demanded food and shelter from the family of a retired truck driver in Nai Sadak, Kralkhud. The family complied, but the militants killed the owner and raped his daughter and wife. Then both the women were also shot dead. Another women was forced to marry the Hizb-ul-Mujahideen commander Farooq Ansari in Kishtwar in 2000. In 2005, a 14-year-old Gujjar girl was abducted from Lurkoti village by the Lashkar-e-Taiba militants, and forced to marry one of them. She was gang-raped by her "husband" and his militant friends. In December 2005, 15-year-old of Bajoni (Doda district) was forced to marry a Hizb-ul-Mujahideen militant, after her family was threatened with death. Periodic reports by Amnesty, International Commission of Jurists, Human Rights Watch and the US state department had documented massive human rights violations by militant groups supported by Pakistan.

===== Violence against Hindus =====
During the eruption of militancy in Kashmir valley, terrorism by majority sect specifically targeted the Hindu Kashmiri Pandits minority and violated their human rights. Reports by Indian government state 219 Kashmiri pandits were killed and around 140,000 migrated due to militancy while over 3000 stayed in the valley. Reports from Amnesty International, Human Rights Watch and the International Commission of Jurists confirmed Indian reports of systematic human rights violations by Pakistan-backed militants.

According to a report published by Asia Watch:

In Kashmir, the militant forces do not control territory and their military operations are generally characterised by ambushes of government forces and hit-and-run attacks for which they rely on weapons such as AK-47s, grenades, mines and other small arms. However, the guerrillas command considerable support throughout the valley and may take refuge among local civilians following these operations. Unable to locate or identify the militants, government forces routinely respond to the attacks by retaliating against entire villages, killing and assaulting civilians and destroying their property.

According to a resolution passed by the United States Congress in 2006, Islamic terrorists infiltrated the region in 1989 and forced most of the Kashmiri Pandits to flee Kashmir. According to the report, the population of Kashmiri Pandits in Kashmir had declined from 400,000 in 1989 to 4,000 in 2011. These groups targeted the Hindus in the Kashmir valley forcing an estimated 100,000 to flee.

From 1994 to 1998, the Jammu Kashmir Liberation Front were accused of ethnic cleansing by using murder, arson and rape as a weapon of war to drive out hundreds of thousands of Pandits from the region. On 25 January 1998, 23 Kashmiri Pandits, including nine women and four young children living in the village of Wandhama, were killed by unknown persons wearing the uniforms of Indian Army soldiers, who had tea with them, waiting for a radio message indicating that all Pandit families in the village had been covered. Thereafter, they rounded up all the members of the Hindu households and then summarily gunned them down with Kalashnikov rifles.

Hindu civilians were reported in 2005 to have been subject to rape and murder perpetrated by members of terrorist organisations like the JKLF and the Hizbul Mujahideen. Muslim civilians who were considered political opponents of terrorists or those who were believed to be informers had also been raped or murdered.

== Pakistani-administered Kashmir ==
=== Azad Jammu and Kashmir ===
Pakistan, an Islamic Republic, imposes multiple restrictions on peoples' religious freedom. Religious minorities also face unofficial economic and societal discrimination and have been targets of sectarian violence.

The constitution of Azad Kashmir specifically prohibits activities that may be prejudicial to the state's accession to Pakistan, and as such regularly suppresses demonstrations against the government. A number of Islamist militant groups operate in this area including Al-Qaeda, with tacit permission from Pakistan's intelligence.

There have been allegations of human rights abuse. A report titled "Kashmir: Present Situation and Future Prospects", which was submitted to the European Parliament by Emma Nicholson, Baroness Nicholson of Winterbourne, was critical of the lack of human rights, justice, democracy, and Kashmiri representation in the Pakistan National Assembly. According to the Human Rights Commission of Pakistan, Pakistan's Inter Services Intelligence operates in Pakistan-administered Kashmir and is involved in extensive surveillance, arbitrary arrests, torture, and murder. Generally this is done with impunity and perpetrators go unpunished. The 2008 report by the United Nations High Commissioner for Refugees determined that Pakistan-administered Kashmir was 'Not free'. According to Shaukat Ali Kashmiri, chairman of the International Kashmir Alliance, "On one hand Pakistan claims to be the champion of the right of self-determination of the Kashmiri people, but she has denied the same rights under its controlled parts of Kashmir and Gilgit-Baltistan".

In December 2009, activists of nationalist Kashmiri groups staged a protest in Muzaffarabad to condemn the alleged rigging of elections and killing of an 18-year-old student during the elections. The killing had led to widespread protests in the district.

Large protests erupted during the February 2012 Kohistan Killings where 18 people were ordered off from a bus and killed by gunmen on the Islamabad-Gilgit route. The act drew condemnation from the UN Secretary-General Ban Ki-moon.

In October 2019, the protesters were demanding that Azad Kashmir's existing legislative assembly be converted into a constitutional assembly and the area's unification with the Gilgit-Baltistan region. As a result of the police trying to stop the rally, 100 people were injured.

=== Gilgit–Baltistan ===
The main demand of the people of Gilgit-Baltistan is a constitutional status to the region as a fifth province of Pakistan. However, Pakistan claims that Gilgit-Baltistan cannot be given constitutional status due to Pakistan's commitment to the 1948 UN resolution. In 2007, International Crisis Group stated that "Almost six decades after Pakistan's independence, the constitutional status of the Federally Administered Northern Areas (Gilgit and Baltistan), once part of the former princely state of Jammu and Kashmir and now under Pakistani control, remains undetermined, with political autonomy a distant dream. The region's inhabitants are embittered by Islamabad's unwillingness to devolve powers in real terms to its elected representatives. The rise of sectarian extremism is an alarming consequence of this denial of basic political rights".

In 2009, the Pakistan government implemented an autonomy package for Gilgit-Baltistan which entails rights similar to those of Pakistan's other provinces. Gilgit-Baltistan thus gains province-like status without actually being conferred such a status constitutionally. The direct rule by Islamabad is replaced by an elected legislative assembly and its chief minister.

There has been criticism and opposition to this move in Pakistan, India, and Pakistan administrated Kashmir. The move has been dubbed as an eyewash to hide the real mechanics of power, which allegedly are under the direct control of the Pakistani federal government. The package was opposed by Pakistani Kashmiri politicians who claimed that the integration of Gilgit-Baltistan into Pakistan would undermine their case for the independence of Kashmir from India. 300 activists from Kashmiri groups protested during the first Gilgit-Baltistan legislative assembly elections, with some carrying banners reading "Pakistan's expansionist designs in Gilgit-Baltistan are unacceptable". However, many people of Gilgit-Baltistan oppose integration into Kashmir. They want their region to be merged into Pakistan as a separate province.

== See also ==
- Kashmir conflict, a territorial conflict between India and Pakistan over the region of Kashmir
  - Human rights abuses in Jammu and Kashmir, an overview of organized abuses in Indian-administered territory
  - Human rights abuses in Azad Jammu and Kashmir, an overview of organized abuses in Pakistani-administered territory
- Human rights in India, an overview of the state of human rights throughout India
- Human rights in Pakistan, an overview of the state of human rights throughout Pakistan
- Peacebuilding in Jammu and Kashmir, confidence-building measures between India and Pakistan in the region
- Tika Lal Taploo

== Bibliography ==
- Bansal, Alok (2018). Gilgit-Baltistan and Its Saga of Unending Human Rights Violations. Asian Eurasian Human Rights Forum. Pentagon Press LLP. New Delhi. ISBN 9789386618610
