= 1994 Kupwara massacre =

Coordinates: 34.526°N 74.255°E

kupwara massacre
- Part of Human rights abuses in Jammu and Kashmir
- Location: Kupwara, Jammu and Kashmir, India
- Date: 27 January 1994
- Target: Kashmiri Civilians
- Attack type: Mass shooting
- Deaths: 27 killed
- Injuries: 38 wounded
- Perpetrator: Indian Army

Kupwara massacre refers to the killing of 27 Kashmiri civilians, including three policemen, by the Indian Army in Kupwara town, Jammu and Kashmir, on 27 January 1994. The incident occurred a day after the local population observed a strike on Republic Day. The massacre is considered one of the darkest days in the history of Kupwara.

== Background ==
On 25 January, the Punjab Regiment, part of the Indian Army, warned locals against observing a strike on Republic Day (26 January) and threatened dire consequences. Defying the warning, the people of Kupwara observed a complete shutdown on January 26.

== The Massacre ==
At approximately 11:00 AM on 27 January 1994, as shopkeepers were beginning to open their businesses, soldiers posted on Road Opening Party (ROP) duty, including personnel from the 31 Medium Regiment, opened fire from all the directions. Among the dead were traders, government employees, police personnel, and civilians. Witnesses described horrifying scenes of bloodshed and chaos. A forest guard, Ghulam Muhammad Mir, was killed after being mistaken for a policeman due to his khaki uniform. Survivors reported that soldiers prevented anyone from assisting the injured, even as some victims succumbed to their injuries in front of their loved ones. Another survivor noted that the soldiers appeared to be avenging the Republic Day strike and deliberately targeted civilians.

== Aftermath ==
After the massacre, local police registered FIR No. 19/94 under sections of the Ranbir Penal Code (RPC), including charges of murder (302) and attempted murder (307). The Criminal Investigation Department (CID) confirmed that the firing was unprovoked and unjustified, but the Indian Army refused to cooperate with the investigation. The case was closed in 1997 without any charges filed.

In 2012, the CID informed the State Human Rights Commission (SHRC) that the 31 Medium Regiment, under 2nd Lieutenant Colonel S. Bakhshi, was responsible for the killings. However, the Indian Army invoked the Armed Forces (Special Powers) Act (AFSPA) to block prosecution

== See also ==
- 1993 Bijbehara massacre
- 1990 Gawkadal massacre
- 1990 Handwara massacre
- Human rights abuses in Jammu and Kashmir
- 1993 Sopore massacre
