= Human rights abuses in Azad Kashmir =

Organized breaches of fundamental human rights in Pakistani-administered Kashmir

Human rights abuses in Azad Kashmir, Pakistan have been a major issue, ranging from forced disappearances, claimed torture to political repression and electoral fraud and suppression of freedom of speech. According to the human rights commission of Pakistan, Inter-Services Intelligence (ISI) carries out extensive surveillance operations on the press and pro-independence groups, they have carried out arbitrary arrests in which people have been tortured and several have died. Asian Legal Resource Centre (ALRC) is cited to indicate that dozens have disappeared after their arrests in Pakistan-held Kashmir. A significant number of cases point to the Inter-Services Intelligence’s involvement in these disappearances".

Brad Adams, the Asia director at Human Rights Watch has said in 2006 "Although ‘azad’ means ‘free,’ the residents of Azad Kashmir are anything but free. The Pakistani authorities govern Azad Kashmir with strict controls on basic freedoms". Adams cited a law where those who opposed Pakistan's position on Kashmir were not allowed to contest regional elections, as an example of "political repression". The report also detailed it could not find evidence that Pakistan's security agencies were held accountable for incidents involving torture or mistreatment.

Adams says that the problems were not "rampant" but they needed to be addressed, and that the severity of human rights issues in Indian-administered Kashmir were "much, much, much greater". Pakistan's Information Minister Tariq Azim Khan rejected the contents of the report and said that Azad Kashmir was free of human rights violations.

The United Nations OHCHR reports on Kashmir document a number of human rights violations in "PaK" - "Restrictions on the rights to freedom of expression and association, impact of counter-terrorism on human rights, land rights, restrictions on the freedom of religion or belief and enforced or involuntary disappearances."

== Pakistan's official response ==
In response to the Human Rights Watch report, Tariq Azim (former Information Minister) said: “This report shows that the people who wrote it had lack of knowledge, and unfortunately they painted a wrong and misleading picture about the human rights situation in Azad Kashmir,” and rejected the report by stating: "Azad Kashmir is free of human rights violations."

In response to Pakistan's statement, Brad Adams (Asia Director, Human Rights Watch) said: “The extent and the severity of the human rights situation on the Indian side is much, much, much greater.” HRW clarified: “We are not saying that the problem is rampant (in Azad Kashmir),” and added: “We say that the problem needs to be addressed.” This acknowledges that issues exist in Azad Kashmir, but not at an extreme or widespread level. Pakistan often compares the situation in Azad Kashmir with Indian-administered Kashmir, which as per HRW’s own words makes the issue appear relatively smaller.

== Notable incidents ==
In 2011, Afzaal Suleria stated that the ISI kidnapped and killed a doctor which led to demonstrations against the ISI. While speaking to Dr Shabir Choudhry, Afzaal Suleria, President of the United Kashmir People's National Party - Azad Kashmir Chapter said:

“Another innocent Azad Kashmiri has become a victim of the ISI. We people are constantly harassed and victimised because we oppose the Pakistani occupation of our motherland.”

Other Kashmir National Party leaders, Abbas Butt, Dr Shabir Choudhry, Asim Mirza, Nawaz Majid, and others have strongly denounced this brutal killing and demanded those responsible must be held accountable for their actions.

On 7 May 2011, Dr Rizwan, resident of Muzaffarabad was kidnapped by ISI from his house and 23 May, he was killed.

Sardar Arif Shahid, President of All Parties National Alliance was allegedly assassinated by ISI on 14 May 2013 outside his house in Rawalpindi.

In October 2019, the People National Alliance organised a rally to free Kashmir from Pakistani rule. As a result of the police trying to stop the rally, 100 people were injured.

On 21 August 2020, Tanveer Ahmed, a British National, was arrested by police after he removed a Flag of Pakistan from a public square in Dadyal. In November, his wife told the BBC that he has held a number of hunger strikes in protest at being denied bail, had become extremely weak and is being tortured.

In January 2021, All Azad Kashmir School teachers Organisation had organized a peaceful rally for pay hike. Some 2,000 teachers took part in it. However, the police baton charged the protesters, leading to dozens being injured. Few days after this incident, 68 teachers were arrested by the police.

== Politics ==
According to Human Rights Watch,

the Pakistani government represses democratic freedoms, muzzles the press and practices routine torture.

Tight controls on freedom of expression have been a hallmark of government policy in Azad Kashmir. Pakistan has prevented the creation of independent media in the territory through bureaucratic restrictions and coercion. Under Azad Kashmir's constitution, which Pakistan enforced in 1974, election candidates are “prescreened” to ensure that only those who support Kashmir's union with Pakistan can contest elections. Anyone who wants to take part in public life in Azad Kashmir has to sign a pledge of loyalty to Pakistan, while anyone who publicly supports or peacefully works for an independent Kashmir faces persecution.

Brad Adams, Asia director at Human Rights Watch:

“The electoral law undermines Kashmiris’ basic political rights by barring them from seeking office if they oppose Kashmir's accession to Pakistan [..] Those who favor independence invite the ire of Pakistan's abusive intelligence agencies and military, and they risk being beaten and jailed.”

== See also ==
- Kashmir conflict, a territorial conflict between India and Pakistan over the region of Kashmir
  - Human rights abuses in Jammu and Kashmir, an overview of organized abuses in Indian-administered Kashmir
- Human rights in Pakistan, an overview of the state of human rights throughout Pakistan
  - Human rights violations in Balochistan, an overview of organized abuses in the Pakistani province of Balochistan related to a separatist insurgency in that region
  - Human rights abuses in Sindh, an aspect of politics and organized crime in the Pakistani province of Sindh
