= 1993 Lal Chowk fire =

Arson in Srinagar, Kashmir

- Part of Human rights abuses in Kashmir
- Location: Lal Chowk, Srinagar, Jammu & Kashmir, India
- Date: April 10, 1993; 33 years ago
- Target: Residents of the area, their homes, businesses, mosques, schools, and buildings
- Attack type: Arson, mass shooting, destruction of property
- Weapons: Guns, Flammable liquids
- Deaths: 125 killed
- Injuries: ~heavy
- Perpetrator: Indian Army

The 1993 Lal Chowk fire (literally Red Square) refers to the arson attack on the main commercial centre of downtown Srinagar, Kashmir, that took place on 10 April 1993. The fire is alleged by government officials to have been started by a crowd incited by militants, while civilians and police officials interviewed by Human Rights Watch and other organisations allege that the Indian Border Security Forces (BSF) set fire to the locality in retaliation for the burning of an abandoned BSF building by local residents. Over 125 civilians were killed in the conflagration and the ensuing shooting by BSF troops.

== The fire ==
On 9 April 1993 at approximately 11:30 PM, BSF troops abandoned the Sanatan Dharm Sabha which had been their base within Lal Chowk. On the morning of 10 April, the abandoned bases were set ablaze. As the fire continued to spread to neighbouring homes and businesses, the area was declared to be under curfew. Para-military forces arrived and were involved in a shootout which resulted in loss of life.

Jagmohan, then Governor of Jammu and Kashmir, in his memoir, alleges that the next morning the building was accosted by a crowd incited by a few militants who then proceeded to set the building on fire. The fire spread and engulfed the locality consuming over 50 homes and 260 shops. When the para-military forces arrived in response to the situation, they became engaged in a fire-fight for over four hours during which over 10,000 bullets were fired. In this and other incidents in the ensuing days, over 260 people died due to terrorism-related violence.

Human Rights Watch reported an unidentified Jammu and Kashmir police official as stating that the BSF had withdrawn forces the previous night without informing the police. The official stated that he had requested the BSF for protection of the building as such buildings vacated by security forces in the past had been burnt down. When he had approached the building, the crowd warned him not enter as it might be mined. He alleged that the building was ablaze before the tardy arrival of the BSF troops. He also alleged that tardy and limited response of government fire fighting resources led to the fire growing out of control despite the efforts of him and his men. When a company of approximately 100 BSF soldiers arrived, curfew orders were announced by megaphone, and the troops surrounded Lal Chowk and began firing indiscriminately.

Civilians interviewed by Human Rights Watch stated that the BSF did not allow the police to rescue of people. Another police official alleged that the BSF opened fire on civilians and the police. The New York Times reports that BSF forces fired on people fleeing their burning homes and businesses. Other witnesses stated that the external latches of the buildings had been closed trapping the people inside, supposedly by the security forces. A hotel waiter alleged that he had seen BSF troops spraying the buildings with flammable liquids.

== The shikara killings ==
As the fire continued to spread through Lal Chowk, a number of locals attempted to escape the flames by fleeing across the Jhelum River in boats. According to eyewitnesses, security personnel gathered on the river bank and opened fire on the boats with machine guns. Some of those on board jumped into the river to escape the firing and drowned. The gunfire continued for at least 30 minutes, and at least 16 bodies were later recovered from the river.

Indian authorities later claimed that "a shikara boat which was on its way from Lal Chowk to Lal Mandi carrying a large number of persons capsized in the river Jhelum." There was no official government investigation into the incident.

== The aftermath ==
In all, 59 homes, 190 small shops, 59 stores, two office buildings, five commercial buildings, two schools, and a shrine were destroyed in the blaze. An estimated 125 people were killed.
