= Human rights abuses in Jammu and Kashmir =

Human rights abuses in Jammu and Kashmir range from mass killings, enforced disappearances, torture, sexual violence to political repression and suppression of freedom of speech. The Indian Army, Central Reserve Police Force (CRPF), and Border Security Personnel (BSF) have been accused of committing severe human rights abuses against Kashmiri civilians. According to Seema Kazi, militant groups have also been held responsible for similar crimes, but the vast majority of abuses have been perpetrated by the armed forces of the Indian government.

A 2006 report by Human Rights Watch claimed that at least 20,000 civilians had been killed. The Indian government claims 14,000 civilians have died because of the insurgency against Indian rule as of March 2017, with most of these deaths having taken place in the 1990s and early 2000s. Pakistani officials say India has killed more than 100,000 Kashmiri civilians, of which 7,200 died from custodial torture. Moreover, they also claim 162,000 Kashmiris have been tortured.

India and Pakistan accuse each other of violating the ceasefire and targeting civilians at the Line of Control, the de facto border between Indian-administered Kashmir and Pakistan-administered Kashmir. India also accuses alleged state-sponsored militants from Pakistan of committing human rights violations against Kashmiri civilians. Leaked diplomatic cables revealed that the Red Cross had briefed US officials in Delhi in 2005 about the use of torture from 2002 to 2004 by security forces against hundreds of detainees suspected of being connected to or having information about militants.

In a 1993 report, Human Rights Watch stated that Indian security forces "assaulted civilians during search operations, tortured and summarily executed detainees in custody and murdered civilians in reprisal attacks"; according to the report, militants had also targeted civilians, but to a lesser extent than security forces. Rape was regularly used as a means to "punish and humiliate" communities. Scholar Seema Kazi says it is used as a weapon of war by the state against the population. A 2010 US state department report stated that the Indian army in Jammu and Kashmir had carried out extrajudicial killings of civilians and suspected insurgents. The report also described killings and abuse being carried out by insurgents. In 2010, statistics presented to the Indian government's Cabinet Committee on Security showed that for the first time since the 1980s, the number of civilian deaths attributed to the Indian forces was higher than those attributed to insurgents' actions. The Indian Army claims that 97% of the reports about the human rights abuse have been found to be "fake or motivated" based on the investigation performed by the Army. However, a report by the US State Department said, "Indian authorities use Armed Forces Special Powers Act (AFSPA) to avoid holding its security forces responsible for the deaths of civilians in Jammu and Kashmir."

Militant violence in the 1990s, led by the Jammu Kashmir Liberation Front against Kashmiri Hindu Pandits has led to the exodus of several hundred thousands of them out of the Kashmir Valley, who comprised an estimated ~5% of the valley's population before. According to Asia Watch, the militant organisations forced the Hindus residing in the Kashmir valley to flee and become refugees in Delhi and Jammu. The chief perpetrators were the Jammu & Kashmir Liberation Front and the Hizbul Mujahideen. Migration continued until a vast majority of the Kashmiri Pandits were evicted out of the valley after having suffered many acts of violence, including sexual assault on women, arson, torture and extortion of property. Some of the separatist leaders in Kashmir reject this, while others accept it. The Indian government is attempting to reinstate the displaced Pandits in Kashmir. According to the J & K government an amount of ₹71.95 crore was spent in providing relief and other facilities to the Kashmiri migrants living in Jammu and other parts in 2007–08, ₹70.33 crore in 2008-09 and ₹68.59 crore from 2009 up to January 2010. The remnants of Kashmiri Pandits have been living in Jammu, but most of them believe that, until the violence ceases, returning to Kashmir is not an option.

According to a 2022 report by Amnesty International, repression by Indian government has intensified in the region after the abrogation of article 370 in 2019. Amnesty recognized at least 60 instances of human rights violations. The internet was shut down for 18 months after the revocation of special status of the region. The information coming out of the region is totally controlled by the government, with regular internet shut downs and passing policies like 2020 Revised Media Policy and 2021 Film Policy, which restrict press freedom. Indian government shut down Kashmir Press Club which led to further decline in the media coverage and freedom in the region. At least six journalists, human rights activists, and academics were denied travelling abroad despite having all the required documents, restricting freedom of movement without a court warrant or a written explanation.

== Indian Armed Forces ==
Thousands of Kashmiris have been reported to be killed by Indian security forces in custody, extrajudicial executions and enforced disappearances and these human right violations are said to be carried out by Indian security forces under total impunity. Civilians including women and children have been killed in "reprisal" attacks by Indian security forces. International NGOs, as well as the US State Department, have documented human rights abuses including disappearances, torture, and arbitrary executions carried out during India's counter-terrorism operations.

United Nations has expressed serious concerns over large number of killings by Indian security forces. Human Rights groups have also accused the Indian security forces of using child soldiers, although the Indian government denies this allegation. (Note: The Indian Government claims that even though children can join the armed forces, they are not formally enrolled into regular service before the age of 18. [..]In Jammu and Kashmir, the Indian army has armed local Village Defence Committees (VDC) – primarily Hindus – in Doda, Udhampur and the border districts to assist security forces in anti-insurgency operations.(HRW, Behind the Kashmir Conflict: Abuses by Indian Security Forces and Militant Groups Continue, op. cit.; Bukhari, S., "Militants kill 19 in Jammu", The Hindu, 21 July 1999.)) So far more than 15,000 inhabitants, reportedly including teenagers, have joined these self-defence groups.
At the Asia-Pacific Conference on the Use of Children as Soldiers in May 2000 the representative of the state government of Jammu and Kashmir denied the involvement of children in VDCs. He acknowledged that there may have been some instances of young boys taking up arms to defend themselves under attack, but that there was "no policy to encourage young boys to become members of the Village Defence Committees." Torture, widely used by Indian security sources, whose severity is described as beyond comprehension by Amnesty International, has been responsible for the huge number of deaths in custody.

The Telegraph, citing a WikiLeaks report, quotes the International Committee of the Red Cross (ICRC) that Indian security forces were physically abusing detainees with beatings, electrocutions and sexual interference. These detainees weren't Islamic insurgents or Pakistani-backed insurgents but civilians, in contrast to India's continual allegations of Pakistani involvement. The detainees were "connected to or believed to have information about the insurgents". According to ICRC, 681 of the 1296 detainees whom it interviewed claimed torture. US officials have been quoted reporting "terrorism investigations and court cases tend to rely upon confessions, many of which are obtained under duress if not beatings, threats, or in some cases torture."

Amnesty International accused security forces of exploiting the Armed Forces Special Powers Act (AFSPA) that enables them to "hold prisoners without trial". The group argues that the law, which allows security to detain individuals for as many as two years "without presenting charges, violating prisoners' human rights". The Army sources maintain that "any move to revoke AFSPA in Jammu and Kashmir would be detrimental to the security of the Valley and would provide a boost to the terrorists."

Former Indian Army Chief General V. K. Singh rejected the accusations that the action was not taken in the cases of human rights violations by Army personnel. On 24 October 2010, he has said that 104 Army personnel had been punished in Jammu and Kashmir in this regard, including 39 officers. He also said that 95% of the allegations of human rights abuses against Indian Army were proved to be false, of which he remarked, had apparently been made with the "ulterior motive of maligning the armed forces". Going into details, he said: 'since 1994, 988 allegations against the Army personnel were received in Jammu and Kashmir. Out of these, 965 cases were investigated in which 940 were found to be untrue, accounting for 95.2%, leaving only 25 genuine allegations.' However, according to Human Rights Watch, the military courts in India, in general, were proved to be incompetent to deal with cases of serious human rights abuses and were responsible in covering up evidence and protecting the involved officers. Amnesty International in its report in 2015, titled "Denied"-Failures in Accountability in Jammu and Kashmir, says, "...with respect to investigations, an inquiry that is conducted by the same authority accused of the crime raises serious questions about the independence and impartiality of those proceedings", adding that according to the international law, an independent authority that is not involved in the alleged violations has to investigate such crimes.

In the later revelations on 24 September 2013 made by General V. K. Singh, he said that the state politicians of Jammu and Kashmir are funded by an Army secret service to keep the general public at calm and this activity is there since the partition.

=== Indian Army ===
The soldiers of the 4th Rajputana Rifles of the Indian Army on 23 February 1991 launched a search operation for the militants in a village Kunan Poshpora, in the Kupwara district of Jammu and Kashmir and after which they were accused by locals of allegedly raping 23 women. Later, interviews of victims and eyewitnesses were documented into a short film Ocean of Tears which was prevented from being broadcast. Nevertheless, the Indian committee that led a thorough investigation concluded that the allegations were "grossly exaggerated" and the Kunan rape story was "a massive hoax orchestrated by militant groups and their sympathisers and mentors in Kashmir and abroad as a part of sustained and cleverly contrived strategy of psychological warfare and as an entry point for re-inscribing Kashmir on the International Agenda as a Human rights issue." However, Human Rights organisations including Human Rights Watch have reported that the number of raped women could be as high as 100. The Indian Army has also harmed the health care system in the valley. Major hospitals in Kashmir have experienced crackdowns and army men have even entered the operation theatres in search of insurgents.

=== Border Security Force ===
On 22 October 1993, the 13th Battalion of the Border Security Forces was accused of arbitrarily firing on a crowd and killing 37 civilians in Bijbehara The number of reported dead and wounded vary by source. Amnesty International reported that at least 51 people died and 200 were wounded on that day.

The Indian government conducted two official enquiries and the National Human Rights Commission of India (NHRC) conducted a third. In March 1994 the government indicted the Border Security Force (BSF) for firing into the crowd "without provocation" and charged 13 BSF officers with murder. In another incident which took place at Handwara on 25 January 1990, 9 protesters were killed by the same unit.

=== Central Reserve Police Force ===
During the Amarnath land transfer controversy more than 40 unarmed protesters were killed by the personnel of Central Reserve Police Force. The same practice was again repeated by the personnel of the Central Reserve Police Force, during the 2010 Kashmir Unrest, which resulted in 112 deaths, including many teenager protesters at various incidents.

=== Special Operations Group ===
The Special Operations Group was raised in 1994 for counter-terrorism. A volunteer force, mainly comprising police officers and policemen from the Jammu and Kashmir Police. The group is accused of torture and custodial killings. A Senior Superintendent of this group and his deputy are among the 11 personnel, who were convicted for a fake encounter, which killed a local carpenter, and was labelled as a militant to get the promotions and rewards.

=== Armed Forces (Special Powers) Act, 1958 ===
In September 1990 the Armed Forces (Special Powers) Act was enacted in Jammu and Kashmir after passing in the Parliament of India to handle the rise in Kashmir Insurgency. Human rights group Amnesty claim that the special powers under (AFSPA) gives the security force immunity from alleged violations committed, and condemn it. United Nations High Commissioner for Human Rights Navanethem Pillay has urged India to repeal AFSPA and to investigate the disappearances in Kashmir.

=== Massacres ===
The Indian security forces are also accused of many massacres. Some of them include:

Gawakadal massacre: On 21 January 1990, at least 51 civilians were killed by CRPF troopers during protests against earlier raids in which wanton arrests and molestation of women were conducted by CRPF troops.

Handwara massacre: On 25 January 1990, two BSF patrolling parties in Handwara indiscriminately fired at peaceful protesters and killed 25 people. Many people were injured.

Zakoora and Tengpora massacre: Indian forces killed 47 protesters and injured hundreds on 1 March 1990 at Zakoora Crossing and Tengpora Bypass Road in Srinagar. The killers were not punished.

Hawal massacre: At the funeral of Mirwaiz Muhammad Farooq on 21 May 1990, over 60 civilians were killed by paramilitary forces and hundreds injured in the indiscriminate firing on the funeral procession.

Sopore massacre: On 6 January 1993, Indian troops killed 55 civilians in the town of Sopore and set fire to many homes and buildings.

Bijbehara Massacre: On 22 October 1993, the Indian Army killed 51 civilians during protests over the siege of the Hazratbal Mosque. 25 of those killed were students. None of the accused were punished.

Kupwara massacre: On 27 January 1994, the Indian Army fired at and killed 27 civilians, mainly traders, in Kupwara district. Survivors say that the soldiers carried out the massacre to punish people for observing shutdown on 26 January.

=== Fake encounters and killings ===
Hundreds of civilians including women and children have reportedly been extrajudicially executed by Indian security forces and the killings are concealed as fake encounters. Despite government denial, Indian security officials have reportedly confessed to Human Rights Watch of the widespread occurrence of fake encounters and its encouragement for awards and promotions According to a BBC interview with an anonymous security person, 'fake encounter' killings are those in which security personnel kill someone in cold blood while claiming that the casualty occurred in a gun battle. It also asserts that the security personnel are Kashmiris and "even surrendered militants".

In 2010 three men were reported missing proceeding these missing reports 3 men claimed to be militants were killed in a staged gun battle the army also claimed they had found Pakistani currency among the dead. The major was subsequently suspended and a senior soldier transferred from his post. In 2011, a Special Police Officer and an Indian Army Jawan were charged by the Kashmir police for murder of a civilian whom the duo had killed in an encounter claiming that he was a top Lashkar-e-Taiba militant.

=== Disappearances ===
Indian security forces have been implicated in many reports for enforced disappearances of thousands of Kashmiris whereas the security forces deny having their information and/or custody. This is often in association with torture or extrajudicial killing. The extent of male disappearances has been so large that a new term "half-widows" has been created for their wives who end up with no information of their husbands' whereabouts. Human right activists estimate the number of disappeared to be over eight thousand, last seen in government detention. The disappeared are believed to be dumped in thousands of mass graves across Kashmir.

==== Mass graves ====
Mass graves have been identified all over Kashmir by human right activists believed to contain bodies of thousands of Kashmiris of enforced disappearances. A State Human Rights Commission inquiry in 2011, has confirmed there are thousands of bullet-ridden bodies buried in unmarked graves in Jammu and Kashmir. Of the 2,730 bodies uncovered in 4 of the 14 districts, 574 bodies were identified as missing locals in contrast to the Indian governments insistence that all the graves belong to foreign militants According to deposition submitted by Parvez Imroz and his field workers in 2011, the total number of unmarked graves was more than 6,000.

=== Extrajudicial killings by security personnel ===
In a 1994 report, Human Rights Watch described summary executions of detainees as a "hallmark" of counter-insurgency operations by Indian security forces in Kashmir. The report further stated that such extrajudicial killings were often administered within hours of arrest, and were carried out not as aberrations but as a "matter of policy". In a 1995 report, Amnesty International stated that hundred of civilians had been victims of such killings, which were often claimed by officers as occurring during "encounters" or "cross-fire".

=== Torture ===
Indian security forces and police have been accused of the systematic use of torture. US officials first showed concern regarding the widespread use of torture in 2007 where they presented evidence to Indian diplomats.

In 2012, human rights lawyer Parvez Imroz and his field workers commenced the first statewide study of torture in Kashmir and his report concluded that torture in Kashmir is both endemic and systematic. The report suggests that one in six Kashmiris have faced torture. In Imroz's study sample of 50 villages, more than 2,000 extreme cases of torture were identified and documented, where he found that there were 50 centers run by the army and paramilitaries, where torture has been practised since 1989.

In 2023, armed forces entered the mosque in Zadoora, Jammu and Kashmir, and forced the villagers to chant pro-Hindu slogans. This event was condemned by various political leaders and was seen as assault on religious freedom.

=== Sexual violence ===
Although both security forces and militants are guilty of rape, according to scholar Seema Kazi and Jeffrey Kenney, rape by the former outstrips the latter in both scale and frequency. Rape is said to have been used as a weapon of war against the Kashmiri population. The frequent rape of Kashmiri Muslim women by Indian state security forces routinely goes unpunished. According to a report by Human Rights Watch in 1993, the security forces use rape as a method of retaliation against Kashmiri civilians during reprisal attacks after militant ambushes. Professor William Baker states that rape in Kashmir was not the result of a few undisciplined soldiers but an active strategy of the security forces to humiliate and intimidate the Kashmiri population. Human rights groups state that 150 top officers, of the rank of major or above, have participated in torture as well as sexual violence and that the Indian government was covering up such acts.

However, in 2013, Chief Minister Omar Abdullah reported to the Jammu & Kashmir Legislative Assembly that from 1989 to 2013 a total of 5,125 rapes and 14,953 molestations were registered, but only 579 convictions were secured (about 3.3%), yet most cases did not involve security personnel, as security forces were named in 70 rapes and 55 molestations while state police were implicated in 59 rapes and 34 molestations..

== Suicide and psychological problems ==
Kashmiri women are reportedly said to be highly prone to suicidal tendencies due to the conflict-situations. The fear, stress, tension, and uncertainty prevailing in the state are said to be the main reasons for this. According to a survey in 2012, 17,000 people, mostly women, have committed suicide during the past 20 years in the Valley. According to a study by the Medecins Sans Frontieres,

"Women in Kashmir have suffered enormously since the separatist struggle became violent in 1989–90. Like the women in other conflict zones, they have been raped, tortured, maimed, and killed. A few of them were even jailed for years together. Kashmiri women are among the worst sufferers of sexual violence in the world. Sexual violence has been routinely perpetrated on Kashmiri women, with 11.6% of respondents saying they were victims of sexual abuse".

Due to the impact of the conflict, a number of people in the valley suffer from various psychological problems like stress (normal or related to traumatic event), anxiety, mood, and post-traumatic disorders.

== International response ==
A 2010 US State Department report cited extrajudicial killings by security forces in areas of conflict such as Kashmir as a major human rights problem in India. The British parliament expressed its sadness and regret over the discovery of over 6,000 unmarked graves in Kashmir. Christof Heyns, a special rapporteur on extrajudicial executions, has warned India that "all of these draconian laws had no place in a functioning democracy and should be scrapped".

On 14 June 2018 for the first time ever UN human rights council released a report of 49 pages on human rights violations in Kashmir and accused both India and Pakistan on the issue. The report also urges to set up a COI to investigate the issue of human rights violations in Kashmir. Pakistan welcomed the step while India rejected, saying the report violates India's sovereignty. Further India says facts in the report are not authentic and misleading, use of term armed group instead of terrorist group and leaders instead of terrorists is not acceptable.

== Kashmiri militants ==
Reports from Amnesty International, Human Rights Watch and the International Commission of Jurists have confirmed Indian reports of systematic human rights violations by militants who claim Jammu and Kashmir to be a part of Pakistan. The Jammu Kashmir Liberation Front (JKLF) has also been blamed of carrying out human rights violations, ranging from kidnapping to ethnic cleansing of several hundred thousand Hindu Kashmiri Pandits. A 2010 US state department report blamed separatist insurgents in Kashmir and other parts of the country of committing several serious abuses, including the killing of security personnel as well as civilians, and of engaging in widespread torture, rape, beheadings, kidnapping, and extortions.

=== Exodus of Kashmiri Pandits ===
Kashmiri Pandits had been a favoured section of the population during Dogra rule (1846–1947). About 20 per cent of them had left the Kashmir valley by 1950 after the land reforms and they began to leave in much greater numbers in the 1990s. According to a number of authors, approximately 100,000 of the total Kashmiri Pandit population of 140,000 left the valley during that decade. Other authors have suggested a higher figure for the exodus, ranging from the entire population of over 150,000, to 190,000 of a total Pandit population of 200,000, to a number as high as 253,000. The US government has reported on the terrorist threat to Pandits still living in the Kashmir region.

The alleged rigging of the 1987 Assembly Elections by the ruling party, National Conference, saw the rise of an armed rebellion among Kashmiris associated with the Muslim United Front (MUF), a conglomerate of several Muslim political organisations opposed to National Conference. During the eruption of the armed rebellion, the insurgents are reported to have specifically targeted the Pandits, with torture and killings. Reports by Indian government state that 219 Kashmiri Pandits were killed from 1989 to 2004 and around 140,000 migrated due to militancy while over 3000 stayed in the valley The local organisation of Pandits in Kashmir, Kashmir Pandit Sangharsh Samiti after carrying out a survey in 2008 and 2009, claimed that 399 Kashmiri Pandits were killed by insurgents from 1990 to 2011 with 75% of them being killed during the first year of the Kashmiri insurgency. Motilal Bhat, the president of the Pandit Hindu Welfare Society, rejected the figure of 399 killed and said that only 219 were killed.

Kashmiri separatists believe that the then Governor Jagmohan encouraged the exodus of Kashmiri Pandits from the Valley by deliberately creating an atmosphere of paranoia. This, they claim, was done to "facilitate the counter-insurgency" operations and suppressing the anti-Indian uprising in Kashmir. The mass migration of Kashmiri Pandits from the Valley started on 19 January 1990 immediately preceding the first massacre of Kashmiri Muslims at Gawakadal. The Gawakadal massacre was followed by eight other major massacres and allegations of fake encounters, enforced disappearances, tortures and crackdown operations.. Pro-India commentators have refuted this version as a false allegation "to hide the truth".

Our people were killed. I saw a girl tortured with cigarette butts. Another man had his eyes pulled out and his body hung on a tree. The armed separatists used a chainsaw to cut our bodies into pieces. It wasn't just the killing but the way they tortured and killed.

— A crying old Kashmiri Hindu in refugee camps of Jammu told BBC news reporter

The violence against Kashmiri Pandits was condemned and labelled as ethnic cleansing in a 2006 resolution passed by the United States Congress. It stated that insurgents infiltrated the region in 1989 and began an ethnic cleansing campaign to convert Kashmir to a Muslim state. According to the same, the population of Kashmiri Pandits in Kashmir had declined from 400,000 in 1989 to 4,000 in 2011. Historian Mridu Rai says that such high numbers are not credible because the total Kashmiri Pandit population was only 160,000 to 170,000 at the time of their departure.

The CIA has reported nearly 506,000 people, about half of which are Pandit Hindus are displaced due to the insurgency. The United Nations Commission on Human Rights reports that there are roughly 1.5 million refugees from Indian-administered Kashmir, bulk of whom arrived in Pakistan administered Kashmir and in Pakistan after the situation on the Indian side worsened in 1989 insurgency.

Post-1989, Kashmiri Pandits and other minority groups in Jammu and Kashmir have been targets of jihadi elements which India alleges and blames on the Inter-Services Intelligence. The Kashmiri Pandits, a community of Hindu Brahmins, then comprising 5% of the population of the state were the primary targets of Islamic militants, who also sought to also eliminate Kashmir's record of 5000 years of Hindu Sanskrit culture and scholarship as well as the tolerant indigenous multiculturalism referred to as Kashmiriyat. As many as 170,000 Kashmiri Pandits are estimated to have fled the state due to being targeted and threatened by militant groups. In 1989, attacks on Pandits escalated and Muslim paramilitaries selectively raped, tortured and killed Kashmiri Pandits, burnt their temples, idols and holy books. The Pandits fled en masse from the state after which their houses were burnt by militants and their artwork and sculptures were destroyed.

In August 2000, militant groups killed 30 Hindu pilgrims in what became known as the 2000 Amarnath pilgrimage massacre. The Indian government blamed the Lashkar-e-Taiba for the killings. The BBC writes that "hundreds of Hindu labourers ha[d] been leaving the Kashmir Valley" in August 2000 due to targeted killings against Hindu workers.

Other minorities such as Kashmiri Sikhs were also targeted. According to Chitkara, the killing of Sikhs near Anantnag in 2001, by the Jehadis was aimed at ethnic cleansing. Hindus have migrated from most of the Kashmir valley, Sikhs who form a very small percentage could be forced to migrate in the wake of such killings. The Lashkar-e-Taiba has been blamed by Indian government for the Chittisinghpura massacre, which killed 36 Sikhs at the time of Clinton's visit to India. In 2010, the Lashkar-e-Taiba (LeT) associate David Headley, who was arrested in connection with the 2008 Mumbai attacks, confessed to the National Investigation Agency that the LeT carried out the Chittisinghpura massacre.

== See also ==
- Jaish-e-Mohammed
- Hizbul Mujahideen
- Lashkar-e-Taiba
- Human rights abuses in Azad Kashmir
- Pakistan and state-sponsored terrorism
- Human rights in India
- Papa II
- Women's rights in Jammu and Kashmir
