= 1990 Zakoora and Tengpora massacre =

- Location: Zakura, India; Tengpora, Srinagar
- Date: 1 March 1990
- Target: Civilians
- Attack type: Massacre, Mass shooting
- Deaths: 47 killed
- Injuries: 14–100 wounded
- Perpetrator: Indian Army

The Zakura And Tengpora Massacre was the killing of Kashmiri Muslim protesters calling for the implementation of a United Nations resolution regarding the plebiscite in Kashmir at Zakura Crossing and Tengpora Bypass Road in Srinagar on 1 March 1990, in which 26 people were killed at Zakura and 21 at Tengpora. 14 people were injured by Indian forces. It led Amnesty International to issue an appeal for urgent action on Kashmir.

== See also ==
- Gawakadal massacre
- Sopore massacre
- Handwara massacre
- Bijbehara massacre
- Human rights abuses in Jammu and Kashmir
