= 2018 Sunjuwan attack =

Terrorist attack in Jammu and Kashmir, India

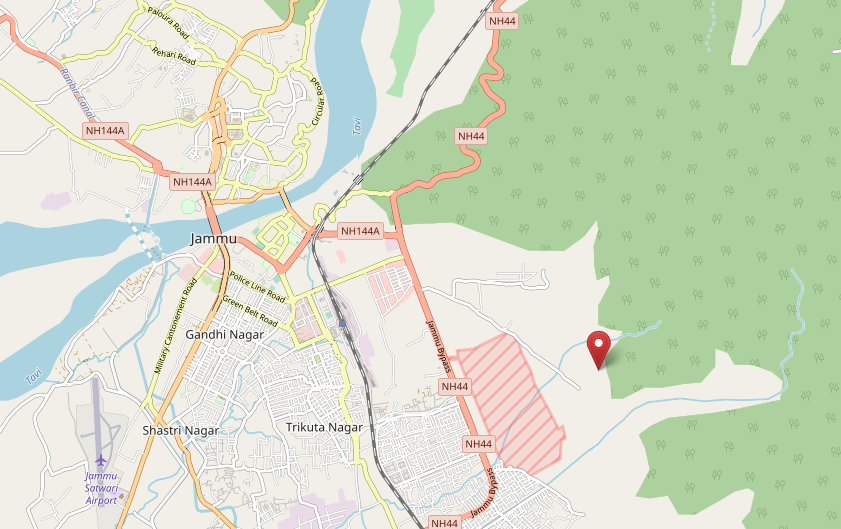
- Location of Sunjuwan in Jammu city
- Location: 32°42′5.0″N 74°55′19.2″E; Sunjuwan Military Station, Jammu, Jammu and Kashmir, India
- Date: 10 February 2018- 11 February 2018
- Deaths: 10 (6 soldiers, 1 civilian and 3 militants)
- Injuries: 11
- Perpetrator: Jaish-e-Mohammed

On 10 February 2018, at predawn, 3 Jaish-e-Mohammed terrorists attacked Sunjuwan Military Station, in the city of Jammu, in the Indian state of Jammu and Kashmir. Along with the attackers, 6 soldiers and 1 civilian were killed, while 20 were injured including 14 soldiers, and five women and children. Notably, this attack coincided with the anniversary of the death of Afzal Guru, convicted in the 2001 Indian parliament attack. The attack was described as one of the worst since the 2016 Uri attack.

The man described by the Indian Army as the mastermind of the attack, Mufti Waqas, a commander in Jaish-e-Mohammed, was killed in an army operation on 5 March 2018 in Awantipora.

== Attack ==
In the early hours of Saturday 10 February 2018, at around 4:10 am IST, three heavily armed militants infiltrated into the military station, which served as the HQ of 36th Brigade which housed army personnel as well as their families. The attackers were armed with AK-47 assault rifles and grenades. They entered the residential quarters and opened fire, killing four soldiers and injuring at least nine others including women and children.

The militants were cornered in a residential complex and special forces were deployed in a battle that lasted over 24 hours, at the end of which all the militants were killed. The army camp consisting of 150 buildings was cleared out. Subsequently, flushing operations were carried out to neutralise the remaining attackers.

Five soldiers, all serving in the 1st battalion, Jammu and Kashmir Light Infantry, were killed in the attack: Sub. Madan Lal Choudhary, Sub. Mohammad Ashraf Mir, Hav. Habibullah Qurashi, Nk. Manzoor Ahmed and L/Nk. Mohammad Iqbal. L/Nk. Mohammad Iqbal's father, a civilian, was also killed.

The dead attackers were identified as Kari Mushtaq, Mohammad Khalid Khan, and Mohammad Adil, all of whom were Pakistani nationals.

There were reports that some of the illegal Rohingya migrants living in Jammu might have provided logistical assistance to these terrorists.

== Aftermath ==
The attack happened at a distance of six kilometers from the University of Jammu. Schools in the region were shut and a high alert was sounded in the entire region following the attack. Anti-Pakistan slogans were raised in the Jammu and Kashmir Assembly following the attack. Local residents of Jammu chanted anti-Pakistan slogans.

The pregnant wife of a soldier, Rfn. Nazir Ahmed, was shot in the back during the attack. She was immediately taken to a military hospital and soon afterwards delivered her baby successfully.

Indian defense minister Nirmala Sitharaman visited the injured victims. She blamed Pakistan for the attack and said "Pakistan will pay" for the "misadventure". Pakistan responded the next day rejecting the allegations and accusing India of generating "war hysteria". The US Director of National Intelligence, Dan Coats, said in his testimony to Senate Select Committee, that Pakistan-supported terrorist groups would continue to carry out attacks in India. He added that Pakistan's perception of its "eroding position" relative to India in economic and domestic security spheres drove it towards goals counter to those of the United States.

Controversial Indian parliamentarian Asaduddin Owaisi highlighted the fact that five out of the seven killed in the attack were Kashmiri Muslims. The BJP replied to his statement as giving a "communal angle" to the sacrifices made by the Army. The Indian Army said that it was above religion and would not "communalise [the] martyrs".

Thousands of local residents gathered to mourn the deaths of the slain soldiers in their home towns of Kupwara, Reshipora in Tral, Kewa village in Anantnag. Army soldiers were also present to give a guard of honour.

== See also ==
- Insurgency in Jammu and Kashmir
- Pakistan and state-sponsored terrorism
