= Ocean of Tears =

- Directed by: Billal A Jan
- Produced by: Rajiv Mehrotra
- Release date: 2012
- Running time: 27 minutes
- Country: India
- Language: Kashmiri

Ocean of Tears is a 2012 short documentary film directed by Billal A Jan in Kashmiri produced by Rajiv Mehrota under the banner of Public Service Broadcasting Trust of India (PBST). The film is a documentary of the crimes and human rights violations imposed on the people of Kashmir, especially on women. The film covers the mass rape incident of Kunan Poshpora.

The film, supported by the Ministry of Information and Broadcasting, was banned from screening by the University of Kashmir and the Aligarh Muslim University on their respective campuses. Attempts were also made by the activists of the Rashtriya Swayamsevak Sangh (RSS) to block the film from being screened.

== Production ==
Bilal conceived of the idea of exploring the situation of the women of the region while filming an earlier documentary on child labour in Kashmir. The original proposal was for a much longer film, but it was later shortened on the advice of the PSBT. The film was shot over 10 days on location in the villages of Kunan Poshpora and Shopian. It took several negotiations with the villagers before they would consent to tell their stories on camera; at first only the men were willing, but after four visits the women agreed to be filmed. A team of four young women assisted in the filming.

The PSBT recommended that the 78 minutes originally planned for be cut to 26 minutes, so as to fall under the short film category, and requested that a disclaimer accompany the film. The Censorship certificate was then granted.

== Obstacles to screening ==
The film was banned from screening by the University of Kashmir and the Aligarh Muslim University on their respective campuses. It was reported in 2013 that the only screening of the film in India was at the film festival of the Federation of Film Societies of India. Outside India, it was screened at the Human Rights International Film Festival and the Al Jazeera film festival in Doha.

It was also reported that the activists of the Rashtriya Swayamsevak Sangh (RSS) attempted to block the screening of the film at a film festival in Thrissur in 2014, but the local police cleared the activists, allowing the screening to proceed.

== See also ==
- The Kashmir Files
- Rape during the Kashmir conflict
- Human rights abuses in Jammu and Kashmir
