= Zakura, India =

Zakura
- Zukura, Zukur
- Location in Jammu & Kashmir, India
- Coordinates: 34.1589887°N 74.8316992°E
- Country: India
- Union Territory: Jammu & Kashmir
- Division: Kashmir
- District: Srinagar
- Constituency: Hazratbal
- Settled: Ancient

Languages
  - Official: Kashmiri, Dogri, Urdu, Hindi, English
- Time zone: UTC+5:30 (IST)
- PIN: 190006
- Telephone code: 0194

Zakura, also known as Zukura and Zukur, is a notified area and town in the Srinagar district of the union territory of Jammu and Kashmir, India. The town is the integral part of Hazratbal constituency. The area is located about 12 km from commercial center of the Kashmir Valley. The area provides at least two major road links which connects municipal committee of Ganderbal with Srinagar.

== Geography ==
The area is located 34.1589887°N 74.8316992°E 12 km towards North from the commercial center of Srinagar.

== History ==
The people living in Zakura witnessed the slaughter of the human lives by Indian armed forces in the 20th century. The key event among all the brutal killings was Zakura Massacre. The Massacre was the killing of protesters calling for the implementation of a United Nations resolution regarding a plebiscite in Kashmir at Zakura Crossing in Srinagar on 1 March 1990. 40 people died in the incident.

== Demographics ==
The postal code of the area is 190006. Kashmiri is the native language of the area, people also speak Urdu and English fluently.

== Education ==
=== Institute of Asian Medical Sciences ===
The college is considered one of the top medical colleges in valley. It provided major role and contribution in 2014 Kashmir floods, it was the only college in which vaccine injections were not destroyed by floods. It saved the life of many human beings.

== See also ==
- Buchpora
