= Shabir Choudhry =

Dr. Shabir Choudhry
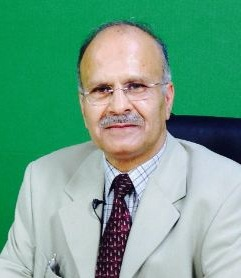
- Born: Azad Kashmir, Pakistan
- Citizenship: United Kingdom, Pakistan
- Known for: Founder and former secretary general and president of Jammu Kashmir Liberation Front; Founder of Kashmir Youth Movement; Writer

Shabir Choudhry is a British national and a Kashmiri leader, rights and peace activist, politician, academician and writer. He helped form the Kashmir Youth Movement in 1973, the Jammu and Kashmir Liberation Front in 1976 and later on the Kashmir National Party in 2008. He resigned from each of these after being discouraged or opposed to the direction they were headed. He went to United Kingdom in 1966 where he continues his struggle against forces of occupation, terrorism, extremism and religious intolerance in Azad Kashmir and Kashmir through regular statements, articles, press releases, conference and videos. He is a British national as well as a Pakistani/Kashmiri national.

== Political Life ==
- Founder member of JKLF Jammu Kashmir Liberation Front
- Spokesman Kashmir National Party and Director Diplomatic Committee
- Chairman South Asia Watch
- Founder member and Director Institute of Kashmir Affairs
- Regularly takes part in the Sessions of the UN Human Rights Commission in Geneva
- Has addressed seminars and conferences in the British Parliament, European Parliament and other important capitals of the world on issue of Kashmir, violence and terrorism
- Addressed at Cambridge University as a Chief Guest in a conference on Kashmir in 1990.

== Controversy ==
In 2015, Choudhry applied for renewal of his overseas Pakistani ID card in London. His application was blocked by NADRA after Pakistan's Inter Services Intelligence (ISI) accused him of "anti-state activities" sponsored by India's foreign intelligence agency. The Asian Human Rights Commission (AHRC) came out in support of Shabir Choudhry during this controversy. Shabir Choudhry challenged the authorities in Islamabad High Court to prove allegations made against him. After two and half years long trial the authorities, including ISI could not provide any evidence to support their contentions. The High Court ordered the authorities to renew his Identity card. Dr Shabir Choudhry proved to be an innocent person.

== Publications ==
=== English ===
- Kashmir Dispute: A Kashmiri perspective - Kashmiri struggle transformed in to Jihad, terrorism and a proxy war
- Tribal Invasion and Kashmir: Pakistani Attempts to Capture Kashmir in 1947, Division of Kashmir and Terrorism
- Terrorism, Kashmir Dispute and Possible Solutions: Rise of Jihadi Culture, Extremism and the Peace Process
- Kashmir and the Partition of India
- Kashmir Dispute and Peace in South Asia
- Azad Kashmir and Gilgit Baltistan
- Are Kashmiris Part of the Kashmir Dispute?
- Liberation Struggle, Jihad or a Proxy War: Nature of struggle in former Princely State of Jammu and Kashmir
- Kashmir Dispute: New Dimensions and New Challenges: Emerging Threats of Religious Intolerance, Terrorism, Regionalism and Outside Interference

=== Urdu ===
- Fareena
- Bay-Khataa - about the problems of Asian youths living in UK published in 1983.
- Pakistan and Kashmiri struggle for independence
- Is an independent Kashmir a conspiracy?

== See also ==
- Kashmir Conflict
- Hashim Qureshi
