= 1993 Sopore massacre =

1993 killing of civilians in Kashmir, India

1993 Sopore Massacre
- Part of Human rights abuses in Jammu and Kashmir
- Location: Sopore, Jammu and Kashmir, India
- Date: January 6, 1993; 33 years ago
- Target: Civilians
- Attack type: Massacre, Incendiary, Arson, Mass shooting
- Deaths: 43–57
- Injuries: 20–80 wounded
- Perpetrator: Border Security Force

The Sopore massacre refers to the mass killing of at least 43 Kashmiri civilians by Indian Border Security Force (BSF) who were travelling on a bus from Bandipur to Sopore in Kashmir on 6 January 1993. According to some reports as many as 57 people were killed.

== Background ==
Sopore is a major town in Kashmir within the Baramulla district, located 50 km (31 mi) north-west from Srinagar. On the morning of 6 January 1993, a group of 7–8 armed JKLF militants attacked a platoon of Border Security Force soldiers at Baba Yousuf Lane near Sopore and killed at least one soldier.

== Firing ==
On this bloody Wednesday, some shopkeepers were not allowed to come out and they were burned alive inside shops. In all, official Indian Government reports state that 250 shops and 50 homes were burned down although other sources claim as many as 450 buildings were burned down by the border security force. The Independent reported:

The Border Security Forces sprayed a public coach with machine-gun fire, killing the driver and more than 15 passengers, said witnesses. Three other cars were also fired on, and then the paramilitary forces set the vehicles ablaze. Next, they began herding the native Kashmiris into shops and houses, said witnesses. Then the security forces shot them, splashed paraffin over the bodies and set the buildings alight.

== Response ==
The Indian government claimed that the high casualties were the result of an intense gun battle between the BSF soldiers and militants in which an explosives cache belonging to the militants exploded and spread the fire to nearby buildings. However, the government later initiated a judicial inquiry into the matter and suspended several BSF officers due to the publicity the incident had generated. The day after the massacre, thousands of Kashmiris, defying a government-imposed curfew, protested against the actions of the BSF soldiers on the streets of Sopore.

Then-Prime Minister Narasimha Rao ordered State Governor Girish Saxena to visit Sopore and announced a compensation of ₹100,000 (US$1,000) for the relatives of the deceased. However, Muslim leaders, left-wing politicians and human rights organizations criticized Saxena for failing to stop human rights violations by the security forces in Kashmir and demanded a parliamentary delegation be sent to assess the destruction.

== See also ==
- Bijbehara massacre
- Kupwara massacre
- Zakoora and Tengpora massacre
- Gawkadal massacre
- Hawal massacre
