= Mehjoor Nagar Sikh massacre =

Terrorist incident in Kashmir, India

- Location: Mehjoor Nagar, Srinagar district, Jammu and Kashmir, India
- Date: 3 February 2001
- Target: Sikhs
- Attack type: Mass murder, spree shooting
- Deaths: 6
- Injuries: 5
- Perpetrators: Lashkar-e-Taiba, Hizbul Mujahideen.

The Mehjoor Nagar Sikh massacre refers to the fatal shooting of Sikhs on 3 February 2001 in the Srinagar district of Jammu and Kashmir, India. In this attack, at least six people were killed in a drive-by shooting and five were injured. The Mehjoor Nagar attack was the second big attack on the Sikh community of Kashmir – in March 2000, unknown gunmen committed a mass massacre of 35 Sikhs in Chithi Singh Pora.

== The killings ==
According to reports, this incident was triggered by the killing of an auto-rickshaw driver identified as Bilal Ahmed Khan of Gonikhan locality. Residents of Gonikhan alleged that two Sikh members of the special operations group (SOG) of the Jammu and Kashmir police boarded Bilal's auto-rickshaw the previous Wednesday. His body was later recovered from his auto near the bypass. The killing had triggered massive protest in Srinagar.

The names of the six dead in this case are Satnam Singh, Charanjeet Singh, Gurmeet Singh, Suraj Singh, Sumeet Pal Singh and Balwant Singh and the five injured are Kanwal Nain Singh, Satinder Kaur, Vikram Singh, Chand Kaur and Dharmender Singh

All Parties Sikh Coordination Committee has alleged that the "Government failed to book the ‘killers’ involved in Chattisinghpora and Mehjoor Nagar massacres".

== Aftermath ==
After the killings, several political and religious parties condemned the brutal killing. No arrests have been made in this case.
