= Child soldiers in India =

Child soldiers in India is a common occurrence among non-state forces such as insurgent organizations and up to seventeen militant factions use child soldiers in the Kashmir region. According to a report from the Conflict Study Center, child soldiers are used in Assam, Manipur, Nagaland, Andhra Pradesh, Chhattisgarh, Jharkhand, Karnataka, Maharashtra and Jammu and Kashmir; and that children were used by both state backed and anti-state insurgent groups. Use of children below the age of 18 in active conflict is a violation of the Indian Penal Code, the Geneva convention and the Convention on the Rights of the Child.

== Chhattisgarh ==
In Chhattisgarh, it is estimated that up to 80,000 children are involved in the ongoing Naxalite insurgency. The majority of children are used by militants, though government supported self-defence militias also use them. The Asian Legal Resource Centre has stated that human rights groups have voiced concerns over the use of child soldiers by the state and the Naxalites. According to them, up to 118 districts in India are facing armed insurrection and that child soldiers were used by both sides in these conflicts. Human rights watch has also accused the Indian security forces of using children as spies and messengers, although the Indian government denies this allegation. The Coalition to Stop the Use of Child Soldiers report in 2008 stated that there was recruitment of children by banned maoist militant group and terrorist groups operating in Jammu and Kashmir and north eastern states of India. although the majority of child soldiers were used by militants.
