= United Kashmir People's National Party =

Kashmiri political party

- Abbreviation: UKPNP
- Leader: Shaukat Ali Kashmiri
- General Secretary: Ishtiaq Hussain Khan
- Spokesperson: Nasir Aziz Khan
- Founded: April 10, 1985
- Ideology: Kashmiri nationalism Separatism; Socialism

Party flag
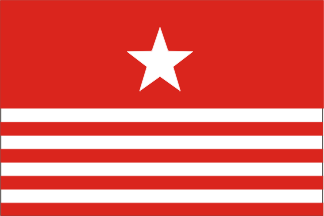

Website
- http://www.ukpnp.info

United Kashmir People's National Party (UKPNP) is a political party that advocates for an independent, united, and socialist Kashmir.

== Ideology ==
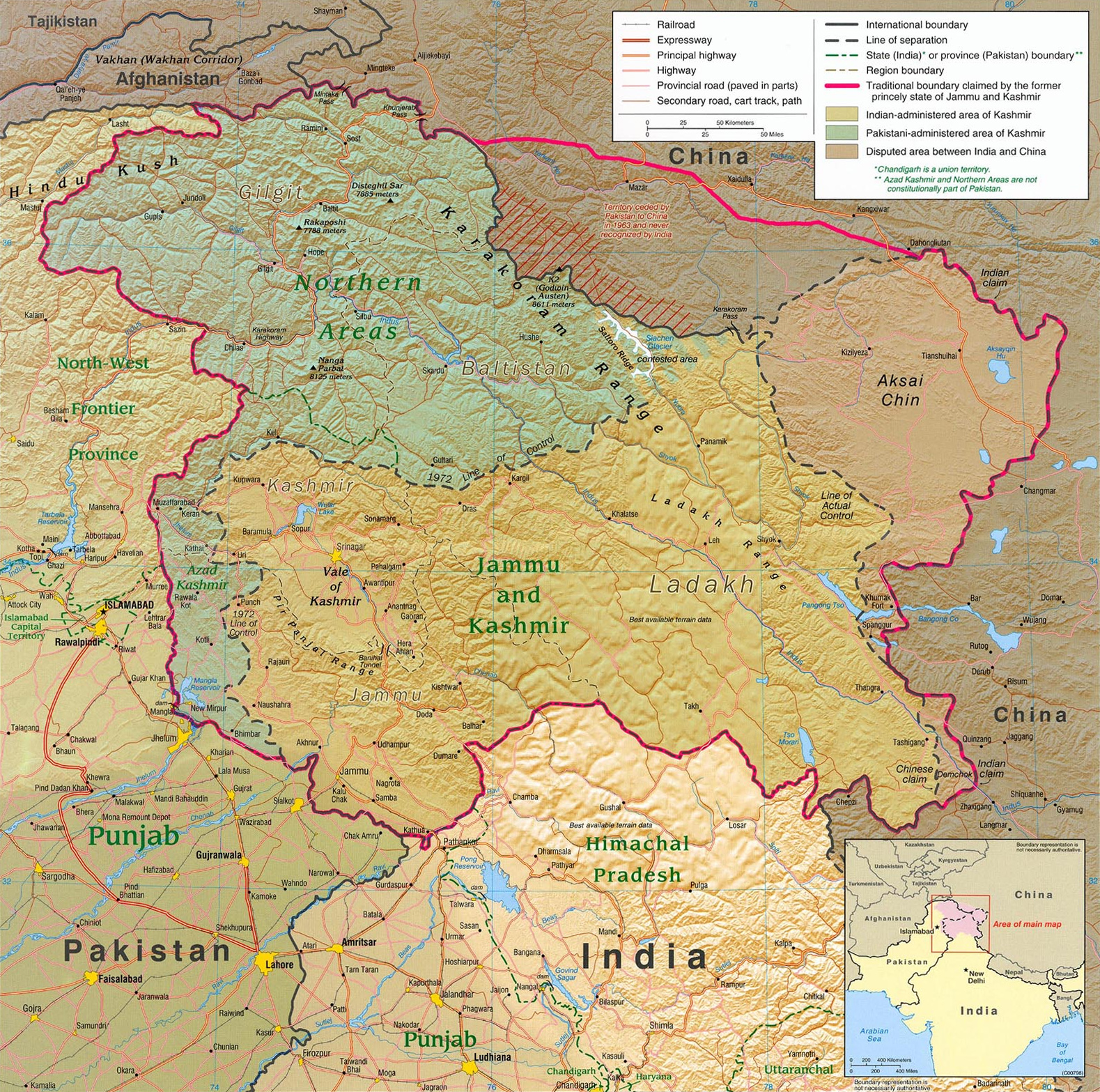
Kashmir region 2004

The party envisions Kashmir as the United States of Kashmir, comprising former states of Burushal, Dardistan, Boloristan, Ladakh, Purig, Kishtwar, Duggart, Poonch, and Kashmir Valley. The party aims to achieve this through a national democratic, non-violent revolution.

== History ==
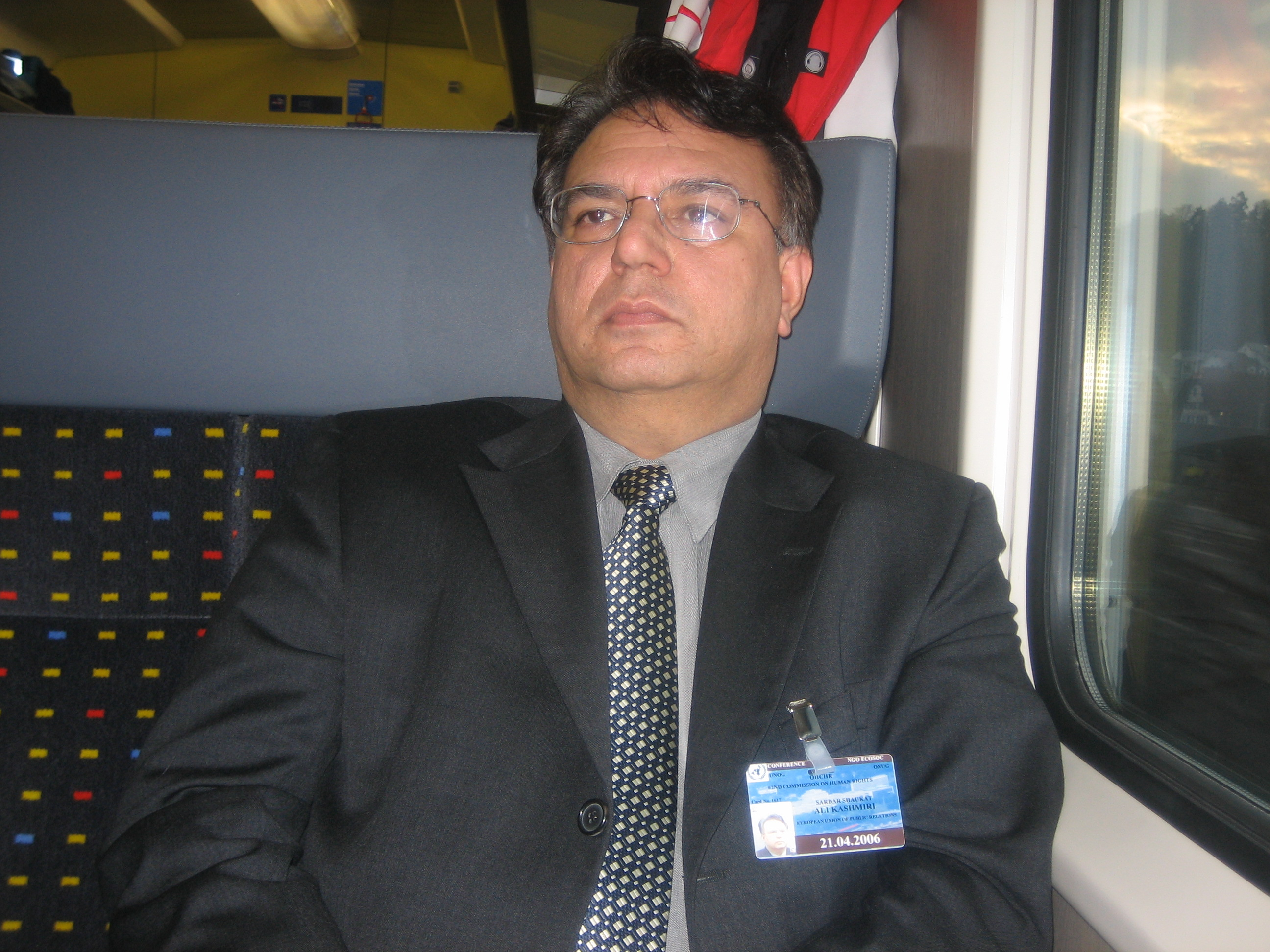
Sardar Shaukat Ali Kashmiri

The UKPNP was established on 10 April 1985 and is currently led by Sardar Shaukat Ali Kashmiri as chairman.

In May 2017, the United Kashmir People's National Party (UKPNP) held a conference in Brussels to discuss the political situation in the region. During the conference, the party released a statement that aimed to highlight the efforts of the Pakistani administration to convert Gilgit Baltistan into the fifth province of Pakistan. The statement was aimed at exposing what the party saw as a move to undermine the autonomy of the region and impose external control.

In a recent statement, the party criticized the government of Pakistan for its non-serious attitude towards Kashmir and described it as a "non-serious child" which is becoming weaker by the day. The party has called for a more proactive approach towards resolving the Kashmir issue and has urged the international community to play a more active role in facilitating dialogue between India and Pakistan.

== See also ==
- Kashmir conflict
