= 1990 Gawkadal massacre =

1990 mass killing of Kashmiri protesters

Gawkadal massacre
- Part of Human rights abuses in Jammu and Kashmir
- Location: 34.0748°N 74.8092°E; Gawkadal, Srinagar, Jammu and Kashmir, India
- Date: 21 January 1990; 36 years ago
- Target: Kashmiri Muslims
- Attack type: Massacre, Mass shooting
- Deaths: 50+
- Perpetrator: (India) Central Reserve Police Force

The Gawkadal massacre, named after the Gawkadal bridge in Srinagar, Jammu and Kashmir, India, where, on 21 January 1990, the Indian paramilitary troops of the Central Reserve Police Force opened fire on a group of Kashmiri Muslim protesters. At least 50 people died, some from being shot and others from drowning. The incident occurred two days after the state went under Governor's Rule, with Jagmohan appointed as the Governor for a second time in the Union government's bid to control mass protests by Kashmiris.

== Background ==
January 1990 was a major turning point for the one-and-a-half year old Kashmir insurgency, having been launched by the Pakistan-based Jammu Kashmir Liberation Front (JKLF) in July 1988 under Pakistani sponsorship. However, the pro-Independence JKLF was not in Pakistan's interest. By October 1989, its secret service ISI, working with the Jamaat-e-Islami Azad Kashmir, brought together some of the key Islamist insurgent groups working in Kashmir under the banner of Hizbul Mujahideen. In a key meeting in Kathmandu on 14 January 1990, Jamaat-e-Islami Kashmir was persuaded to take control of Hizbul Mujahideen. Henceforth, the Kashmir insurgency was to run along an Islamist paradigm. An often-heard slogan was "Azadi ka matlab kya, La Ilahi lilillah [illallah]" ("What is the meaning of freedom? It is Islamic State"). (Note: The slogan itself was an adaptation of that of the Pakistan movement from the 1940s: Pakistan ka matlab kya, La Ilahi illallah.)

Concurrent to these developments, the Indian central government was going through a crisis. Rajiv Gandhi lost the general election held in 1989, and a minority government led by opposition Janata Dal under V. P. Singh took power, with external support from the Bharatiya Janata Party (BJP). Singh appointed a Kashmiri politician Mufti Muhammad Sayeed as the Union home minister. A week later, on 8 December 1989, the JKLF kidnapped his daughter, Rubaiya Sayeed, demanding the release of jailed JKLF militants in return for her release. The government's capitulation to this demand strengthened JKLF and its "azadi" ("freedom") movement, while at the same time undercutting the authority of the state government led by Farooq Abdullah.

Following these events, the Indian government decided to replace Governor K. V. Krishna Rao. Under the pressure of BJP, the V. P. Singh government chose Jagmohan to succeed him. Jagmohan had served a previous term as the Governor in the State, during which the chief minister Farooq Abdullah was dismissed. Abdullah had held it against Jagmohan, and resigned from chief ministership ahead of the appointment. The state went under Governor's rule (the imposition of direct Union government rule). (Note: Farooq Abdullah is said to have resigned on "the midnight of the 18th" (Joshi 1999, p. 39). Jagmohan was sworn in as the Governor on the evening of the 19th (Joshi 1999, p. 39), which left almost an entire day when the state was run by only officials. Due to weather conditions, Jagmohan was only able to reach Srinagar early on the morning of the 21st to take stock of the situation and issue pertinent orders.)

Journalist Arif Jamal states that, once Jamaat-e-Islami decided to take over the leadership of the insurgency, it moved into decisive action, activating "a decade of planning".

== Events ==
=== 19 January ===
From the night of 19 January 1990 through the early morning hours of 20 January, Jammu and Kashmir Police and CRPF conducted house-to-house searches in Guru Bazar and Chotta Bazaar, a congested locality in downtown Srinagar, aiming to find illegal weapons or evidence of support for militants. Some 300 people are said to have been arrested, most of whom were later released. The daily Alsafa News quoted locals alleging that security forces had molested women under the guise of search operations. Both Jagmohan and Abdullah deny any involvement in the decision to carry out the raid. According to Manoj Joshi, the search was ordered by the police chiefs.

The events saw the initiation of a mass revolt in the Kashmir Valley. Various reports indicate that Kashmiri Muslims were out on the streets shouting anti-India, pro-Pakistan and Islamic slogans. Mosques crackled with loudspeakers in the middle of the night, issuing slogans and playing pre-recorded messages. India Today described the mood in the Valley as one of open defiance: "mobs challenged the gun, defying policemen to fire at them". They chanted slogans "Indian dogs go back" and "Azadi ka matlab kya, La Ilahi lilillah [illallah]" ("What is the meaning of freedom? It is Islamic State").

=== 20 January ===
As word of the raids spread on 20 January 1990, crowds gathered outside the Divisional Commissioner's office in Srinagar to protest the 'atrocities', and were tear-gassed. Organisers fanned out through the city and massive processions were initiated by the evening. A curfew was imposed by nightfall.

=== 21 January ===
On 21 January 1990, as reports of arrests and alleged molestation in the Chotta Bazaar locality spread across Srinagar, thousands of people gathered to protest. Processions marched through various parts of the city, heading toward Chotta Bazaar. When the unarmed crowd reached the Gawkadal bridge, they were fired upon by the CRPF, resulting in the deaths of around 50 people and injuries to dozens of others.

According to the Jammu and Kashmir security forces, upon approaching the wooden bridge a large crowd of demonstrators allegedly started pelting stones, after which the security forces fired on the crowd, leading to the death of several protestors. The police record mentions that "on January 21, a big crowd raising anti-India slogans was heading towards Lal Chowk and the security forces tried to stop the crowd near Gawkadal. Instead of dispersing, the unruly crowd started pelting stones at government buildings and security force personnel. The report ends without mentioning anything about the massacre that became the turning point of militancy in Kashmir."

Indian authorities initially put the official death toll for the massacre initially at between 21 and 28. Certain international human rights organisations and scholars, however, estimated that at least 50. Journalist Tavleen Singh stated that over 100 protesters were killed. Youth Forum for Kashmir put the number of fatalities as 55.

== Aftermath ==
In the aftermath of the massacre, more demonstrations followed, and in January 1990, Indian paramilitary forces are believed to have killed around 300 protesters in total. Human Rights Watch reported in May 1991 that, "In the weeks that followed the Gawkadal massacre as security forces fired on crowds of marchers and as militants intensified their attacks against the police and those suspected of aiding them, Kashmir's civil war began in earnest." MJ Akbar, editor of the Asian Age newspaper, said, "January 19 became the catalyst which propelled into a mass upsurge. Young men from hundreds of homes crossed over into Pakistan administered Kashmir to receive arms and training in insurrection Pakistan came out in open support of secession, and for the first time, did not need to involve its regular troops in the confrontation. In Srinagar, each mosque became a citadel of fervor."

No known actions were taken against the CRPF forces officials responsible for the massacre, or against the officers present at Gawkadal that night. No government investigation was ordered into the incident. Fifteen years later, the police case was closed and those involved in the massacre were never held accountable.

== See also ==
- Zakoora and Tengpora massacre
- Sopore massacre
- Handwara massacre
- Bijbehara massacre
- Human rights abuses in Jammu and Kashmir
