= 1993 Bijbehara massacre =

Incident involving Hazratbal shrine siege

- Part of Human rights abuses in Jammu and Kashmir
- Location: Bijbehara, Jammu and Kashmir, India
- Date: 22 October 1993
- Target: Civilians, Protestors
- Attack type: Massacre, Mass shooting
- Deaths: 51 killed (per Amnesty International); 35 killed (per United Nations High Commissioner for Refugees); 37 killed (per The Times of India)
- Injuries: 200 wounded (per Amnesty International); 76 wounded (per United Nations High Commissioner for Refugees)
- Perpetrator: Border Security Force
- Convicted: 13 BSF officers

The Bijbehara Massacre took place when 74th Battalion Border Security Force (BSF) fired upon Kashmiri Muslim protesters in the Anantnag district of Jammu and Kashmir, India on 22 October 1993, killing 51 civilians. In the official version of events, BSF had only acted in self-defense when fired upon by militants; however, this narrative was rejected by Human Rights Watch citing the 1993 U.S. Department of State country report on human rights in India which said, "Despite government claims that the security forces were ambushed by militants, only one BSF sub inspector was injured."

The protests had erupted over the siege of the mosque in Hazratbal. The number of reported dead and wounded vary by source. Amnesty International reported that at least 51 people died and 200 were wounded on that day, which included incidents in Srinagar and Bijbehara. The UN Refugee Agency reported 35 dead and about 76 wounded, citing news reports in The Times. The Times of India reported 37 dead.

The Indian government conducted two official enquiries and the National Human Rights Commission of India (NHRC) conducted a third. In March 1994 the government indicted the Border Security Force (BSF) for firing into the crowd "without provocation" and charged 13 BSF officers with murder. A nonpublic General Security Force Court trial conducted in 1996 led to their acquittal.

When the NHRC sought to examine the transcripts of the trials in order to satisfy itself that the BSF had made a genuine attempt to secure convictions, the Vajpayee government refused. The NHRC then moved the Supreme Court for a review. Faced with the Government's non-cooperation, the NHRC finally dismissed the case.

On 10 September 2007, the Jammu and Kashmir High Court ordered the state government to pay restitution to the victims' families.

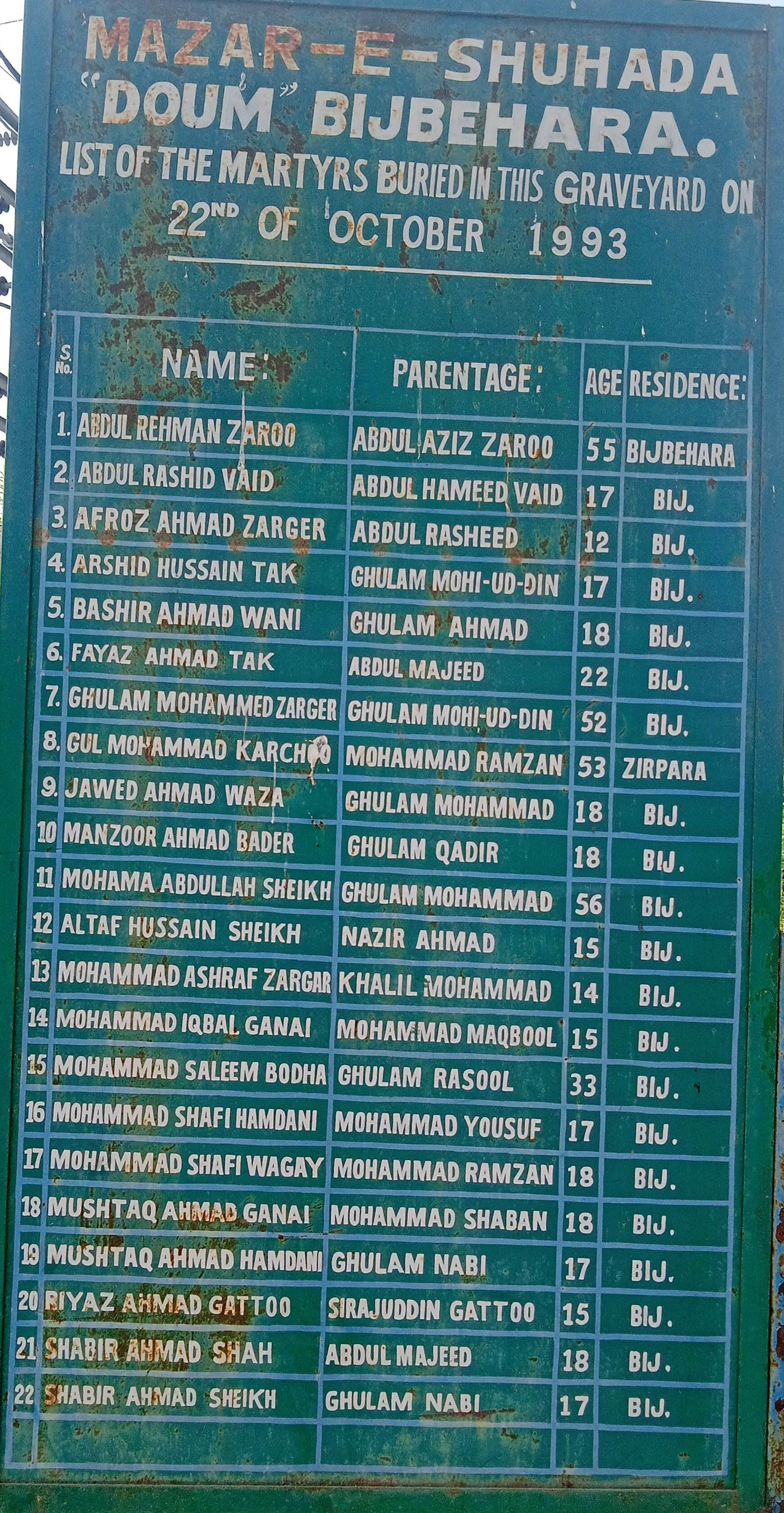
List of the Martyrs of Bijbehara town buried in Mazar-e-Shuhada, Bijbehara, on 22 October 1993. Out of 22 Martyrs, 16 are below 20 years of age.

== Background ==
In October, 1993, the Indian army stated they surrounded the Hazratbal Shrine after they were reported that armed rebels had occupied the shrine complex and had changed the locks. For the preceding three years, insurgents in the Kashmir Valley had waged a rebellion against Indian rule. The Indian Army's siege of the holiest Muslim shrine in the Kashmir Valley reignited anger at India. As the mosque crisis deepened, there were sporadic public demonstrations. Indian authorities imposed a curfew and positioned hundreds of troopers along the town's main streets.

== The shooting incident ==
On 22 October 1993, the eighth day of the siege, around 10,000 to 15,000 protesters gathered in the courtyard of the Jamia Masjid of Bijbehara after finishing Friday prayers. The protesters marched through the streets shouting pro-independence slogans, demanding an end to the Hazratbal siege and demonstrating against an earlier incident of firing on protesters near the Hazratbal shrine .

When the procession reached the main road (the Srinagar–Jammu National Highway), that divides the town, they were confronted by a large contingent of the BSF. As the procession reached the top of the road in the Gooriwan area of bijbehara, the BSF allegedly blocked the street and started firing indiscriminately, killing at least 48 people on the spot and injuring more than 200 others. The firing continued for nearly ten minutes. Human Rights Watch reported an eyewitness to the incident recalled: "The people had gathered on the National Highway which passes through Beijbehara town. It was like this even then, narrow, with shops on both sides of the road. There were thousands of people shouting slogans. But it was peaceful.... The BSF just opened fire without any warning. It was terrible. There were so many people lying on the ground. Others were running in panic.... This road, this very road, was full of blood."

== Media blackout ==
The Indian government was accused of a media blackout in Kashmir. A local news outlet, Kashmir Affairs, reported that soon after news of the massacre went out, the Indian government barred independent local and international media from entering the town. On 23 October 1993, when a large number of local and foreign media people converged on the town, the army used violence and fired into the air to stop them from visiting the old side of the town, Kashmir Affairs also reported.

== Human Rights Act ==
The Bijbehara massacre followed the September 1993 passage of the Human Rights Act by the Indian Parliament, adopted under the pressure of persistent allegations of human rights abuses in Jammu and Kashmir, as well as in other areas of armed conflict in India. The law established the NHRC, which began operations in October 1993 and promptly took up the Bijbehara massacre. However, it soon became apparent that the Commission would not be able to challenge the armed forces' effective immunity from prosecution under Indian law.

== Enquiry Commission indicts BSF ==
The government of India ordered a magisterial inquiry into the killings and withdrew the BSF unit stationed in Bijbehara. Director General Prakash Singh, at the time the BSF Director General, ordered a commissioner to investigate the massacre. The local media, including KashmirWatch.com, reported that Kashmiris saw such inquiries as escapism, an 'eyewash'. Numerous enquiries in the past did not produce results that pleased local people.

The Enquiry Magistrate's report was submitted to the government on 13 November 1993. It concluded that "firing upon the procession was absolutely unprovoked and the claim made by the security forces that they were forced to retaliate against the firing of militants for self-defence is baseless and concocted". The Enquiry Magistrate's report further stated that "The security personnel have committed [the] offence out of vengeance and their barbarous act was deliberate and well planned". The report indicted the Deputy Commandant of the BSF, JK Radola, for "tacit approval given by him to the indiscriminate and un-provoked firing".

The report recommended "the immediate dismissal of the accused persons who committed this dastardly act". It further recommended that "this should be further followed up with the initiation of criminal proceedings against them and every effort should be made to ensure that justice is done and [the] maximum possible punishment under the law of the land is awarded to such malignant and sick minded individuals."

== Recommendations by National Human Rights Commission ==
On 1 November 1993, the Commission, called for reports on the incident from the Defence and Home affairs ministries and the Government of J&K.

The Ministry of Defence denied that the army was involved. The Minister for Home Affairs sent a report to the commission based on the Magisterial Inquiry. The commission asked for copies of the testimony given by six witnesses. On 17 January 1994, the commission concluded "...that disciplinary proceedings had been initiated under the Border Security Force Act against 14 members of the Force, and further that, on the basis of a Magisterial Inquiry, steps may be initiated to launch prosecutions...". The commission also recommended that "immediate interim compensation" be paid to the victims' families and "a thorough review should be undertaken by government of the circumstances and conditions in which Units of the Border Security Force are deployed and expected to operate in situations involving only civilian population[s]".

== Acquittals ==
By 1996, the General Security Force Court had conducted a nonpublic trial which acquitted the accused men. The NHRC attempted to review the court files, but was refused access.

On 12 November 1996, three years after the NHRC issued its recommendations, A.K. Tandon, then director general of the BSF, told the NHRC that "a General Security Force Court trial was conducted in respect of the twelve BSF personnel involved in the said incident," but that results of the trial were "being withheld for the time being". The BSF had initially claimed that it had taken action against the responsible officials, but the only information available about this concerns one sub-inspector, who had been found not guilty.

On 16 March 1998, the NHRC, while acknowledging the BSF report, said that it wanted to review the proceedings of the General Security Force Court before taking any final position in the matter. The NHRC has the right to examine transcripts of trials to ensure that genuine attempts have been made to secure convictions. The Ministry of Home Affairs refused to supply the trial records, stating in a letter on 5 May 1998, the "inability of the government of India to show records of the GSFC to any authority other than those provided under the Border Security Force Act".

The NHRC subsequently tried several times to examine the proceedings of the trial. In its annual report in 1998–99, the NHRC noted that it was "deeply disturbed":

"The Commission is yet to satisfy itself that justice has fully been done in regard to the tragic loss of life that occurred in Bijbehara, in respect of which incident it had made specific recommendations. The Commission is determined to see this case through to its logical conclusion. At the end of the year, it was awaiting the records of those proceedings and was contemplating moving a Writ Petition before the Supreme Court if it were denied full access to the records that it had sought".

On 8 February 1999, the NHRC told the government to preserve all related documents and then appealed to the Supreme Court "to issue a writ to make available to the petitioner the relevant records of the courts martial conducted in respect of the armed forces personnel involved in the said incident". The writ petition was later withdrawn by the NHRC, observers said this was probably because the verdict would have gone against the commission due to the restrictions imposed under Section 19 of the Human Rights Protection Act, 1993.

== See also ==
- List of Massacres in Jammu and Kashmir
- Gawakadal Massacre, 1990
- Zakoora And Tengpora Massacre, 1990
- Sopore massacre
- Handwara massacre
