= 1990 Handwara massacre =

Death of protestors in Kashmir in India

Handwara massacre
- Part of Human rights abuses in Jammu and Kashmir
- Location: Handwara, Jammu and Kashmir, India
- Date: 25 January 1990; 11am-2 pm
- Target: Kashmiri Civilians
- Attack type: Massacre
- Deaths: 21 killed
- Injuries: 75 wounded
- Perpetrator: Border Security Force

The Handwara massacre was the killing of 21 Kashmiri civilians by the Border Security Force on 25 January 1990 in Handwara, a town in the Kupwara district of Jammu and Kashmir, India.

== Background ==
Prior to the Handwara incident, on 21 January 1990, the Central Reserve Police Force (CRPF) had opened fire on protesters at the Gawkadal bridge in Srinagar, leading to significant civilian casualties. This event, known as the Gawkadal massacre, intensified public outrage and led to widespread protests across the region.

== Massacre ==
On 25 January 1990, thousands of residents gathered in Handwara to protest the Gawkadal massacre and demand accountability for massacre which had occurred four days earlier. The protesters, chanting slogans and waving placards, marched through the town. As the procession approached the Handwara Police Station, a Tata Matador (407) carrying BSF personnel arrived at the scene.

According to eyewitnesses, the BSF personnel opened fire indiscriminately into the crowd without any warning. The shooting resulted in the immediate deaths of 21 civilians and left over 75 others injured. The victims included women and children, with several eyewitnesses described the scene as chaotic and harrowing, with bodies lying on the ground and survivors scrambling to escape the gunfire.
