= Qazi Nisar =

Mirwaiz of South Kashmir

Qazi Nisar was the Mirwaiz of South Kashmir. He was a founding member of the Muslim United Front (MUF) that contested the rigged 1987 Legislative Assembly elections in Jammu and Kashmir, and Ummat e Islami. He was a vocal advocate of freedom for Kashmiris.

His son, Qazi Yasir, is also serving as the Mirwaiz of South Kashmir.

== Early life ==
Qazi Nisar Ahmad was born in 1952, the son of Qazi Ghulam Mohammed. He pursued his early education at Nusrat ul Islam Anantnag. He was the grandson of Qazi Qamar u Din, who led an uprising against the Maharaja of Jammu Kashmir Pratap Singh. His two brothers were killed during the uprising.

== Activism ==
His activism started at age 19, when he was arrested for the first time for organising a protest against the then Congressman, Mufti Mohammed Sayeed. He was bailed out after a week and was arrested again a month later. In 1985, he was jailed in Amphala jail for 6 months. He went to watch Indian Parliament proceedings where he bashed the parliamentarians in one of his best speeches on the hanging of Mohammed Maqbool Bhat. He was perhaps one of the first people to observe 11 February as the "Day of Reaffirmation" alongside Shakeel Bakshi, Nayeem Khan and Yasin Malik. in 1985 he openly defied Governor Jagmohan’s dictate not to consume beef, sacrificing two cows in the main town square of Anantnag. In 1986, he was detained again. "In Central Jail alone more than 1000 against a capacity of low hundreds were lodged in central Jail Srinagar, 50 people were lodged in each cell against a capacity of 15-20 people," says Mohammed Saeed from Pahalgam. He was detained again for 7 months in 1988 and 30 months in 1990.

Launched in 1985, after the escalation of human rights violations in Kashmir, The Khyri Aam Trust, spread across Kashmir, undertaking social work initiatives. The trust provided monthly compensation to widows of war and families of war victims. The trust operated across Southern Kashmir. They rehabilitated flood victims and provided temporary shelter to victims. He assisted in the marriage of more than 100 poor girls.

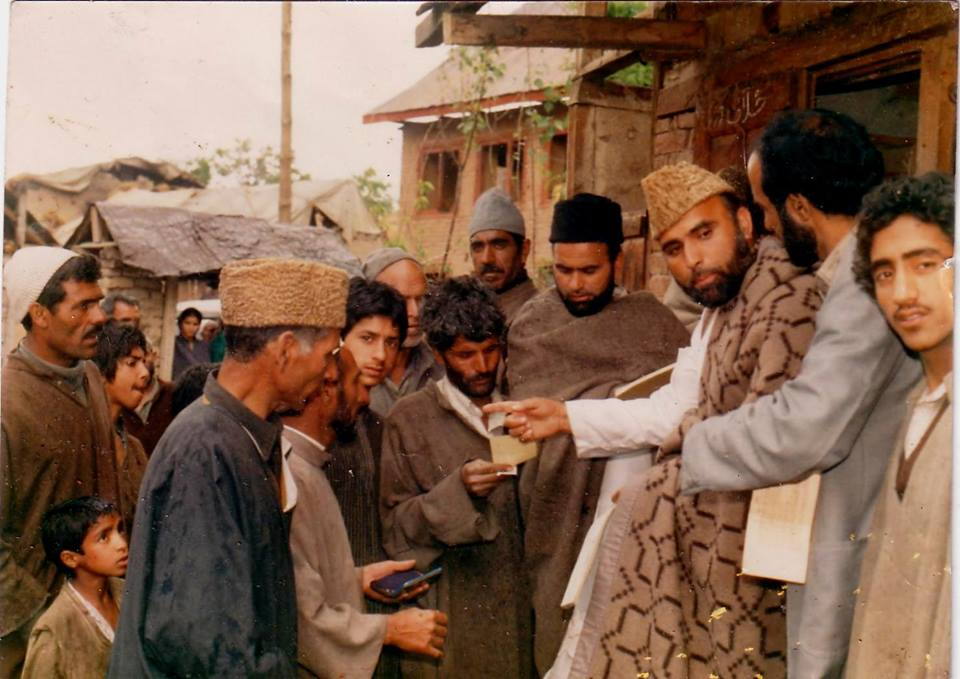
Khyri Aam Members distributing relief at Chowgam

He was an enthusiastic human rights activist. He documented human rights violations in Kashmir and presented them to various human rights bodies including the Red Cross Society and Amnesty International. He presented memoranda to United Nations Members and Islamic Nations including Egypt, Saudi Arabia, Iran, and Iraq. He got FIRs registered in many inhumane killings, massacres, and rapes.

== Waqf Board ==
In the early 90's after his release from the Jail, Jammu Kashmir had been placed under Governor's rule after the Kashmiri Pandit exodus from the valley. The president until 1994, had an absolute and unfettered power to impose Article 356 on any state, which is experiencing political unrest. Though established in 1940s for the welfare of Muslims and to manage and safeguard” the Waqf properties belonging to Jammu Muslims. The Auqaf was initially controlling the shrines in Kashmir, however, by the 1990s, the Auqaf had taken over several mosques in Kashmir and was under the direct control of the central Government.

Dr. Qazi Nisar who had campaigned for local representation of the Auqaf and wanted no Government intervention in religious affairs started an extensive campaign against the running of the board by administrative officials under the direct control of the central Government under Narasimha Rao. In his addresses, he often remarked, "How unfortunate are Kashmiris that are major mosques are run by Sanghis and our donation money come back for our destruction."

Through the virtue of several meetings and memorandums, Dr. Qazi Nisar put forth a basic constitution, and structure of the Auqaf before the authorities which was a handsome representation of public sentiments. He spoke of a 100-member council for the Auqaf, that would include two members from all the Tehsil mosques of the district and the members would then choose a head through the virtue of a vote. Dr. Qazi Nisar was strongly against the usage of the Auqaf donation money by the government and through the virtue of his memorandums, he established that Auqaf money could be used for teaching the underprivileged kids, publication of Sufi literature, building schools and hospitals.

He often repeated in his sermons, "I will not let my money be used against me by the Government. My people, take the Aquaf back or else it will devastate us all in the future."

== Ummat e Islami ==
Qazi Nisar founded the socio-religious organisation, Ummat e Islami in 1986 as a collective resistance movement against the suspension of Muslim employees in the Kashmir Valley. "He was approached several times by Agencies from both India and Pakistan," says Mir Muntazir, the General Secretary of the organisation. "He believed that people are his support and he needs no other. He did not swear allegiance to either of the two sides". The organisation died because of a lack of finances. "He was approached several times by members from both the sides. The Indian agencies approached through journalists, doctors, clerics at times which often got him agitated and because of that reason some journalists also wrote against him," added Muntazir.

== Back to Kashmir ==
Nisar returned to Kashmir in 1984 and worked at the Department of Arabic at Kashmir University. He quit the job and chose to work for his people. He served initially as a preacher at Magarmal Bagh in Srinagar, and after the death of his father, went to Islamabad to serve as the chief preacher there. He continued to preach there until he was assassinated by Pro India gunmen in 1994.

Later he served a PSA in Kuthua Jail alongside Mohammed Ashraf Sahrai and Ghulam Nabi Sumji. Sehrai remembers those days as "toughest days of life" He recalls that Qazi Nisar was the first one who asked SP Kathua jail "to allow them to pray in congregation". The demand was refused but consequently agreed to after all of us hunger striked".

== Muslim United Front ==
Nisar expressed unity with the president of Jamiat Ahli Hadith. Nisar led mass protests against the suspension of employees and the atrocities against Muslim employees. Abdul Gani Bhat was also suspended that year. People across the state responded to the call for unity. All schools of thought came under a single banner on important occasions to offer prayers. This led to the formation of Ummat e Islami, whose slogan became "Aapka Maslak Aapko Mubarak". The unity show later spread to other parts of Jammu Kashmir when Abbas Ansari, the patron of Itehad ul Muslimeen, met Nisar at Islamabad. The party was later named Muslim United Front as proposed by Ghulam Qadir Wani.

Muslim United front remains one of the least-documented chapters of Kashmir history. The apolitical group that mainly rose from Islamabad for the rights of the oppressed community in Jammu & Kashmir spread by late 1986 after Nisar's release on 2 November 1986 after he had been arrested for challenging the orders of Governor Jagmohan. Initially the group decided to focus on issues such as the Pregnancy Abortion Bill, by Shah Banoo Case. In the meantime, elections were underway in the state and some groups wanted the MUF to contest elections. After initial disagreements, the second vote slightly favoured that elections be contested. The elections were rigged. Nisar was the only candidate to speak in all 44 constituencies.

He devised the slogan "Dastgeer Souba Qalam Karun Haz Kamyaab" which was adopted by all the constituents of MUF including Jamaat e Islami."Five people who became core members of 'Majlis-e-- Muntazima' included Nisar, Molvi Abbas Ansari, Prof. Abdul Gani Bhat, Qadir Wani and Amir-e-Jam'aat Ghulam Mohammad Bhat. He became a leader of the Muslim United Front and his organisation came into the limelight.

== Armed struggle ==
Nisar was one of the first to support men such as Shakeel Bakshi, Ashfaq Majeed Wani, Mohammed Yasin Malik, and Nayeem Khan… "we used to visit him in Magarmal bagh mosque, attend his Friday sermons and discuss with him the strategies to fight with India", said Nayeem Khan. "He had close ties with Amanuallah Khan. Amanuallah Khan" says Hamidullah Bawani, the then vice chairman of Ummat e Islami. He had a close association with the JKLF, and its vice president Bashir Ahmed Bhat was his childhood friend. He used to lead the secret meetings that were held before events of armed fighting. Ashfaq used to visit Islamabad to meet Nisar which gave rise to the birth of an armed fighting in Kashmir. Nisar was again one of the first to support armed fighting; in his speeches and writings he always supported the armed struggle. In one of his speeches he openly denounced the fatwa against HAJY Group of JKLF and denounced other Fatwas against Maqbool Bhat and other JKLF patriarchs.

After the beginning of militancy in Kashmir, he was arrested, but as soon as he was released he organised a union between all militant groups that had been infighting since 1990. Two Britons, father and son that were kidnapped on 6 June 1994 at Pahalgam were released after his intervention, because he was respected among the militant groups for speaking out against human rights violations. He used to say “Harkat is my tongue, Hizb is my tongue, Ikhwan is my eye”.

== Scholar ==
In 1984, he laid the foundation of the Islamic Research Institute where thousands of poor children received free education. He was an outspoken speaker and pursued Islamic education from Aligarh and Ashrafiya. He was an Islamic scholar and his Fatwa was accepted throughout the subcontinent and the Persian Gulf. Allama Arshid ul Qadri, one of the most versatile Indian scholars known as Ra’ees ul Qalam once called him “The hope of East”.

He authored the books Tehqeeq i Nazar, Salwat un Nabi, Harkat ul Fikriyah, Nikah e Baligah and many others. He was the editor of m'onthly magazine Islamabad. He wrote poetry and authored many articles published in local, national and international newspapers. He stated “My Deen does not side with oppressors’. He laid the foundation of many schools, libraries, and masjids that taught thousands of children.

His poetry addressed themes concerning marginalized and socially excluded groups and has been discussed in relation to postmodern poets, including Yeti Draaw Hajas, Tati Wolukh Gangae Musalmaan, and Barbaad Kor Aem Indrayi Hind Rajivn Musalmaan.

== Death ==
On 19 June 1994, Qazi Nisar was assassinated by the unknown gunmen at Dialgam his assassination resulted in a rise of pro-New Delhi armed militant group Ikhwan which was operating against the kashmiri separatists in order to counter the Insurgency in Jammu and Kashmir in the behalf of indian government it is believed that Ikhwan militia was behind the assassination of Nisar. The Kashmiri separatist JkLF leader Yasin Malik recalls "Dr. Qazi Nisar’s struggle and sacrifices cannot be ignored by anyone and today we all express our gratitude and love for this noble soul. Today when we remember him, we all should follow his footsteps and come forward to save our national identity and resistance movement".
