= 1971 Indian Airlines hijacking =

Aviation incident

- The destroyed aircraft at Lahore Airport

Hijacking
- Date: 30 January 1971
- Summary: Aircraft hijacking
- Site: Lahore Airport, Pakistan; 31°31′17″N 74°24′12″E

Aircraft
- Aircraft type: Fokker F-27 Friendship 100
- Aircraft name: Ganga
- Operator: Indian Airlines
- Registration: VT-DMA
- Flight origin: Srinagar Airport
- Destination: Jammu Airport
- Occupants: 32
- Passengers: 29
- Crew: 3
- Fatalities: 0
- Survivors: 32

On 30 January 1971, an Indian Airlines Fokker F27, named Ganga, flying from Srinagar to Jammu, was hijacked by two Kashmiri separatists belonging to the National Liberation Front (NLF). The aircraft was flown to Lahore Airport in Pakistan, where the passengers and the crew were released, and was burnt down three days later. The hijackers were later identified as Hashim Qureshi and his cousin Ashraf Qureshi.

India claimed that Pakistan was behind the hijacking and subsequently banned overflights of Pakistani aircraft over the Indian territory. Pakistani authorities arrested the hijackers, and a one-man investigation committee consisting of a Pakistani judge, declared the hijacking to be an Indian conspiracy. While several people were arrested in connection with the case, only Hashim Qureshi was convicted and sentenced to seven years in prison. India never responded to Pakistani allegations, and Hashim Qureshi later stated that only NLF was behind the hijack.

== Background ==
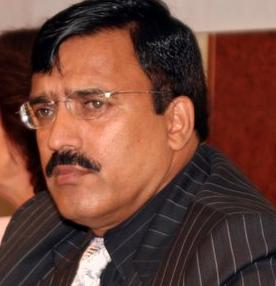
Hashim Qureshi, one of the hijackers

=== Aircraft ===
The aircraft involved was a Fokker F27, named Ganga, which was one of the oldest aircraft in the Indian Airlines fleet. It had already been withdrawn from regular commercial service earlier but was re-inducted a few days before the hijacking.

=== Hijackers ===
The hijackers were Hashim Qureshi and his cousin, Ashraf Qureshi. Hashim Qureshi was a Srinagar resident. He traveled to Peshawar in 1969, where he met Maqbool Bhat of the National Liberation Front (NLF), a self-declared armed wing of the Azad Kashmir Plebiscite Front. Hashim Qureshi joined the NLF and was given an ideological education and lessons in guerrilla warfare in Rawalpindi. In order to draw the world's attention to the Kashmiri independence movement, the NLF planned an airline hijacking fashioned after the Dawson's Field hijackings by the Palestinian militants. The Qureshis were tasked with the hijacking, and were trained by Jamshed Manto, a former pilot of the Pakistan Air Force. However, Hashim Qureshi was arrested by the Indian Border Security Force (BSF), when he tried to re-enter Kashmir. The arms and equipment, which were meant to be used for the hijacking, were also intercepted and ceased by the Indian authorities. Hashim Qureshi negotiated his way out after a deal with the authorities to help find other operatives of the NLF who were allegedly in the Indian territory and sought an appointment in the BSF to provide such help. Later, the Qureshis made look-alike explosives out of wood and used toy guns for the hijack.

== Hijacking ==
The aircraft was flying from Srinagar to Jammu on 30 January 1971, when it was hijacked. The Jammu control tower was alerted of the hijack, and the plane was soon trailed by Indian Air Force aircraft. However, the hijackers instructed the pilot to divert towards Pakistan, and the aircraft later landed at the Lahore Airport. Pakistani Armed Forces surrounded the plane at the tarmac. Hashim Qureshi reportedly called Farooq Haider, a NLF leader, to inform that the plane had been hijacked and landed at Lahore. Farooq Haider offered to get back after consulting with Maqbool Bhat. The hijackers planned to demand the release of various NLF prisoners lodged in Indian jails for the safe return of the hostages.

However, the airport authorities managed to secure the release of all the passengers and the crew, and they were returned to India. The authorities reportedly impersonated Haider, and fooled the hijackers into releasing them. The aircraft was on the tarmac for eighty hours, during which the Pakistani security personnel thoroughly searched the aircraft. They removed papers and postal bags found in it, contrary to international law. Eventually, upon the advice of the authorities, Hashim Qureshi burnt the aircraft.

== Aftermath ==
In the immediate aftermath, the Qureshis and other NLF leaders were lauded as national heroes in Pakistan. Zulfikar Bhutto, the chairman of the Pakistan Peoples Party, had come to the airport to personally pay tribute to the hijackers. People took out processions in support of the NLF in Pakistan, particularly in Azad Kashmir and Punjab. However, Mujibur Rahman of the Awami League, which had won the elections in East Pakistan, raised doubts that Pakistan president Yahya Khan and Zulfikar Bhutto had colluded to plan the incident, and demanded an official enquiry. Later, the military regime, led by Yahya Khan, disassociated itself from the hijackers.

India claimed that Pakistan was behind the hijacking and subsequently banned overflights of Pakistani aircraft over the Indian territory. The ban later had a significant impact on the Pakistani troop movement into East Pakistan from West Pakistan during the Bangladesh Liberation War. After the ban, the Pakistani press claimed that the hijack was an Indian conspiracy, which was enacted to facilitate the overflight ban.

A single member judicial commission, consisting of judge Noorul Arifeen, was formed by the Pakistani government to investigate the incident. The commission declared the hijacking to be an Indian conspiracy, citing Hashim Qureshi's appointment in the Indian BSF. In addition to the hijackers, the Pakistani government detained Maqbool Bhat and 150 other members of the NLF, and held them at the Lahore Fort. Most of them were held without any charges, and were reportedly tortured for information until December 1971. Later, a special military tribunal, consisting of two judges, was formed to try the hijacking case, and six people were eventually brought to trial. By then Zulfikar Bhutto had become the president, having taken over from Yahya Khan. Only Hashim Qureshi was convicted of terrorism and sentenced to seven years in prison, while the others were acquitted and released.

Abdul Ansari, who was amongst those arrested, later testified during his trial in the High Court of Azad Kashmir in 1971, that the hijacking had emboldened the people to question the corrupt practices of Azad Kashmiri leaders and, in reaction, the government arrested them and forced them to confess to being Indian agents. Amanullah Khan, the leader of the Plebiscite Front, and thirteen of his colleagues were sentenced to 14 years in prison, after being accused of being Indian agents. However, they were released in 1972, after being imprisoned for 15 months in a prison in Gilgit, as protests broke out in support of them in Gilgit-Baltistan. Hashim Qureshi, who was released after serving his sentence, and later returned to India, commented that 400 members of the Plebiscite Front were arrested in Pakistan after the hijacking. Later, Amanullah Khan and Abdul Ansari moved to the United Kingdom, where they found active support from the Mirpuri diaspora. Later, they converted the Plebiscite Front into a new organisation named as the Jammu and Kashmir Liberation Front, which spearheaded the Kashmir insurgency in the 1980s.

Journalist Braj Mohan Sinha, who authored the book The Samba Spy Case, based on the Samba spy scandal, claimed that the hijacking was a clearly planned operation by the Indian intelligence to provoke Pakistan. As per him, while the intended objective was to justify restricting Pakistani overflights and limit movements to East Pakistan, the burning of the plane was unplanned and happened due to the involvement of Pakistani politicians. He also claimed that Hashim Qureshi was a double agent, and while he initially worked for India, he was turned by Pakistan during his visit to the country, but later agreed to work with the Indian authorities after his capture. However, India never responded to the allegations and Hashim Qureshi has maintained that the NLF was behind the planning and execution of the hijack.

== In popular media ==
A Hindi film titled IB71, starring Vidyut Jammwal, was released in May 2023, based on this hijacking.

== See also ==
- Air India Flight 182 – 1985 aircraft bombing over the Atlantic Ocean
- Indian Airlines Flight 814 – 1999 Indian aircraft hijacking
- List of accidents and incidents involving airliners by location
- List of accidents and incidents involving commercial aircraft
- List of aircraft hijackings
- List of hijackings of Indian aeroplanes
