= Neelkanth Ganjoo =

Indian high court judge

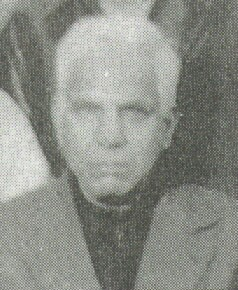
- Last known photo

Judge of the Jammu and Kashmir High Court

Personal details
- Born: 16 February 1922
- Died: 4 November 1989 (aged 67) Srinagar, India

Neelkanth Ganjoo (died 4 November 1989) was an Indian high court judge based in Srinagar who was assassinated by Kashmiri-separatist militants.

== About ==
In the late 1960s, as a sessions court judge, he had presided over the trial of JKLF founder Maqbool Bhat in the murder of police inspector Amar Chand in 1966. In August 1968, he sentenced Bhat and one other to death. This sentence was upheld by the Supreme Court of India in 1982. In 1984, after JKLF cadres in Britain murdered diplomat Ravindra Mhatre, Bhat's execution was carried out in Tihar jail. The same year, some militants bombed Ganjoo's house.

On 4 November 1989, three militants shot Ganjoo dead the Hari Singh Street market, near the High Court in Srinagar.
