= Murder and rape of Sarla Bhat =

1990 murder in Jammu and Kashmir, India

- Sarla Bhat
- Location: 34°08′15.46″N 74°48′00.64″E; Srinagar, Jammu and Kashmir, India
- Date: 15 April 1990–19 April 1990
- Target: Sarla Bhat
- Attack type: Abduction, sexual assault (rape), torture and murder
- Victim: Sarla Bhat
- Perpetrator: militants of the JKLF
- Motive: Targeted militant violence against Kashmiri Hindus
- Accused: Mohammad Yasin Malik, Khurshid Ahmad Chalkoo, Abdul Hamid Sheikh, Mohammad Yousuf Sofi (Idrees), and Ghulam Mohammad Taploo
- Charges: Sections 364, 341 and 302, read with sections 34, 201 and 120-B, of the Ranbir Penal Code; sections 3(2), 3(3), 4 and 6 of the Terrorist and Disruptive Activities (Prevention) Act; Sections 7 and 27 of the Arms Act, 1959

In April 1990, Sarla Bhat, a Kashmiri Hindu woman was abducted and murdered after being tortured and reportedly raped by Muslim militants of the JKLF during the insurgency in Jammu and Kashmir.

Originally from Anantnag, Bhat was 27 years old and working as a nurse at Sher-i-Kashmir Institute of Medical Sciences (SKIMS) in Srinagar, Jammu and Kashmir at the time of her death. She was abducted on 15 April from her hostel in Srinagar, reportedly raped, tortured, killed, and her body mutilated by her captors, who accused her of being a "mukhbir" (lit. 'informer'). The acronym JKLF was engraved upon her body. Her dead body was found on 19 April and handed over the next day to her family in Anantnag, who were unable to provide an appropriate cremation due to threats by militants, harassment and abuse by some locals and a grenade attack on the family’s home. Her death and the grenade attack caused panic in her mostly Hindu ancestral mohalla (lit. 'neighbourhood') in Anantnag—which had been nearly emptied due to threats received during the then-ongoing forced displacement of Kashmiri Hindus—compelling all the remaining Hindu inhabitants there to flee. Bhat's own family fled to Jammu. A police complaint was filed in 1990 but did not result in a full investigation.

In 2024, the state investigation agency of Jammu and Kashmir police reopened the investigation. In June 2026, the agency filed a chargesheet in an anti-terrorism court in Srinagar, accusing former militant commander of the JKLF Yasin Malik of commanding the killing, and identified four perpetrators (three since dead, one absconding) for planning and executing the crime. The chargesheet stated that the killing was part of targeted violence against Kashmiri Pandits amid rising militancy, contributing to fear causing their forced displacement in 1990.

== Background ==
Sarla Bhat was the eldest child of Shambhu Nath Bhat and was born sometime in 1963. Her father worked as a school teacher, and they lived in the Qazi Bagh mohalla of Anantnag, a neighbourhood whose residents were mostly Kashmiri Hindus, primarily Pandits. She had graduated with a degree in English literature from a government college in Anantnag and later pursued a BSc in Nursing. According to a cousin, Bhat had refused to get married and instead decided to work to support her family. In 1990, she was working as a staff nurse in the neonatology department at the Sher-i-Kashmir Institute of Medical Sciences (SKIMS) in Soura, Srinagar. Many members of her family, including her uncle, had fled the Kashmir Valley during the forced displacement of Kashmiri Hindus that year due to threats and violence of the insurgency in the region. She, however, continued to work in Srinagar despite such threats, according to her cousin.

== Abduction and murder ==
On 15 April 1990, Bhat was abducted from her hostel in Srinagar. Several reports mention that Bhat was raped and tortured in captivity. Her mutilated dead body was found on the morning of 19 April on the side of a road in Mallabagh, Soura of downtown Srinagar, with a hand-written note attached to it. In the note, militants of Jammu and Kashmir Liberation Front (JKLF) had taken responsibility for killing her, and accused her of informing the police about the presence of militants at the hospital. (Note: The police has denied the accusation of Bhat being an informant, and said that the murder followed the prevalent pattern of "targeted killings of Kashmiri Pandits during the 1990s.") The acronym JKLF had been engraved upon her body.

== Aftermath ==
On the night of 20 April, the body was handed over to Bhat's family in Anantnag. A neighbour who had been present at Bhat's house and helped with her funeral noted in a memoir that the body:

… was bullet-ridden and covered with blood. There were torture marks all over the body. It became clear to us that she had been violated and sexually assaulted before being killed.

Only three Hindu families had remained in their formerly Hindu-majority neighbourhood. According to the memoir, though Muslim neighbours had been gathering to offer condolences, they were soon warned by militants against doing so. In the absence of Hindu neighbours and of help from Muslim ones, the family experienced difficulties in arranging for appropriate cremation of the body. According to several accounts, a crowd of between 150–200 people also attempted to prevent funerary rituals related to Bhat's cremation, mocked and abused the relatives trying to collect her ashes—asking them why they hadn't still fled Kashmir—and trampled the ashes under their feet. Several accounts also state that a hand grenade was hurled at the family's home. The grenade exploded near the house's main gate, according to Bhat's cousin who was present at the house at the time of the attack. (Note: According to a 2016 memoir written by a neighbour, who had heard about the grenade from another individual, the grenade did not explode.) Her death and the events that followed spread panic in the area, with both Muslims and Hindus expressing apprehensions and rumours of more targeted killings and rapes against Hindus. Several Hindu families in the region, including all remaining ones in the Qazi Bagh neighbourhood, fled the Kashmir Valley as a result. According to Bhat's cousin, the police failed to help Bhat's family after the grenade attack at their house, following which the family sought the help of armymen who aided them in fleeing to safety in Jammu.

== Investigation ==
After the murder, a police complaint was filed for murder, criminal conspiracy and terrorism under the Indian penal code and TADA. But an investigation did not materialise. A postmortem examination reportedly concluded that Bhat had been raped prior to killing. (Note: As reported after the incident and in several later reports, including those by Human Rights Watch. In a 2016 memoir about the aftermath of her death and cremation, a neighbour noted that upon seeing her body, "it became clear … that she had been violated and sexually assaulted before being killed." In a 2025 story for ThePrint, however, her family claimed that the post-mortem had "ruled out rape.") According to journalist Ahmed Ali Fayyaz, Bhat's murder was not seen as "high-profile." In March 2024, the murder case was transferred to the state investigation agency (SIA) of Jammu and Kashmir police under the orders of the Jammu and Kashmir Director General of Police. The police statement did not mention rape. The SIA denied the accusation of Bhat passing information to the police and said that her murder followed the prevalent pattern of "targeted killings of Kashmiri Pandits during the 1990s." In August 2025, eight locations in Srinagar were raided by the SIA in relation to the murder, including the houses of former JKLF militant Yasin Malik and others. (Note: Others whose houses were raided include former JKLF member Javeed Mir, Peer Noor ul Haq Shah, Reyaz Kabir Sheikh, Bashir Ahmad Gojri, Feroz Ahmad Khan, Kaiser Ahmad Tiploo, and Ghulam Mohammad Taploo.) According to journalist Ahmed Ali Fayyaz, Bhat's killing had coincided with the hospitalisation of Malik at SKIMS. The note found on her body had accused her of passing information to police that had led to a raid on 8 April 1990 in Srinagar's old town in which an injured Yasin Malik had escaped but some other members of the JKLF had been arrested. According to a 'senior police official', Bhat's murder was related to the arrest of a JKLF affiliated employee at SKIMS, and Bhat was framed as an informant because she was Kashmiri Pandit. In June 2026, the SIA reportedly identified four suspects, three of whom were dead and one had likely escaped to Pakistan, and established that the killing had been commanded by Yasin Malik.

=== Chargesheet ===
On 29 June 2026, the SIA filed a 737-page chargesheet before the Court of the Additional Sessions Judge (TADA/POTA), designated as a Special Judge under the National Investigation Agency Act, 2008, in Srinagar. The chargesheet named five accused: Mohammad Yasin Malik, Khurshid Ahmad Chalkoo, Abdul Hamid Sheikh, Mohammad Yousuf Sofi, also known as Idrees, and Ghulam Mohammad Taploo. The SIA described Malik, who was then the chief commander of the Jammu Kashmir Liberation Front (JKLF), as the principal conspirator and alleged that he directed the other accused to abduct and kill Bhat. Chalkoo was identified in the chargesheet as the alleged gunman. Sheikh, Sofi and Taploo had died before the chargesheet was filed; Malik was in judicial custody in a separate case, while Chalkoo was absconding and was believed by investigators to have crossed into Pakistan-administered Kashmir. Proclamation proceedings were initiated against Chalkoo.

== Cultural depictions ==
The aftermath of the incident, particularly the events surrounding Bhat's funeral and cremation, were recounted in a memoir by neighbour Indu Bhushan Zutshi in the 2016 anthology A Long Dream of Home, edited by Siddhartha Gigoo and Varad Sharma.

== See also ==
- Rape and murder of Girija Tickoo

== Bibliography ==
- Banerjee, Argha (2017), "'Refugee in My Own Country': Trauma and Memory in the Writings of Kashmiri Pandits in Exile", in Majoul, Bootheina (ed.), On Trauma and Traumatic Memory, Cambridge Scholars Publishing, pp. 9–28
- Khan, Nyla Ali (2010), Islam, Women, and Violence in Kashmir: Between India and Pakistan, Palgrave Macmillan
- Manchanda, Rita (2001), "Guns and Burqa: Women in the Kashmir Conflict", in Manchanda, Rita (ed.), Women, War and Peace in South Asia: Beyond Victimhood to Agency, SAGE Publications, pp. 42–101
- Zutshi, Indu Bushan (2016), "She was killed because she was an informant; no harm will come to you", in Gigoo, Siddhartha; Sharma, Varad (eds.), A Long Dream of Home: The Persecution, Exile and Exodus of Kashmiri Pandits, Bloomsbury Publishing
