= Farooq Ahmed Dar =

Indian Kashmiri militant

- Born: Farooq Ahmed Dar; 1 January 1973 (age 53); Srinagar, J&K, India
- Other name: Bitta Karate
- Years active: 1990-date
- Organization: JKLF
- Known for: Role in separatist activities during the Kashmir insurgency in 1990.
- Criminal charge: Violation of Public Safety Act.
- Criminal penalty: Pending
- Criminal status: Arrested and detained by NIA
- Spouse: Assbah Arzoomand Khan
- Mother: Fatima

Farooq Ahmed Dar known by his nom de guerre Bitta Karate, (born 1 January 1973) is a Kashmiri separatist and Ex militant who currently in the Tihar Jail right now, is from Kashmir Valley of Jammu and Kashmir, India.

Dubbed as the "Butcher of Pandits," due to a confession interview Dar has admitted on camera to massacring multiple Kashmiri Hindu Pandits during the 1990 Kashmir insurgency leading up to the Exodus of Kashmiri Hindus. He was imprisoned from 1990 until 2006 under terrorism-related charges before being released on bail. He was arrested again in 2019 for financing terrorism.

== Early life ==
Dar was born on 1 January 1973 in the Guru Bazar neighbourhood of the city of Srinagar in the Kashmir Valley of Jammu and Kashmir, India into a Kashmiri Muslim family of the Dar clan. While "Bitta" was his pet name, he was given the suffix "Karate" because of his mastery in martial arts. Dar used to work for his family business until he left his home to become a militant in his early 20s. He became infamous during the militancy of the 1990s.

== Militancy ==
In 1988, Farooq Ahmed Dar was taken across the LoC to Pakistan-administered Kashmir by the then JKLF chief commander Ashfaq Majeed Wani for armed training. Dar was blindfolded and then taken to Pakistan-administered Kashmir along with other "trainees" where they received 32-day armed training.

Farooq Ahmad Dar operated as a militant of the Jammu Kashmir Liberation Front and participated in the militant activities. He has admitted on camera to have killed over 20 Kashmiri Pandits. His first victim was a young businessman, Satish Kumar Tickoo, whom Dar knew and often took a lift from. Tickoo was called out of his house and shot to be killed on 2 February 1990. He apparently used to get orders (for execution) from Ashfaq Majeed Wani or other superiors in the JKLF. According to Kashmiri Muslim sources in downtown Kashmir, Dar would walk armed on the streets of Srinagar in search of Kashmiri Pandits and on spotting, he would take out his pistol and shoot at them. He used pistols to kill civilians and AK-47 to attack and fire at Indian Security Forces. He admitted to killing at least 20 people in 1990 during the insurgency. According to the convener of Panun Kashmir, he had admitted to killing 42 Kashmiri Pandits.

=== 1990 arrest ===
Farooq Ahmed Dar, along with two of his associates, was arrested by Border Security Force on 22 June 1990 from Srinagar. He was arrested and detained under the Public Safety Act and had 19 cases against him. He remained under detention for 16 years and was released on indefinite bail in October 2006. Dar was detained in various prisons across India. He served time in Kot Bhalwal Jail in Jammu, District Jail in Kathua, Central Jail in Jodhpur, Central Jail in Agra etc.

=== 2006 indefinite bail and release ===
On 23 October 2006, a court enforcing Terrorist and Disruptive Activities (Prevention) Act (TADA court) in Jammu granted bail to Dar and he was handed over to his family on 25 October 2006. He was initially granted bail for four months against a bail bond and personal surety of ₹1 lakh (equivalent to ₹3.5 lakh or US$3,640.00 in 2026) each. Dar was released after spending 16 years in jail. His detention under the Public Safety Act was quashed by the Supreme Court of India before his release from jail. His release was condemned by several Kashmiri Pandit organizations. Dar got a warm reception from his supporters in Kashmir. Large number of supporters assembled at his house where flower petals and confetti was showered on him. Then, Dar was taken out in a procession to an Eidgah where prayers were offered.

While dictating the verdict, the TADA court judge, Justice Wani remarked:

The court is aware of the fact that the allegations against the accused are of serious nature and carry a punishment of death sentence or life imprisonment but the fact is that the prosecution has shown total disinterest in arguing the case.

=== 2006-2019 political career ===
Upon release from detention, Dar joined the Jammu Kashmir Liberation Front (R) where he worked his way up to become its chairman.

=== 2019 arrest and detention in terror funding case ===
The National Investigation Agency (NIA) arrested him again in 2019 on charges of terror funding. NIA has charged Dar, Sayeed Salahudeen, and others of "conspiring to wage war against the government" and fomenting trouble in the Kashmir Valley. His co-accused is the Hizbul Mujahideen's head Sayeed Salahudeen.

A Kashmiri pandit has called for the reopening of the trial against Dar.

== See also ==
- Persecution of Hindus
- Exodus of Kashmiri Hindus
- 2003 Nadimarg massacre of Kashmiri Hindus
- 1998 Wandhama massacre of Kashmiri Hindus
- Kashmir intifada
- Terrorism in India
- Islamic Terrorism in India
- Pakistani-sponsored terrorism in India

== Bibliography ==
- Pandita, Rahul (2013). Our Moon Has Blood Clots: The Exodus of the Kashmiri Pandits. Random House India. ISBN 978-81-8400-390-1.
