= Azad Kashmir Plebiscite Front =

Plebiscite Front Mahaz-i-Raishumari
- Leader: Amanullah Khan
- President: Abdul Khaliq Ansari
- Founded: April 1965
- Succeeded by: Jammu and Kashmir Liberation Front
- Political position: Called for a plebiscite on whether Kashmir should join India or Pakistan or become independent.

The Plebiscite Front in Azad Kashmir, also called Mahaz-i-Raishumari, was founded by Amanullah Khan in collaboration with Abdul Khaliq Ansari and Maqbool Bhat in 1965. The organisation had an unofficial armed wing called National Liberation Front, which carried out sabotage activities and murders in Jammu and Kashmir as well as the hijacking of Ganga. Amanullah Khan later moved to England, where he revived the National Liberation Front under the new name Jammu Kashmir Liberation Front (JKLF).

== History ==
The Plebiscite Front was the initiative of Gilgit-born Amanullah Khan, who after graduating with a law degree in Karachi, set up a Kashmir Independence Committee advocating the ideology of independence for the entire princely state of Jammu and Kashmir.

In April 1965, the Kashmir Independence Committee merged into the newly launched Plebiscite Front in Muzaffarabad. Abdul Khaliq Ansari was its president, Amanullah Khan the general secretary and Maqbool Bhat the publicity secretary. Journalist Arif Jamal states that, the participants drove to an unguarded location of the Kashmir Line of Control near Suchetgarh, brought back soil from the Indian-administered Jammu and Kashmir, took an oath that they would work exclusively for the liberation of the former princely state.

== National Liberation Front ==
Amanullah Khan and Maqbool Bhat also wanted to set up an armed wing for the Plebiscite Front, but the proposal did not get the majority support in the Plebiscite Front. Undeterred, they established an underground group called National Liberation Front (NLF), obtaining some support for it in August 1965. The group was fashioned after the Algerian Front de Libération Nationale. Major Amanullah, a former soldier in the Azad Kashmir forces, was in charge of the armed wing while Amanullah Khan and Mir Abdul Qayoom took charge of the political and financial wings. Maqbool Bhat was made responsible for the overall coordination. All the members swore in blood that they would be ready to sacrifice their lives for the objective of the NLF, viz., to create conditions in Jammu and Kashmir that enable its people to demand self-determination. The organisation was successful in recruiting members from Azad Kashmir, and obtained backing from the bureaucracy of the state.

The NLF recruited and trained a cadre of militants in the use of explosives and small arms. Crossing into Indian-administered Kashmir on 10 June 1966, they trained local workers in sabotage activities in the forests of Kupwara and set up secret cells. However, in September 1966, Bhat's group was compromised, possibly via Ghulam Muhammad Dar, who acted as a double agent. The group kidnapped a police inspector and, when he tried to escape, shot and killed him. The Indian army zeroed in on them, leading to an exchange of fire in the Kunial village near Handwara. A member of Bhat's group, Kala Khan, was killed in the action. Bhat and a colleague named Mir Ahmad were captured and tried for sabotage and murder, receiving death sentences from a Srinagar court in September 1968. Major Amanullah's wing waiting to receive the volunteers at the Line of Control retreated, but it was arrested by the Pakistan Army.

Maqbool Bhat's arrest brought the group's activities into the open, and sharply divided the Plebiscite Front. Nevertheless, they declared it an unconstitutional body and banned it. Meanwhile, Maqbool Bhat and Mir Ahmad escaped from the Indian prison in December 1968, along with another inmate Ghulam Yasin, tunneling their way out of the prison complex. They returned to Azad Kashmir in January 1969, creating a sensation in the militant circles. Their standing increased within the community, forcing the Plebiscite Front to abandon its opposition. However, the NLF's failed operations in Jammu and Kashmir put at risk all its sympathisers in the state, many of whom were arrested.

The militants' escape from an Indian prison was viewed with suspicion by Pakistan. Bhat and his colleagues were detained and brutally interrogated for several months. Long after their release, Bhat was still suspected of being a double agent. Pakistan extended little support to the other Indian youth that crossed over into Azad Kashmir for arms and training. Praveen Swami suggests that, as Pakistan was waging a covert war through its own network in Jammu and Kashmir, it did not want those official operations jeopardised by the amateur operators of the NLF.

The NLF continued its activities, sponsoring bomb explosions in the Jammu province. It targeted public places, such as railway stations and bus stations, and military installations in and around the cities of Jammu and Poonch. However, the international attention it was hoping to galvanise through the bombing campaign did not materialise.

== Ganga hijacking ==
Hashim Qureshi, a Srinagar resident who went to Peshawar on family business in 1969, met Maqbool Bhat and got inducted into the NLF. He was given an ideological education and lessons in guerrilla tactics in Rawalpindi. In order to draw the world's attention to the Kashmiri independence movement, the group planned an airline hijacking fashioned after the Dawson's Field hijackings by the Palestinian militants. Hashim Qureshi, along with his cousin Ashraf Qureshi, was ordered to execute one. A former Pakistani air force pilot Jamshed Manto trained him for the task. However, Qureshi was arrested by the Indian Border Security Force when he tried to reenter Indian-held Kashmir with arms and equipment. He negotiated his way out by claiming to help find other conspirators that were allegedly in the Indian territory, sought an appointment in the Border Security Force to provide such help. Maqbool Bhat sent Qureshi replacement equipment for the hijacking, but it fell into the hands of a double agent, who then turned it over to the Indian authorities. Undeterred, the Qureshis made look-alike explosives out of wood and hijacked an Indian Airlines plane called Ganga on 30 January 1971.

The hijackers landed the plane at Lahore and demanded the release of 36 NLF prisoners lodged in Indian jails. However, they succumbed to pressure from the airport authorities and ended up releasing all the passengers and the crew. Years later, Ashraf Qureshi admitted that they were naive and didn't realise that "the passengers were more important than the actual plane." Pakistan's Prime Minister Zulfikar Bhutto showed up at the airport and paid a handsome tribute to the hijackers. Indian Government then refused to carry out the demands. The plane lay on the tarmac for eighty hours, during which the Pakistani security personnel thoroughly searched the air plane and removed papers and postal bags they found in it. Eventually, upon the advice of the authorities, Hashim Qureshi burnt the plane down.

For some time, the Qureshis were lauded as heroes. After India reacted by banning overflight of Pakistani planes over India, the Pakistani authorities claimed that the hijack was staged by India, and arrested the hijackers and all their collaborators. A one-man investigation committee headed by Justice Noorul Arifeen declared the hijacking to be an Indian conspiracy, citing Qureshi's appointment in the Border Security Force. In addition to the hijackers, Maqbool Bhat and 150 other NLF fighters were arrested. Seven people were eventually brought to trial (the rest being held without charges). The High Court acquitted them of treason charges. Hashim Qureshi alone was sentenced to seven years in prison. Ironically, Ashraf Qureshi was released even though he was an equal participant in the hijacking. This is said to have been a deal made by Zulfikar Bhutto, by now the President of Pakistan, who declared that he would convict one hijacker but release the other.

Amanullah Khan was also imprisoned for 15 months in a Gilgit prison during 1970–72, accused of being an Indian agent. He was released after protests broke out in Gilgit. Thirteen of his colleagues were sentenced to 14 years in prison, but released after a year. According to Hashim Qureshi, 400 activists of the Plebiscite Front and NLF were arrested in Pakistan after the Ganga hijacking. Abdul Khaliq Ansari, who was arrested and tortured, testified in the High Court that the Ganga hijacking had emboldened the people to question the corrupt practices of the Azad Kashmir leaders and, in reaction, the government arrested them and forced them to confess to being Indian agents.

== Post-hijack operations ==
Further attempts by the NLF to infiltrate into Indian-administered Kashmir also met with failure. Praveen Swami states that the organisation did not have enough funds and infrastructure, or support from other sources, to make an impact inside India. Paul Staniland adds that "State repression" in the Indian-administered Kashmir also played a key role.

In May 1976, Maqbool Bhat reentered the Indian-administered Kashmir again. He was encouraged by the student protests against the 1974 Indira-Sheikh accord, by which Sheikh Abdullah agreed to return to constitutional politics. Bhat attempted to rob a bank in Kupwara. A bank employee was killed in the course of the robbery. Bhat was rearrested and received a second death sentence.

Bhat's arrest effectively broke the back of the NLF in Azad Kashmir. Amanullah Khan moved to England, where he received the enthusiastic support of the British Mirpuri community. The UK chapter of the Plebiscite Front was converted into the Jammu and Kashmir Liberation Front (JKLF) in May 1977 and formed an armed wing called the "National Liberation Army". Amanullah Khan took charge as the General Secretary of JKLF the following February.

== Bibliography ==
- Jamal, Arif (2009), Shadow War: The Untold Story of Jihad in Kashmir, Melville House, ISBN 978-1-933633-59-6
- Schofield, Victoria (2003) [First published in 2000], Kashmir in Conflict, London and New York: I. B. Taurus & Co, ISBN 1860648983
- Snedden, Christopher (2013) [first published as The Untold Story of the People of Azad Kashmir, 2012], Kashmir: The Unwritten History, HarperCollins India, ISBN 978-9350298985
- Staniland, Paul (2014), Networks of Rebellion: Explaining Insurgent Cohesion and Collapse, Cornell University Press, pp. 68–, ISBN 978-0-8014-7102-5
- Swami, Praveen (2007), India, Pakistan and the Secret Jihad: The covert war in Kashmir, 1947-2004, Asian Security Studies, Routledge, ISBN 978-0-415-40459-4
