= Front de Libération Nationale =

Front de Libération Nationale may refer to:

- National Liberation Front (Algeria), a socialist political party founded in 1954 for independence from France for Algeria
- National Liberation Front (Burundi), an ethnically Hutu rebel group that sometimes functions as a political party in Burundi
- National Liberation Front (Jammu Kashmir), the armed wing of Azad Kashmir Plebiscite Front founded in 1965.
