= Ashfaq Majeed Wani =

Separatist militant leader of JKLF from Srinagar, India

Commander of Jammu Kashmir Liberation Front
- Succeeded by: Yasin Malik

Personal details
- Born: Ashfaq Majeed Wani; 5 September 1966 Srinagar, J&K, India
- Died: 30 March 1990 (aged 23) Srinagar, J&K, India
- Party: JKLF
- Education: Tyndale Biscoe School
- Alma mater: Sri Pratap College; University of Kashmir

Ashfaq Majeed Wani (5 September 1966 – 30 March 1990) was the first Commander in Chief of the Jammu Kashmir Liberation Front, a militant Kashmiri-separatist group in Jammu and Kashmir, India. He was killed by Indian Paramilitary Forces in 1990 at the age of 24. He was involved in the kidnapping of Rubiya Sayed, daughter of Mufti Mohammed Sayeed, the then Home Minister of India.

== Biography ==
Ashfaq Majeed Wani was born on 5 September 1966 in the Sarai Balla area of Srinagar, Jammu and Kashmir, India into a Kashmiri Muslim family of the Wani clan. He studied at Tyndale Biscoe School and later went to Sri Pratap College and the University of Kashmir. When he was a teenager, sports were an important part of his life. He was a dedicated soccer player, a marathon runner, and a table tennis player, winning first prize in the interstate marathon tournament in 1985 and being selected to represent the state. "The Iranian revolution had left an indelible mark on him, after studying the literature about it. It had become a motif of resistance to him. Besides, he had become very disillusioned with the political scenario prevailing at the time, which favoured the Indian suzerainty. He viewed the accession to India as a "yoke of slavery", said his father. His mother recalled "The Principal of the Biscoe School summoned us one day and informed that even though Ashfaq was a brilliant student and an athlete of repute, he possessed leanings quite uncommon in teenagers".

At the age of 14, Wani refused to accompany his family members in the funeral procession of Sheikh Abdullah, an early sign of what was to form a part of his ideology. Two years later he began organizing anti-India rallies. By 1987, he was already on the radar of Indian intelligence agencies. He was arrested on 23 March 1987 for his involvement with the Muslim United Front, which took part in elections, was imprisoned at the Central Jail, Srinagar. Hundreds of other opposition activists have also arrested in police crackdowns across Indian state of Jammu & Kashmir. He was released on parole after nine months, to attend his uncle's wedding. His period in prison had made him bitter and he was found to have cigarette burns all over his body. After his release, Wani worked on the plans towards the procurement of arms from Pakistan-administered Kashmir. A day before he left for Pakistan-administered Kashmir while serving meals at the wedding reception, he overheard Mohiuddin Shah, a veteran National Conference politician talking about the futility of agitations against the government. Wani is known to have reprimanded him in these words "the government made two grave mistakes as far as Kashmir is concerned. First, they acceded to India and secondly, they let me on parole."

Wani subsequently crossed into Azad Kashmir to obtain arms training under the supervision of the Pakistan Army. Many Kashmiris in the valley joined JKLF and obtained training and financial support in Pakistan and in Azad Kashmir. Most returned to Indian Kashmir and the majority of them were killed by the Indian Army and Indian Paramilitary forces.

Growing up in the Sarai Balla lanes of Srinagar city, Wani, was a science student studying at Shri Pratap Higher Secondary School, when he founded Islamic Students League with the help of other like-minded friends. Soon, he rose up in his circle and became area commander of Jammu Kashmir Liberation Front in 1988. Often refused to take refuge inside houses he would sleep inside pipes at Idgah on many occasions.

== Death ==
Wani was killed at the age of 23, in an encounter with Indian paramilitary troops and an army unit in the Hawwal area of the old city Srinagar on 30 March 1990.

== Bibliography ==
- Jamal, Arif (2009), Shadow War: The Untold Story of Jihad in Kashmir, Melville House, ISBN 978-1-933633-59-6
- Joshi, Manoj (1999), The Lost Rebellion, Penguin Books, ISBN 978-0-14-027846-0
- Swami, Praveen (2007), India, Pakistan and the Secret Jihad: The covert war in Kashmir, 1947–2004, Asian Security Studies, Routledge, ISBN 978-0-415-40459-4
