= Qazi Yasir =

Kashmiri political leader

Qazi Ahmed Yasir is a Kashmiri political leader, the suspended Mirwaiz of southern Kashmir and a renowned scholar.

== Life ==
Yasir's family finds its roots in the times of Kashmiri ruler Yusuf Shah Chak. His grandfather founded J&K Tableegh ul Islam in southern Kashmir. His father, Dr. Qazi Nisar, was one of the greatest scholars of South Asia. He founded the Islamic Research Institute in 1985; the institute produces at least fifty Islamic preachers and scholars every year. Dr. Qazi Nisar was also the founder of MUF.

Yasir was born in 1984 in South Kashmir's township, Anantnag, and pursued his primary education there in a local school, Hanfiya High School. At an early age of 9 years he was arrested by Indian Army and interrogated. After his father, Dr. Qazi Nisar died in 1994, he was titled as the head preacher of South Kashmir by Mufti Rasheed.

He went to Al Jamiat Ul Ashrafiya to receive Islamic education and stayed there for six years. He moved to Aligarh Muslim University, where he completed his graduation in Islamic Studies and also received his master's degree in Islamic studies.

Yasir returned to Kashmir Valley in 2006, and in April 2007, he led a hunger strike against a wine shop in the district that had been opened near two educational institutes. The wine shop was shut down after four days of the hunger strike. In 2008, he led the agitation in Southern Kashmir against SASB He was messiah like figure for Islamic terrorists of Kashmir. In 2009 he raised a fatwa in favour of stone throwing.

In the summer of 2010, the valley again saw an uprising and Yasir as the lone leader in this southern town. He also called for a social boycott with the local police.

== Arrests ==
In 2004, he returned to the valley to find himself arrested when he was scheduled to address a pro-freedom group at Seer, a village in southern Kashmir. He was arrested and sent to Central Jail Srinagar for two weeks, along with five of his associates. The same year during his vacations, he was arrested one more time, when many teenagers were arrested for their alleged involvement in militant activities.

He was arrested again in 2008, but he was released after public outrage. Again in 2010 he was booked under PSA for 17 months and lodged in Kot Bhalwal Jammu. He was released and arrested again in 2012 for one month, and in 2013 for two months.

Mirwaiz Qazi Ahmed Yasir and Ummat e Islami worked for relief and rehabilitation operations during the catastrophic floods that hit the state. The area of operation though remained confined to Southern Kashmir. In 2015, he was arrested several times and he also challenged the government openly on the controversial "beef ban" Mirwaiz Yasir. In the same year, he laid the foundation of Khyri Aam Trust which provides food and Langar services for the poor and provides financial assistance to the downtrodden. He was given less or no space to perform his religious and social duties and was put behind bars constantly.

In 2016, Mirwaiz Qazi Yasir was arrested for a span of more than 4 months. During this time Ummat e Islami launched a massive relief operation and distributed relief in the curfew bound parts of Kashmir valley that had shut after the killing of Burhan wani on July 8, 2016. During this workers of Ummat e Islami's relief wing were arrested by Jammu Kashmir Police.

After his release in November 2016, Mirwaiz Qazi yasir became more militant in his approach towards the Pro Freedom struggle. His activities remained cornered around visiting the houses of Militants and the victims of the conflict at a large. During this time, it was also said that Qazi Yasir was providing support to local Militant groups.

== Downfall ==
In 2018, a video surfaced on social media showing Qazi Yasir in an "obscene" video. As these charges appeared, Yasir was suspended as the Mirwaiz of south Kashmir.

But Yasir has remained chairman of Ummat e Islami, his own party. Many attribute this episode as the downfall of Yasir, derided as Digital Moulvi.

He was elected as the Chairman of Bazm-e-Qadriya, after the demise of Haji Mohammed Abdullah Qadri.

On August 17, 2020, Qazi Yasir along with hundreds of youth held a protest against “blasphemous” remarks on Muhammad.

== Contributions ==
- Demanded release of political prisoners
- Laid foundation stone of house destroyed in gunfight
- Held a demonstration in support of the 8 year old rape Victim Asifa at Jamia Masjid in Islamabad area of South Kashmir.
- Raised voice against the harassments in Shopian district allegedly by the armed forces.
