= Amanullah Khan (JKLF) =

Kashmiri separatist, founder of the Jammu and Kashmir Liberation Front

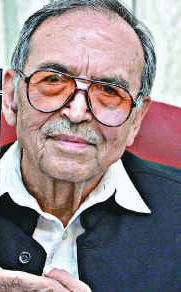

Personal details
- Born: 24 August 1934 Astore, Jammu and Kashmir, British India (present-day Gilgit−Baltistan)
- Died: 26 April 2016 (aged 81) Rawalpindi, Punjab, Pakistan
- Party: Jammu Kashmir Liberation Front
- Education: Sindh Madressatul Islam College, Karachi

Amanullah Khan (24 August 1934 – 26 April 2016) was the founder of the Jammu and Kashmir Liberation Front (JKLF), a Kashmiri militant activist group that advocates independence for the entire Kashmir region. Khan's JKLF initiated the ongoing armed insurgency in Indian-administered Kashmir with backing from Pakistan's Inter-Services Intelligence, which lasted until Pakistan dropped its support of secular Kashmiri separatists in favour of pro-Pakistan Islamist groups, such as the Hizbul Mujahideen. In 1994, the JKLF in the Kashmir Valley, under the leadership of Yasin Malik, renounced militancy in favour of a political struggle. Amanullah Khan disagreed with the strategy, causing a split in the JKLF.

== Early life ==
Amanullah Khan was born on 24 August 1934 in the hamlet of Pari Shang in the Astore District of the princely state of Jammu and Kashmir (present day Gilgit-Baltistan). His father, Jumma Khan died when he was three years old. Khan was relocated to Kupwara in the Kashmir Valley to live with his brother-in-law Hashmat Ali Khan. He went to primary school locally and secondary school in Handwara.

Khan completed the matriculation exam in 1950, where he is said to have scored the highest marks among Muslim students. He subsequently received an admission to the Sri Pratap College in Srinagar with the help of National Conference leader Maulana Masoodi, who also provided him space to stay at the Mujahid Manzil, the National Conference headquarters. Afterwards, he joined the Amar Singh College.

In 1947, the state of Jammu and Kashmir came to be divided between India and Pakistan, with the Kashmir Valley being under Indian control and Khan's native place of Astore being under Pakistani control. Khan was a staunch supporter of Pakistan and became active in student politics. His anti-India protests came under the scanner of the Sheikh Abdullah administration in the Valley and a series of FIRs were registered. Eventually, when Khan held a protest after the assassination of Pakistani prime minister Liaquat Ali Khan, he was served a deportation order. He drove to Jammu and from there crossed into Sialkot in January 1952.

Khan attempted to get into the Garden College in Rawalpindi, but was refused admission since his former college in Jammu and Kashmir was not recognized there. He subsequently enrolled in the Edwards College in Peshawar but was soon expelled due to trouble with the college principal. Finally, he enrolled in the Sindh Madressatul Islam University in Karachi and graduated in 1957, obtaining a degree in law in 1962.

== Activism ==
=== Azad Kashmir ===
By 1962, Amanullah Khan became an advocate of reunification of the former princely state of Jammu and Kashmir and complete independence from both India and Pakistan. He started a monthly magazine called "Voice of Kashmir" reflecting his ideology. Jointly with G. M. Lone, a member of the Azad Kashmir State Council, he established the Kashmir Independence Committee, which lobbied the Azad Jammu and Kashmir government to take a more active role in Indian-administered Kashmir. In 1964, Khan was elected as the Secretary General of the Azad Kashmir Plebiscite Front, inspired by the Jammu Kashmir Plebiscite Front started by Mirza Afzal Beg in Indian-administered Kashmir. Subsequently, in April 1965, the Kashmir Independence Committee was merged into the Azad Kashmir Plebiscite Front.

The Jammu Kashmir National Liberation Front (NLF) was an offshoot of the Plebiscite Front, established by Khan and Maqbool Bhat around August 1965 for carrying out armed insurgency in the Indian-controlled Kashmir. Armed operations were started in November 1965, shortly after the failed Indo-Pakistani War of 1965. Maqbool Bhat and Mir Ahmad entered the Kashmir Valley attempting to recruit members. They were compromised and ended up killing a police official. Captured and sentenced to death, Bhat nevertheless escaped from prison and made it back to Azad Kashmir. In Pakistan, he was accused of being an Indian spy and imprisoned. Amanullah Khan was also imprisoned for 15 months in a Gilgit prison during 1970–72, accused of being an Indian agent. He was released after protests broke out in Gilgit. Thirteen of his colleagues were sentenced to 14 years in prison, but released after a year. Khan was also tried in absentia in Srinagar, where he was accused of being an agent of Pakistan.

Further attempts by the NLF to infiltrate into Indian-controlled Kashmir met with failure. Journalist Praveen Swami states that the organisation did not have enough funds and infrastructure, or support from other sources, to make an impact inside Indian Kashmir. Paul Staniland adds that "State repression" in the Indian Kashmir also played a key role.

=== United Kingdom ===
In the mid-1970s, with the organisation having fallen apart and the key leaders in jail, Amanullah Khan left Pakistan for the United Kingdom (UK). The British Mirpuris, many of whom had been displaced by the construction of the Mangla Dam, extended enthusiastic support. The UK chapter of the Plebiscite Front was converted into the Jammu and Kashmir Liberation Front (JKLF) in May 1977 and formed an armed wing called the `National Liberation Army'. Amanullah Khan took charge as the General Secretary of JKLF the following February. JKLF opened branches in various countries in Europe and the Middle East as well as the US, and held well-attended conventions in Birmingham in 1981 and Luton in 1982.

Praveen Swami states that the JKLF made plans to bomb the March 1983 conference of non-aligned meeting in New Delhi and to hijack an airliner from New Delhi, both of which were aborted. After the arrival of Hashim Qureshi in the UK in January 1984, another hijacking was planned. However, on 3 February 1984, members of the National Liberation Army kidnapped the Indian diplomat Ravindra Mhatre in Birmingham and demanded the release of Maqbool Bhat as ransom. Amanullah Khan was named as the interlocuter. Unfortunately, the kidnappers panicked at the possibility of a police raid and, allegedly upon Amanullah Khan's instructions, shot the diplomat. India executed Maqbool Bhat six days later. A British court convicted two members of the JKLF for the killing of Mhatre. Hashim Quresi and Amanullah Khan were expelled from the UK.

=== Pakistan ===
Amanullah Khan returned to Pakistan in December 1986, establishing the JKLF headquarters in Muzaffarabad. Pakistan under Zia ul-Haq, which was already supporting Khalistani militants in Punjab, was ready to support insurgency in Kashmir, and Khan was ready to work with the Pakistan's Inter-Services Intelligence (ISI). Following the rigged State election in Jammu and Kashmir in 1987, the disaffected youth of the Kashmir Valley started crossing the Line of Control to Azad Jammu and Kashmir to obtain arms and training. Khan's JKLF was their natural destination. Staniland states that the JKLF was "reborn" in the Indian-administered Kashmir in this period. It was led by young activists from Srinagar and its environs, the so-called `HAJY' group. The enormity of popular support received for their call for independence surprised them. Within two years, the JKLF in the Valley emerged as the "vanguard and spearhead of a popular uprising" against the Indian state.

However, a pro-independence JKLF was not in Pakistan's interest. Pakistan accepted the collaboration with JKLF only as a "necessary compromise," because of the recognition that Islamist groups had very little currency in the Kashmir Valley. However, cadres of Islamist groups were also trained in JKLF training camps in Azad Jammu and Kashmir. This quickly led to a dilution of the JKLF's nationalist ideology. Independence and Islam became interchangeable slogans. The Islamist attacks on Kashmiri Pandits, liberal women, liquor shops and beauty parlours were never condemned by the JKLF. According to Hasim Qureshi such outrages were "official Pakistan policy" and the policy was endorsed by the Islamic Right as well as Amanullah Khan's JKLF. "The ISI ran this movement on communal lines right from the beginning," says Qureshi, "and for that Amanullah and his underlings became its agents."

By 1992, the majority of the JKLF militants were killed or captured and they were yielding ground to pro-Pakistan guerilla groups such as the Hizb-ul-Mujahideen, strongly promoted by the Pakistani military authorities. Further encroachment by pan-Islamist fighters infiltrating into the Valley from Pakistan changed the colour of the insurgency. Pakistan ceased its financial support to the JKLF because of its pro-independence ideology.

Yasin Malik, the JKLF leader in the Valley, renounced violence in 1994 and declared an "indefinite ceasefire." Malik's peaceful struggle was unacceptable to Amanullah Khan, who removed him as the president of JKLF. In return, Malik expelled Khan from the chairmanship. Thus JKLF had split into two factions. The Pakistan government recognised Yasin Malik as the leader of JKLF, which further complicated the situation.

Ellis and Khan state that, during the Azad Jammu and Kashmir elections in 1996, JKLF commanded more support than all the traditional parties, even though it was not allowed to contest elections due to its pro-Independence stance.

The two branches of JKLF reunited in 2011. Although Khan supported armed resistance, he never picked up arms himself.

== Writings ==
Khan has written two books, namely "Free Kashmir" (English), and "My Autobiography" (in Urdu). He has also written about three dozen booklets and pamphlets in English and Urdu about various aspects of the Kashmir issue. He has visited over twenty countries to lobby for his cause, including attending the UN General Assembly and held many press conferences there. Khan stated that he was not an enemy of the people or the state of India or Pakistan but only of the governmental machinery which has kept his motherland under subjugation and of those politicians who deny Kashmiris their inherent and pledged right of self-determination.

== Personal life ==
Amanullah Khan has only one child, a daughter named Asma who married Sajjad Ghani Lone, the son of Abdul Ghani Lone, Chairman of Jammu and Kashmir People's Conference in November 2000. She is based in Srinagar and writes about different aspects of the Kashmir Issues and regional geo-political issues.

Khan died on 26 April 2016 at a hospital from chronic obstructive pulmonary disease in Rawalpindi, Pakistan, aged 82. Yasin Malik paid him a rich tribute, calling him "a pioneer of the freedom struggle, a herald of an independent Jammu Kashmir, a glowing example of persistence, ... a leader who, from his youth till the last breath, remained steadfast in the resistance movement."

== See also ==
- Hurriyat and Problems before Plebiscite
- Kashmir conflict
- 2014 Jammu and Kashmir Legislative Assembly election
