= Rape and murder of Girija Tickoo =

1990 murder in Jammu and Kashmir, India

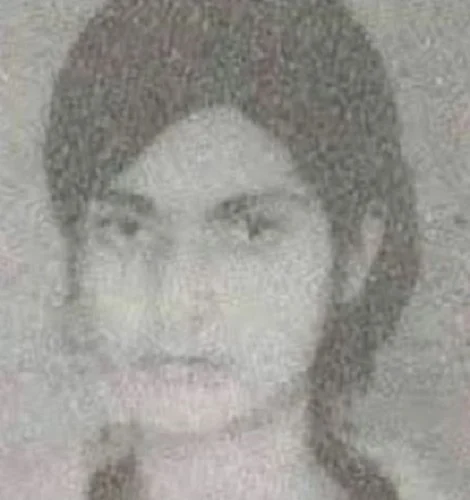
- Girija Tickoo in her younger days
- Location: 34.5246°N 74.2596°E; Kupwara, Jammu and Kashmir, India
- Date: 19 June 1990–25 June 1990
- Target: Girija Tickoo
- Attack type: Abduction, sexual assault (rape), torture and murder
- Victim: Girija Tickoo
- Perpetrator: militants of the Kashmir insurgency
- Motive: Targeted militant violence against Kashmiri Hindus

In June 1990, Girija Tickoo, (Note: Girija also spelled Girja, Tickoo also spelled Tikoo and Tiku.) a 28-year-old Kashmiri Hindu woman was gang raped and murdered by Muslim militants during the insurgency in Jammu and Kashmir. Originally from Bandipora, Tickoo worked at a government school in Kupwara, from where was abducted on 19 June, gang raped and then sawed alive by her captors. Her dismembered body was found on 25 June. She had earlier fled the Kashmir Valley during the forced displacement of Kashmiri Hindus due to threats and violence of the insurgency. She had returned to collect a paycheque when she was abducted.

== Background ==
Girija Tickoo was born on 15 February 1969, was married to Kanya Lal Tiku and had a son age 5 and daughter age 2, and lived at Arigam (Aragam) in Bandipora district (then Baramulla district). She worked at a Government High School in Trehgam, Kupwara, and belonged to Bandipora. Tickoo belonged to the Kashmiri Hindu community, and had migrated to Jammu along with her family sometime in early 1990 during the forced displacement of Kashmiri Hindus from the insurgency-hit Kashmir Valley due to threats and targeted violence by militants. In June, she had returned to collect a paycheque, and was staying with a former colleague.

== Abduction, rape and murder ==
Tickoo returned to her colleague's house after collecting her paycheque, following which she was abducted by a group of militants. She was gang raped and tortured by the militants. She is said to have recognised the voice of one of her rapists. She was later taken to a wood processing unit (sawmill) where she was cut into two using a mechanical saw by the militants.

== Public attention ==
The case was raised during hearings held by the United States Commission on International Religious Freedom in September 2000. Vijay K. Sazawal, representing the Indo-American Kashmir Forum, included Tickoo's killing in testimony concerning violence against Kashmiri Hindus. The case received renewed public attention through testimony before human-rights bodies in the United States. In 2019, columnist Sunanda Vashisht while testifying at a hearing entitled “Jammu and Kashmir in Context” to the Tom Lantos Human Rights Commission of the United States House of Representatives submitted a testimony that Tickoo "was abducted, blind folded, gang raped and when she identified the perpetrators by their voice, because they belonged to the same neighborhood as she had lived all her life in, she was cut into two halves on a mechanical saw." During a debate in the Lok Sabha in August 2023, Union minister Smriti Irani referred to the deaths of Tickoo and Sarla Bhat while responding to opposition leader Rahul Gandhi.

== Cultural depictions ==
The incident was recounted in the memoir Our Moon Has Blood Clots (2013) by Rahul Pandita. The incident was incorporated into the storyline of The Kashmir Files, a 2022 film directed by Vivek Agnihotri based on the displacement of Kashmiri Hindus, with Bhasha Sumbli portraying a character whose killing was partially based on that of Tickoo's.

== See also ==
- Murder and rape of Sarla Bhat

== Bibliography ==
- Balcerowicz, Piotr; Kuszewska, Agnieszka (2022), Kashmir in India and Pakistan Policies, Routledge
- Koul, Mohan Lal (1996), Kashmir: Wail of a Valley (Mohan Lal Koul's 1996 compilation of Kashmiri Pandit victims records) (PDF), Gyan Sagar Publications, pp. 40–109
  - Koul, Mohan Lal (1999), Kashmir, Wail of a Valley: Atrocity and Terror, Gyan Sagar Publications
- Vohra, Anupama; Singh, Jasbir (2025), "Revisiting the Kashmir Conflict through Rahul Pandita's Our Moond Has Blood Clots: Violence, Exodus and Loss", in Stefanelli, Maria Anita; Skórzynska, Izabela (eds.), Scars of War: Migration, Security and Sustainable Future, Emerald Publishing Limited
