= Kidnapping of Rubaiya Sayeed =

1989 kidnapping by the Jammu Kashmir Liberation Front

- Location: Srinagar, India
- Date: 8 December 1989; 3:45 p.m.
- Attack type: Kidnapping
- Victim: Rubaiya Sayeed
- Perpetrators: Kashmiri separatist militants, members of the Jammu Kashmir Liberation Front
- Motive: Release of five jailed members of the Jammu Kashmir Liberation Front

In 1989, Rubaiya Sayeed, the daughter of the then Indian Home Minister Mufti Mohammad Sayeed, was kidnapped by Kashmiri separatist militants in Srinagar, the capital of Jammu and Kashmir. The kidnappers demanded the release of five jailed members of Jammu Kashmir Liberation Front (JKLF) in exchange for Sayeed's release. The Indian government headed by V. P. Singh of the Janata Dal party, with outside support from the BJP and leftist parties, agreed to the demands and induced the state government to release the jailed militants. In 2004, the JKLF admitted to having carried out the kidnapping, and the court case is ongoing. In July 2022, Rubaiya identified Yasin Malik, one of the key leaders of JKLF at that time, as one of her kidnappers.

== Rubaiya Sayeed ==
Rubaiya Sayeed, the third daughter of Mufti Mohammad Sayeed was then 23 years old, and a medical intern at Lal Ded Memorial Women's Hospital.

== Modus operandi ==
She was kidnapped at 3:45 p.m. on 8 December 1989, about 500 metres from her home at Nowgam when she was returning from the Lal Ded Memorial Women's Hospital in a local mini bus. Four people forced her out of the vehicle at gunpoint into a waiting Maruti car and disappeared. The kidnapping was done by J K Liberation Front run by Yasin Malik (A Kashmiri separatist terrorist).

== Demands of abductors and negotiations ==
Representatives of the Jammu and Kashmir Liberation Front telephoned the local newspaper Kashmir Times at about 5:30 p.m., stating that their group's mujahideen had Ghulam Nabi Butt, younger brother of the convicted and hanged terrorist Maqbool Butt; Noor Muhammad Kalwal; Muhammed Altaf; and Mushtaq Ahmed Zargar.

The editor, Muhammad Sofi, phoned both the Home Minister and the government to pass on the news. The chief minister Farooq Abdullah cut short his holiday in London and returned to Delhi. Senior IB and police officials, including Ved Marwah, Director General of the National Security Guards, reached Srinagar before dawn the next day.

The negotiations opened through Zaffar Meraj of the Kashmir Times, while Shabnam Lone, daughter of A.B. Ghani Lone and Maulvi Abbas Ansari of the Muslim United Front were tapped as possible channels. Later, a judge of the Allahabad High Court, Moti Lal Bhat, entered the picture. A friend of Mufti, he began negotiating directly with the militants on behalf of the home minister.

At 3:30 a.m. on 13 December 1989, two Union Cabinet Ministers, Inder Kumar Gujral and Arif Mohammad Khan, personally flew into Srinagar, believing that Farooq was coming in the way of a deal because Farooq held the view that abject surrender to the militants' demands would open the floodgates.

At 7:00 p.m. on 13 December 1989 Dr. Rubaiya Sayeed was set free, two hours after the government released the five jailed militants. Thousands of young men gathered at Rajouri Kadal (Razey Kadal) to take them out in a triumphant procession, but they quickly disappeared to their hideouts.

== Aftermath ==
Years later Farooq Abdullah claimed that his government was threatened with dismissal by the central government if the militants were not exchanged for Rubaiya. The kidnapping set the stage for heightened militancy in the state, and the mass support for militants could be clearly seen in the streets. Many say the abduction was the watershed in the Kashmir insurgency. Had the V P Singh government not buckled down, things would have been different," they say, "The JKLF would not have harmed Rubaiya due to public sentiment. In 1999 three JKLF militants Shoukat Ahmed Bakshi, Manzoor Ahmed Sofi, and Mohammad Iqbal Gandroo were granted bail after 9 years.

Yasin Malik is currently under trial for the kidnapping and exchange of five militants.

== See also ==
- List of kidnappings
- Mufti Mohammad Sayeed
- Mushtaq Ahmed Zargar
