= Murder of Ravindra Mhatre =

1984 diplomatic killing in the United Kingdom

Ravindra Mhatre
- Born: 1936
- Died: 6 February 1984 (aged 47–48); Birmingham, United Kingdom
- Cause of death: Murder

Ravindra Hareshwar Mhatre was a 48 year old Indian diplomat in the United Kingdom who was kidnapped and later killed in Birmingham in 1984 by British Kashmiri militants who were associated with the Jammu Kashmir Liberation Front.

== Abduction and killing ==
Ravindra Mhatre, a second-ranking official in India's consular office in Birmingham, was abducted in Birmingham as he stepped out of a bus, carrying a birthday cake for his daughter Asha. He was held captive for three days in the Alum Rock neighborhood of Birmingham, an area that was predominantly inhabited by British Mirpuris.

According to a police spokesman, Mhatre's body was found two days later in a farm lane about 20 miles southeast of Birmingham. The Jammu Kashmir Liberation Front claimed responsibility and demanded a ransom of 1 million pounds ($1.84 million) and the release of militants imprisoned in India.

The kidnapping was a failed attempt to secure the release from prison of the Jammu Kashmir Liberation Front's founder Maqbool Bhat. A £1m ransom demand was sent to media outlets.

== Perpetrators ==
Mohammed Riaz and Abdul Quayyam Raja, then 27, were convicted of the murder of Mhatre. A third suspect, then aged 21 was arrested and imprisoned for 20 years until 2004.

Abdul Quayyam Raja was arrested and indicted in Birmingham in February 1984.

Mohammad Aslam Mirza, 48, a British citizen and Jammu and Kashmir Liberation Front (JKLF) militant, was arrested in 2004 in the United States for overstaying his visa. Fingerprints revealed that he was a member of the JKLF, and fingerprints on the gun used to murder Mhatre revealed that he was wanted for the kidnap and murder of Mhatre. Mirza told the court he was not involved in the murder and said that he was appalled by the charges and had no recollection of the events of 1984 due to severe memory problems. He told the court that after the killing he had gone to Kashmir on family business.

Mirza had left his wife Sakina Bibi and seven children in Birmingham and left for Pakistan in 1984. He married Ann Aslam in Pottsville, Pennsylvania, in 2001, and managed a Pottsville apartment complex.

On 1 December 2005, a jury found Mirza not guilty.

== Impact and commemoration ==
The People's Justice Party, supported by Mirpuri Pakistanis in the UK grew out of the campaign to get Mhatre's killers released. The original movement, called FRAQ - "Free Riaz and Quayyam" – campaign, later changed to "Justice for Kashmir", then the "Justice Party", before settling on its final name.

A bridge in the Indian city of Pune popularly known as Mhatre Bridge is named after him.
