= Yasin Malik =

Kashmiri separatist leader (born 1966)

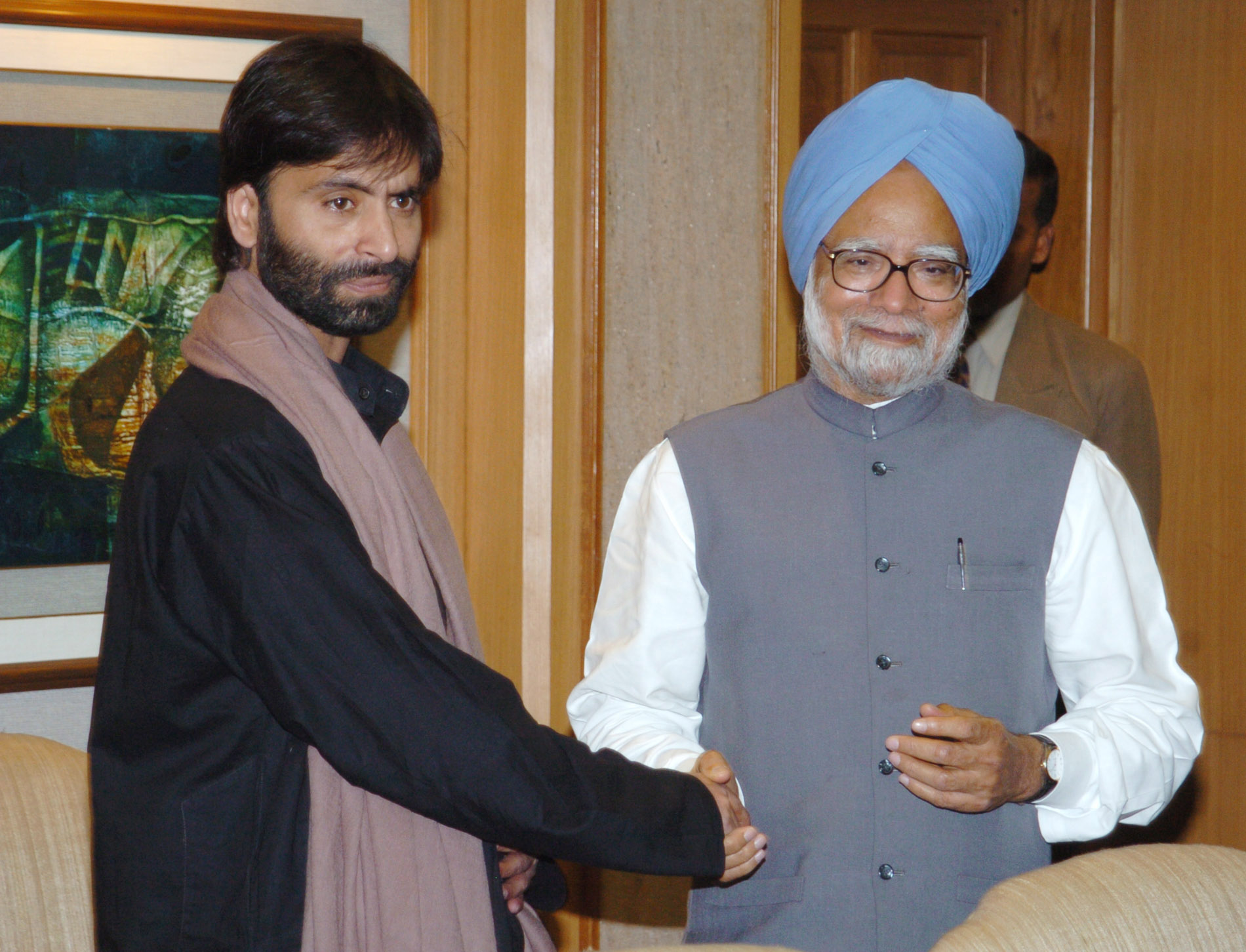
- Malik (left) in 2006, with then-Indian Prime Minister Manmohan Singh
- Born: 3 April 1966 (age 60); Srinagar, Jammu and Kashmir, India
- Education: Sri Pratap College
- Office: Chairman of Jammu Kashmir Liberation Front
- Spouse: Mushaal Hussein Mullick (m. 2009)
- Children: 1
- Convictions: 6 Counts (Note: Being a member of a terrorist gang or organisation; Terrorist act; Raising funds for the terrorist act; Conspiracy to commit terrorist act; Criminal conspiracy; sedition)
- Penalty: Life imprisonment

Details
- Date apprehended: 6 July 2018

Yasin Malik (born 3 April 1966) is a Kashmiri separatist leader and former militant who advocates the separation of Kashmir from both India and Pakistan. He is the chairman of the Jammu Kashmir Liberation Front, which was the first militant to spearheaded armed militancy in the Kashmir Valley. Malik claims he renounced violence in 1994 on insistence of Indian officials, and adopted peaceful methods to come to a settlement of the Kashmir conflict. In May 2022, Malik pleaded guilty to multiple charges of criminal conspiracy and waging war against the state, and was sentenced to life imprisonment. In June 2026, the state police's investigation agency implicated Malik of commanding the 1990 murder and rape of Sarla Bhat.

== Early life ==
Yasin Malik was born on 3 April 1966 in the densely populated Maisuma locality of Srinagar. His father Ghulam Qadir Malik (1937–2012) died due to a cardiac arrest on 14 May 2012, while Yasin was on a visit to Pakistan. He has three sisters, including Amina Malik who has advocated for better prisoner's rights for Malik at the Tihar Jail.

Malik states that, as a young boy, he had witnessed violence carried out on the streets by the security forces. In 1980, after witnessing an altercation between the army and taxi drivers, he is said to have become a rebel. He formed a party called the Tala Party, which formed a revolutionary front, printing and distributing political materials and causing disturbances. His group was involved in attempting to disrupt the 1983 cricket match with West Indies in the Sher-i-Kashmir Stadium, disturbing National Conference gatherings in Srinagar and protesting Maqbool Bhat's execution. Malik was arrested and detained for four months.

After getting released in 1986, the Tala Party was renamed the Islamic Students League (ISL), with Malik as the general secretary. The ISL became an important youth movement. Among its members were Ashfaq Majeed Wani, Javed Mir and Abdul Hameed Sheikh. (Note: Other members were Mushtaq Ul Islam, Abdullah Bangroo, Ajaz Dar, Showkat Bakshi, Mehmood Sagar, Iqbal Gandroo, Noor Mohammad Kalwal, Firdous Shah, Shakeel Bakshi and Hilal A. War.) They were drawn to the Jamaat leader of the Srinagar district, Maulvi Mohammad Yusuf Shah, whose Friday sermons were said to have been a favourite of the youth.

== Politics ==
In the run up to the Legislative Assembly elections in 1987, the Islamic Students League led by Yasin Malik joined the Muslim United Front (MUF). It did not contest any seats because it did not believe in the constitution. But it took responsibility for campaigning for the MUF in all Srinagar constituencies. According to a spokesman of the Jamaat-e-Islami, all the parties that joined in the MUF were either pro-independence or pro-self-determination. According to another Jamaat member, the ISL was recruited into the MUF to provide "street power" to counter the "hooliganism" of the National Conference, the ruling party.

Malik campaigned for the Jamaat candidate Mohammad Yusuf Shah (part of MUF) who stood for the 1987 elections from Amirakadal, Srinagar. Scholar Sumantra Bose states that, as the vote counting began, it became clear that Yusuf Shah was winning by a landslide. However, the opposing National Conference candidate Ghulam Mohiuddin Shah was declared the winner. Yusuf Shah as well as Malik were arrested by the Jammu and Kashmir Police and imprisoned until the end of 1987 without a formal charge, court appearance or a trial. Widespread rigging and "booth-capturing" in the elections were reported, which, were reportedly carried out by the National Conference leader Farooq Abdullah in connivance with the Government of India. The police refused to listen to any complaint. The National Conference–Congress alliance was declared the winner with 62 seats in the Assembly, and formed the government.

The rigged election of 1987 is seen by most scholars as the trigger for Kashmir insurgency. Malik disagrees by saying, "Let me clear it, rigging in 1987 elections didn't result in armed militancy. We were there even before 1987."

== Militancy ==
After release from prison, Malik crossed over to the Pakistan-administered Kashmir to receive training at camps situated there. Pakistan's secret service ISI had struck deal with Jammu and Kashmir Liberation Front (JKLF) in 1986 to support the launching of an insurgency in Indian-administered Kashmir. This is believed to have been a short-term expedient for ISI to spur the Jamaat-e-Islami Kashmir into action.

Malik returned to the Kashmir Valley as a core member of the JKLF, declaring his goal as the independence for the entirety of the former princely state of Jammu and Kashmir. Malik, along with Hamid Sheikh, Ashfaq Wani and Javed Ahmad Mir, formed the core group—dubbed the "HAJY" group—of the JKLF militants returning with arms and training received in Pakistan-administered Kashmir. They received an enthusiastic response to their call for independence in the Kashmir Valley. They waged a guerrilla war with the Indian security forces, kidnapping Rubiya Sayeed, the daughter of Indian Home Minister Mufti Mohammad Sayeed, and targeting attacks on the government and security officials.

By 1990, JKLF was out of favour with Pakistan. The pro-Pakistan Islamist militant group Hizbul Mujahideen had been formed in the Valley and the Jamaat-e-Islami Kashmir agreed to sponsor it. Pakistan cut off JKLF's funding in early 1990. In March 1990, Ashfaq Wani was killed in a battle with Indian security forces. In August 1990, Yasin Malik was captured in a wounded condition. He was imprisoned until May 1994. Hamid Sheikh was also captured in 1992 but released by the Border Security Force to counteract the pro-Pakistan guerrillas. By 1992, the majority of the JKLF militants were killed or captured and they were yielding ground to pro-Pakistan guerilla groups such as the Hizbul Mujahideen, strongly promoted by the Pakistani military authorities. Further encroachment by pan-Islamist fighters infiltrating into the Valley from Pakistan changed the colour of the insurgency.

After release from prison on bail in May 1994, Malik declared an indefinite ceasefire of the JKLF. However, he says that JKLF still lost a hundred activists to Indian operations. Independent journalists mentioned three hundred activists were killed. Hizb-ul-Mujahideen members often informed their whereabouts to the Indian security forces in order to decimate the JKLF field presence.

Malik renounced violence and adopted a Gandhian non-violent struggle for independence. He expressed a desire for a "democratic approach" involving the "true representatives" of Jammu and Kashmir. He offered political negotiations, but insisted that they must be tripartite with both Indian and Pakistani governments, and should cover the entire state of Jammu and Kashmir. This was not acceptable to the Indian government. In the Spring of 1995, Malik protested the holding of Legislative Assembly elections and threatened to immolate himself. He contended that the Indian government has "thrust this election process" on the Kashmiris just as a display of democracy.

Malik's peaceful struggle was unacceptable to the leadership of JKLF in Pakistan-administered Kashmir. At the end of 1995, Amanullah Khan, the founder chairman of JKLF, removed Malik as the president of JKLF. In return, Malik expelled Khan from chairmanship. Thus JKLF had split into two factions. Victoria Schofield states that the Pakistan government recognised Yasin Malik as the leader of JKLF, which further complicated the situation.

== Recent developments ==
In October 1999, Malik was arrested by Indian Authorities under the Jammu and Kashmir Public Safety Act (PSA) and was again arrested on 26 March 2002 under the Indian Prevention of Terrorism Act (POTA); he was detained for almost a year.

Malik has had one-on-one meetings with the president of Pakistan, prime minister of Pakistan, prime Minister of India and other world leaders. In 2007, Malik and his party launched a campaign known as Safar-i-Azadi (Journey of Freedom).

In 2005, a rival faction to Malik's within the JKLF formed a separate organisation "JKLF(R)". Javed Mir is its convener.

In February 2013, Malik shared the dais with the banned Lashker-e-Taiba chief Hafiz Muhammad Saeed at a protest in Islamabad, which was condemned by many commentators, including Muslim bodies.

On 4 December 2013, the JKLF claimed that Malik was thrown out of a hotel in New Delhi with his wife and 18-month-old daughter due to his political ideology of separatism. On 12 January 2016, Yasin Malik wrote a letter to Pakistan Prime Minister Nawaz Sharif, opposing Gilgit-Baltistan's merger with Pakistan.

=== Charges for 1990 attack ===
In March 2020, Malik and six accomplices were charged under the Terrorist and Disruptive Activities (Prevention) Act (TADA), the Arms Act 1959 and Ranbir Penal Code for the attack on 40 Indian Air Force personnel in Rawalpora, Srinagar on 25 January 1990. During the attack four IAF personnel died. Malik was facing trial for the kidnapping of Rubaiyya Sayeed and the subsequent exchange of five militants.

=== 2017 terror funding case ===
In 2017, India's National Investigation Agency (NIA) registered a case of terror funding against various separatist leaders, and named Malik and four others in a charge sheet filed in 2019. (Note: The others named were Shabir Shah, Asiya Andrabi, Masarat Alam Bhat and Engineer Rashid.) The agency charged them with receiving funds from Pakistan to carry out terrorist activities and stone-pelting during the Kashmir unrest, especially in 2010 and 2016.

In March 2022, a Delhi court reviewed the evidence, and ordered framing of charges against Malik and others under the stringent UAPA and Indian Penal Code. The judge observed there was prima facie evidence that the accused were direct recipients of terror funds, mainly from Pakistan, with which they shared goals. The court saw a criminal conspiracy in organising large-scale protests, resulting in violence and arson at a massive scale. It found sufficient evidence against Malik under sections 38 and 39 of UAPA (association with a terrorist organisation and inviting support for the terrorist organisation) with regard to Lashkar-e-Taiba.

On 10 May 2022, Malik pled guilty of the charges framed against him. He chose not to have a lawyer represent him and was appearing for himself. The court appointed an amicus curiae to explain the charges to Malik and make him understand the consequences. Malik confirmed to the amicus that he did not want to contest the charges and that he was ready to face whatever was in store for him.

On 19 May 2022, Malik was convicted by the NIA Court on charges of conspiracy and waging war against the state, and subsequently sentenced to two counts of life imprisonment and five 10-year prison sentences, all to be held concurrently.

Reacting to the court's verdict, Malik's wife Mushaal appealed to the UN, UNHCR and international powers "to take notice of this war crime and save the life of a warrior of his motherland and to stop this grave injustice against Yasin." Pakistan's foreign ministry condemned the sentencing as a "sham trial" and described it as "another abhorrent attempt of the Indian government to deprive the Kashmiri people of their true leadership".

=== Killing of Sarla Bhat ===
In June 2026, the state investigation agency (SIA) of Jammu and Kashmir police accused Malik of commanding the 1990 killing of Sarla Bhat and filed a chargesheet against him and four others at a TADA/POTA court in Srinagar. The SIA had earlier raided the house of several JKLF members, including Malik, in relation to the investigation in 2025. (Note: Others whose houses were raided include former JKLF member Javeed Mir, Peer Noor ul Haq Shah, Reyaz Kabir Sheikh, Bashir Ahmad Gojri, Feroz Ahmad Khan, Kaiser Ahmad Tiploo, and Ghulam Mohammad Taploo.) According to journalist Ahmed Ali Fayyaz, Bhat's killing had coincided with the hospitalisation of Malik at SKIMS, where Bhat worked as a nurse. A note found on her body had accused her of passing information to police that had led to a raid on 8 April 1990 in Srinagar's old town in which an injured Yasin Malik had escaped but some other members of the JKLF had been arrested. According to a 'senior police official', Bhat's murder was related to the arrest of a JKLF affiliated employee at SKIMS, and Bhat was framed as an informant because she was Kashmiri Pandit.

== Personal life ==
In 2009, Malik married Pakistani artist Mushaal Hussein Mullick (b. 1985) in Rawalpindi on 22 February 2009. The two met while Yasin was on a tour of Pakistan in 2005. They became parents to a girl named Raziyah Sultana in March 2012. Mushaal and her daughter currently reside in Islamabad.

Mushaal is a graduate of the London School of Economics. She comes from an affluent Pakistani family, her mother -Rehana Hussein Mullick- was the secretary general of PML-N Women's Wing, while her father -M. A. Hussein Mullick (d. 2002)- was an international economist who headed the University of Bonn's economics department and was the first Pakistani member of a Nobel Prize jury; her brother -Haider Ali Hussein Mullick- is a foreign policy analyst based in Washington, D.C., and is currently a lecturer at the Naval Post Graduate School; and her sister, Sabien Hussein Mullick, is a social worker.

Yasin had completed his graduation from S. P. College in Srinagar and also says that most of his knowledge has been acquired by self-taught methods while he served his time in various jails. Malik loves the poetry of Allama Iqbal and the writings of Imam Ghazali.

== See also ==
- Kashmir conflict
- Murder and rape of Sarla Bhat

== Bibliography ==
- Bhatnagar, Gaurav (2009), "The Islamicization of Politics: Motivations for Violence in Kashmir" (PDF), The Journal of Politics and Society, 20 (1): 1–20
- Bose, Sumantra (2003), Kashmir: Roots of Conflict, Paths to Peace, Harvard University Press, ISBN 0-674-01173-2
- Jamal, Arif (2009), Shadow War: The Untold Story of Jihad in Kashmir, Melville House, ISBN 978-1-933633-59-6
- Riedel, Bruce (2012), Deadly Embrace: Pakistan, America, and the Future of the Global Jihad, Brookings Institution Press, ISBN 978-0-8157-2283-0
- Sirrs, Owen L. (2016), Pakistan's Inter-Services Intelligence Directorate: Covert Action and Internal Operations, Routledge, ISBN 978-1-317-19609-9
- Schofield, Victoria (2003) [First published in 2000], Kashmir in Conflict, London and New York: I. B. Taurus & Co, ISBN 1860648983
- Sidhu, Waheguru Pal Singh; Asif, Bushra; Samii, Cyrus, eds. (2000), Kashmir: New Voices, Nw Approaches, Boulder: Lynne Rienner, ISBN 1588264084
- Sisk, Timothy D. (2009), International Mediation in Civil Wars: Bargaining with Bullets, Routledge, ISBN 978-1-13-402237-3
