= Jammu Kashmir Liberation Front =

Kashmiri separatist organization

- Abbreviation: JKLF
- Leader: Yasin Malik
- Chairman: Yasin Malik; Raja Haq Nawaz (Acting Chairman)
- Founders: Amanullah Khan; Maqbool Bhat
- Founded: 29 May 1977; Birmingham, United Kingdom
- Banned: In India on 22 March 2019
- Split from: Azad Kashmir Plebiscite Front
- Preceded by: National Liberation Front
- Headquarters: Srinagar, Jammu and Kashmir
- Think tank: JKLF Media Cell
- Student wing: Jammu Kashmir Student Liberation Front (JKSLF)
- Youth wing: JKLF Youth Wing
- Women's wing: JKLF Women Wing
- Ideology: Kashmiri nationalism Separatism
- Regional affiliation: All Parties Hurriyat Conference
- International affiliation: Diplomatic Bureau
- Colors: Green Red White

Election symbol
- Maple Leaf

Website
- jklf.org

The Jammu Kashmir Liberation Front (JKLF) is a political separatist organisation active in both the Indian-administered and Pakistani-administered territories of Kashmir. It was founded by Amanullah Khan, with Maqbool Bhat also credited as a co-founder. Originally a militant wing of the Azad Kashmir Plebiscite Front, the organization declared itself an independent organisation in Birmingham, England on 29 May 1977, after which it came to be known as Jammu Kashmir Liberation Front. From then until 1994 it was an active Kashmiri militant organization. The JKLF first established branches in several cities and towns of the United Kingdom and other countries in Europe, as well as in the United States and across the Middle East. In 1982, it established a branch in the Pakistani-administered territory of Azad Jammu and Kashmir, and by 1987, it had established a branch in the Indian-administered Kashmir Valley.

After 1994, the JKLF wing in Indian-administered Kashmir, under the leadership of Kashmiri separatist Yasin Malik, declared an "indefinite ceasefire" and reportedly disbanded its militant wing. Following this, the organization committed itself to a political struggle in order to achieve its objective of independence for the entire region of the former princely state of Jammu and Kashmir from both India and Pakistan. However, the JKLF branch in Azad Jammu and Kashmir did not agree with this change of direction and subsequently split off from the JKLF wing in the Kashmir Valley. In 2005, the two groups merged again, retaining the organization's original identity.

Although the JKLF has only Muslim members, it is secular in theory. It continues to assert that a secular, independent Kashmir—free of both India and Pakistan—is its eventual goal. From the early 1990s, however the secular pro-independence character of the Kashmir insurgency was largely displaced by Pakistan-backed hardline Islamist groups. Despite having received support in the form of weapons and training from the Pakistani military, it regards Pakistan as an 'occupation power' and carries out a political struggle against it in Azad Jammu and Kashmir.

The JKLF in the Kashmir Valley was officially banned by the Indian government under an anti-terror law passed in March 2019—one month after the Pulwama attack by Jaish-e-Mohammed.

== History ==
JKLF was founded by Amanullah Khan in Birmingham in June 1976 from the erstwhile UK chapter of the 'Plebiscite Front'. Maqbool Bhat is often credited as being its co-founder. Khan was born in Gilgit, studied in Srinagar and emigrated to Pakistan in 1952. Bhat was born in Kupwara and also emigrated to Pakistan after studying in Srinagar. The duo had earlier formed Jammu Kashmir National Liberation Front (NLF) in 1965, along with Hashim Qureshi. The group carried out the hijacking of Ganga, an Indian Airlines plane flying from Srinagar to Jammu, in January 1971, and diverted it to Lahore. The Pakistani government returned all the passengers and crew to India, and subsequently tried the hijackers and several members of NLF on charges of being Indian agents. Khan was imprisoned in a Gilgit prison during 1970–72, released after protests broke out. Maqbool Bhat was released in 1974, and he crossed over into the Indian-administered Kashmir where he was arrested in a bank robbery.

Amanullah Khan moved to England, where he received the enthusiastic support of the British Mirpuri community. The UK chapter of the Plebiscite Front was converted into the Jammu and Kashmir Liberation Front (JKLF) in May 1977. It also formed an armed wing called the 'National Liberation Army'. Amanullah Khan took charge as the General Secretary of JKLF the following February. With the active support of the British Mirpuris, the group expanded rapidly, setting up branches in Pakistan, Denmark, Holland, Germany, France, Saudi Arabia, United Arab Emirates and the United States. It organised well-attended conventions in Birmingham (1981) and Luton (1982).

In 1979, the JKLF planned to disrupt the international cricket match being played in Srinagar. The visiting Australian team was guarded with high security and no untoward incidents occurred. Praveen Swami states that the JKLF made plans to bomb the March 1983 conference of non-aligned meeting in New Delhi and to hijack an airliner from New Delhi, both of which were aborted. After the arrival of Hashim Qureshi in the UK in January 1984, another hijacking was planned.

However, on 3 February 1984, members of the National Liberation Army kidnapped the Indian diplomat Ravindra Mhatre in Birmingham and demanded the release of Maqbool Bhat as ransom. Amanullah Khan was named as the interlocutor. Unfortunately, the kidnappers panicked at the possibility of a police raid and, allegedly upon Amanullah Khan's instructions, shot the diplomat. India executed Maqbool Bhat six days later, turning him into a martyr and giving JKLF the visibility it lacked earlier. A British court convicted two members of the JKLF for the killing of Mhatre. Hashim Qureshi and Amanullah Khan were expelled from the UK.

== Kashmir insurgency ==
Amanullah Khan and Hashim Qureshi returned to Pakistan in 1984, establishing the JKLF headquarters at Muzaffarabad. Pakistan under Zia ul-Haq, which was already supporting the Khalistani militants in Punjab, was ready to support an insurgency in Kashmir, and Khan was ready to work with the Pakistan's Inter-Services Intelligence (ISI). Hashim Qureshi, on the other hand, refused and went into exile in Holland. JKLF started political planning and continued till the end of 1987.

Following the allegedly rigged state election in Jammu and Kashmir in 1987, the disaffected youth of the Kashmir Valley started crossing the Line of Control to Azad Kashmir to obtain arms and training. Khan's JKLF was their natural destination. Scholar Paul Staniland states that the JKLF was "reborn" in the Indian-controlled Kashmir in this period. It was led by young activists from Srinagar and environs, who crossed into Azad Kashmir for arms and training and returned to Srinagar. Yasin Malik, along with Hamid Sheikh, Ashfaq Wani and Javed Ahmad Mir, formed the core group — dubbed the "HAJY" group — of the JKLF militants in the Kashmir Valley. The enormity of popular support received for their call for independence surprised them. Within two years, the JKLF in the Valley emerged as the "vanguard and spearhead of a popular uprising" against the Indian state.

The JKLF waged a guerrilla war with the Indian security forces, kidnapping of Rubiya Sayeed, the daughter of Indian Home Minister, and targeting attacks on the government and security officials. In March 1990, Ashfaq Wani was killed in a battle with Indian security forces. In August 1990, Yasin Malik was captured in a wounded condition. He was imprisoned until May 1994. Hamid Sheikh was also captured in 1992 but released by the Border Security Force to counteract the pro-Pakistan guerrillas. By 1992, the majority of the JKLF militants were killed or captured. As Pakistan's security establishment turned its attention to Kashmir, the secular dimension of the struggle receded and by the early 1990s Islamist groups with ties to the ISI and the military had displaced the independence movement's secular rhetoric with Pakistani nationalism and symbolism of Jihad.

A pro-independence JKLF was not in Pakistan's interest. Pakistan is believed to have accepted the collaboration with JKLF only as a "necessary compromise," because the Islamist groups did not yet have currency in the Kashmir Valley. However, the cadres of Islamist groups were also trained in the JKLF training camps in Azad Kashmir. This quickly led to a dilution of the JKLF's nationalist ideology. Independence and Islam became interchangeable slogans. The Islamist attacks that ensued on Kashmiri Pandits, liberal women in general, liquor shops and beauty parlours were never condemned by the JKLF. According to Hasim Qureshi, such outrages were "official Pakistan policy" and the policy was endorsed by the Islamic Right as well as the Amanullah Khan's JKLF. "The ISI ran this movement on communal lines right from the beginning," said Qureshi, "and for that Amanullah and his underlings became its agents."

== Transition to peaceful struggle ==
By 1992, the majority of the JKLF militants were killed or captured and they were yielding ground to pro-Pakistan guerilla groups such as the Hizb-ul-Mujahideen, strongly backed by the Pakistani military authorities. Further encroachment by pan-Islamist fighters infiltrating into the Valley from Pakistan changed the colour of the insurgency. Pakistan ceased its financial support to the JKLF because of its pro-independence ideology.

After release from prison on bail in May 1994, Yasin Malik declared an indefinite ceasefire of the JKLF. However, according to him, JKLF still lost a hundred activists to Indian operations. Independent journalists mentioned three hundred activists were killed. They were said to have been compromised by Hizb-ul-Mujahideen members, who informed their whereabouts to the security forces.

Malik's call for peaceful struggle was unacceptable to Amanullah Khan, who removed him as the president of JKLF. In return, Malik expelled Khan from the chairmanship. Thus JKLF had split into two factions. The Pakistan government recognised Yasin Malik as the leader of JKLF, which further complicated the situation.

Ellis and Khan state that, during the Azad Kashmir elections in 1996, JKLF commanded more support than all the traditional parties, even though it was not allowed to contest elections due to its pro-Independence stance.

== Splits and reunification ==
The JKLF split into two factions after the group based in Indian-administered Kashmir led by Yasin Malik publicly renounced violence in 1995. Their counterparts in Pakistani-administered Kashmir, led by Amanullah Khan refused to do so, thereby precipitating a split in the party.

Since 1995, Yasin Malik has renounced violence and calls for strictly peaceful methods to come to a settlement on the Kashmir issue. Yasin Malik also considers the Kashmiri Pandits, about 400,000 Hindus who were driven out of Kashmir after violent attacks by the separatists presently staying in refugee camps in Jammu and other Indian cities, to be an integral part of Kashmiri society and has insisted on their right of return.

Yasin Malik said,

"We want our Kashmiri Pandit mothers, sisters and brothers to come back. It is their land. They have every right to live in it as we do. This is the time that Kashmiri Muslims must play a constructive role so that we can restore the culture for which we are famous all over the world."

A Guardian report in October 2001 said the JKLF had been eclipsed over the preceding decade by hardline guerilla groups backed by successive Pakistani governments.

In 2002, in an interview to Reuters, Amanullah Khan blamed Pakistani backed non-Kashmiri Muslim militants for having harmed his cause.

"I've been saying for the last two to three years that (non-Kashmiri militants) are changing the Kashmir freedom struggle into terrorism."

After the December 2001 attack on Indian Parliament, Amanullah's name figured in the list of 20 wanted terrorists India provided to Pakistan to be extradited for various terrorism-related offences. In January 2002, Amanullah Khan offered to surrender to Indian authorities provided an "international court issued a verdict against him".

In 2005, India allowed Yasin Malik to visit Pakistan for the first time. The two leaders, Malik and Khan seized the opportunity to meet each other in Pakistan. In June 2005, a decade after the split, Malik and Khan agreed to reunite the JKLF. The JKLF in is currently under the leadership of Raja Haq Nawaz due to incarceration of Yasin Malik

In December 2005, some senior members of the JKLF separated from Yasin Malik and formed a new JKLF with Farooq Siddiqi ("Farooq Papa") as its Chairman along with Javed Mir, Salim Nannaji and Iqbal Gundroo, later joined by former militant Bitta Karate. Lately Tahir Mir, former chief of Students Liberation Front, too parted ways with Malik and joined JKLF headed by Farooq Papa. Kashmir watchers think that Yasin Malik's shifting policy of seeking an internal solution with India after its alleged secret meeting with the Prime Minister of India led to the secession of its senior leaders. Farooq Papa supports the involvement of the European Union in resolving the dispute, and has called on EU officials to follow up the visit of an ad hoc European parliament delegation to Kashmir in 2004.terrorism.openDemocracy

== See also ==
- Maulana Masroor Abbas Ansari
- Kashmir conflict
- Kashmir insurgency

== Bibliography ==
- Behera, Navnita Chadha (2007), Demystifying Kashmir, Pearson Education India, ISBN 978-8131708460
- Bhatnagar, Gaurav (2009), "The Islamicization of Politics: Motivations for Violence in Kashmir" (PDF), The Journal of Politics and Society, 20 (1): 1–20
- Bose, Sumantra (2003), Kashmir: Roots of Conflict, Paths to Peace, Harvard University Press, ISBN 0-674-01173-2
- Cheema, Amar (2015), The Crimson Chinar: The Kashmir Conflict: A Politico Military Perspective, Lancer Publishers, ISBN 978-81-7062-301-4
- Ellis, Patricia; Khan, Zafar (2003), "The Kashmiri diaspora: Influences in Kashmir", in Nadje Al-Ali; Khalid Koser (eds.), New Approaches to Migration?: Transnational Communities and the Transformation of Home, Routledge, pp. 169–185, ISBN 978-1-134-52377-1
- Jaffrelot, Christophe (2002), Pakistan: Nationalism without a Nation, Zed Books, ISBN 978-1-84277-117-4
- Schofield, Victoria (2003) [First published in 2000], Kashmir in Conflict, London and New York: I. B. Taurus & Co, ISBN 1860648983
- Staniland, Paul (2014), Networks of Rebellion: Explaining Insurgent Cohesion and Collapse, Cornell University Press, ISBN 978-0-8014-7102-5
- Swami, Praveen (2007), India, Pakistan and the Secret Jihad: The covert war in Kashmir, 1947-2004, Asian Security Studies, Routledge, ISBN 978-0-415-40459-4
- Widmalm, Sten (2014) [first published 2002], Kashmir in Comparative Perspective: Democracy and Violent Separatism in India, Routledge, ISBN 978-1-136-86694-4
