= Praveen Swami =

Indian journalist & author (born 1969)

- Born: 1969 (age 56–57)
- Citizenship: Indian
- Occupations: Journalist and Author
- Spouse: Nishtha Gautam

Praveen Swami (born 1969) is an Indian journalist and author specialising on international strategic and security issues. He is currently the National Security Editor at ThePrint. He was the Diplomatic Editor of The Daily Telegraph newspaper between September 2010 – October 2011, after which, he became the National Editor (Strategic and International Affairs) of The Indian Express newspaper from August 2014- January 2017 and the Group Consulting Editor at Network18 Group between July 2018 - January 2022. Swami is the author of two books on the India-Pakistan conflict in Kashmir. He was described by the BBC as "one of India's foremost experts of Islamist terrorism".

== Career ==
Swami was the Associate Editor of the Indian newspaper The Hindu from 1993, for which he reported on topics such as the conflict in Kashmir, the Left-wing Maoist insurgency in India, and Islamic groups. He reported on Kashmir, Punjab and security issues for much of the 1990s before becoming the Mumbai bureau chief in 1998. He was appointed as Resident Editor New Delhi, The Hindu in October 2011. Swami, along with Rural Affairs Editor P Sainath, resigned from The Hindu in mid-2014. Both journalists hinted they found it difficult to work under the new system which emerged after the shift in power structure [changes in the top-level management, when family decided to run The Hindu itself] in Kasturi and Sons Ltd in October 2013. Former editor Siddhartha Varadarajan and Executive Editor MK Venu were ousted from their positions in October 2013.

== Awards ==
Praveen Swami has won several awards for his work. He received the Sanskriti Samman Award in 1999 for a series of investigative stories on Indian military and intelligence failures preceding and during the Kargil War. His work on the Indian army's counter-terrorist operations won him the Prem Bhatia Memorial Award for Political Journalism in 2003. In 2006, he also won the Indian Express - Ramnath Goenka Excellence in Journalism prize for "his extensive and in-depth reports on terrorism in Jammu & Kashmir, and investigations into the merchants of terror." Swami was a Jennings Randolph Senior Fellow at the United States Institute of Peace in Washington in 2004–2005.

== Bibliography ==
=== Books ===
- An Informal War: India, Pakistan and the Secret Jihad in Jammu and Kashmir (London: Routledge, 2007)
- The Kargil War (New Delhi: LeftWord Books, 1999)
- ‘Quick Step or Kadam Taal: The Elusive Search for Peace in Jammu and Kashmir’ (Washington DC: United States Institute of Peace Special Report 133, 2005)

=== Selected articles ===
- ‘Chi tocca il Kashmir muore’, in Limes: Pianeta India (Rome: Gruppo Editoriale L’Espresso, 2009)
- ‘The Transnational Terror Threat to India’, in Satish Kumar (ed.), India’s National Security Annual Review, 2009 (New Delhi: Routledge, 2009)
- ‘India’s and its Invisible Jihad’ in Satish Kumar (ed.), India’s National Security Annual Review, 2008 (New Delhi: KW Publishers, 2008)
- ‘The Well-Tempered Jihad: the Politics and Practice of Post-2002 Islamist Terrorism in India’, in Contemporary South Asia Volume 16, Issue 3 (September 2008)
- ‘A War to End a War: the Causes and Outcomes of the 2001-2 India-Pakistan Crisis’ in (eds.) Sumit Ganguly and S. Paul Kapoor, Nuclear Proliferation in South Asia (London: Routledge, 2008)
- ‘Breaking News: India’s Media Revolution,’ in (eds.) Sumit Ganguly, Larry Diamond and Marc F. Plattner, The State of India’s Democracy (Baltimore: Johns Hopkins University Press, 2008)
- ‘Lashkar-e-Taiba’ in Wilson John and Swati Parashar, (ed.), Terrorism in South-East Asia (Singapore: Longman, 2005)
- ‘Failed Threats and Flawed Fences: India’s Military Responses to Pakistan's Proxy War’ in The India Review, Volume 3.2 (London: Frank Cass, 2004)
- ‘Terrorism in Jammu and Kashmir, in Theory and Practice,’ in The India Review Volume 2.3 (London: Frank Cass 2003)
- ‘J & K after 9/11: More of the Same,’ in Faultlines XI, (New Delhi: Institute for Conflict Management, 2002)
- ‘Dialogue with the Hizb: Light in the Tunnel, But is it Dawn or Sunset?’, in Faultlines VI (New Delhi: Institute for Conflict Management, 2001)
- ‘The Kargil War: Preliminary Explorations’ in Faultlines II, (New Delhi: Institute for Conflict Management, 1999)
- ‘Pro-active after Pokhran: A Perspective on Terrorism in J & K,’ in Faultlines I, (New Delhi: Institute for Conflict Management, 1998)
