= British Mirpuris =

Kashmiri diaspora community in the UK

British Kashmiris
Total population
- Approximately 60–80 per cent of the British Pakistani population (estimate for England only)

Regions with significant populations
- Birmingham, Bradford, London, Manchester, Luton, Leeds, Blackburn and surrounding towns

Languages
- Pahari-Pothwari, Urdu, English (British)

Religion
- Islam

British Kashmiris (Urdu: برطانوی میرپوری) are Britons or residents of the United Kingdom with ancestral roots in the Mirpur Division of Pakistan-administered Azad Jammu and Kashmir. The region represents historical Mirpur District, including the present-day districts of Mirpur, Kotli and Bhimber, where related Pahari-Pothwari dialects such as Chibhali are spoken. While no accurate statistics are available, an estimated 60 to 80 per cent of British Pakistanis in England trace their origins from this region.

Kashmiris from Mirpur started settling in Britain in the 1940s, transferring their workmanship on British merchant navy ships to the industrial needs of the growing British economy. The migration accelerated after construction of the Mangla Dam began in 1961, submerging vast areas of farmland in the Mirpur district.

== Population ==
Large Azad Kashmiri communities can be found in Birmingham, Bradford, London, Manchester, Leeds, Luton and the surrounding towns.

== History ==
Migration from the Kingdom of Kashmir began soon after the Second World War as the majority of the male population of this area and the Potohar region worked in the British armed forces, as well as to fill labour shortages in industry. But the mass migration phenomenon accelerated in the 1960s, when, to improve the supply of water, the Mangla Dam project was built in the area, flooding the surrounding farmlands. Up to 5,000 people from Mirpur (5% of the displaced) resettled in Britain. More joined their relatives in Britain after benefiting from government compensation and liberal migration policies.

== Culture and social issues ==
Mirpur was considered to be a conservative district in 1960s, and life in its rural villages was dominated by rigid hierarchies. The first generation Mirpuris were not highly educated, and they had little or no experience of urban living in Pakistan. An economic boom brought dramatic changes to the area after its residents began migrating to Europe, especially the UK, bolstering remittances to Pakistan. Families in Pakistan are close knit and the guiding influence behind everything from marriage to business. The current literacy rate of Azad Jammu and Kashmir is 78%, compared with 62.3% in Pakistan. In Azad Jammu and Kashmir, primary school enrolment is 80% for boys and 74% for girls.

The community has made notable progress in UK politics and a sizeable number of MPs, councillors, lord mayors and deputy mayors are representing the community in different constituencies.

=== Endogamy and kinship ===
Cousin marriages or marriages within the same tribe and caste system are common in some parts of South Asia, including rural areas of Pakistan. A major motivation is to preserve patrilineal tribal identity. As a result, there are some common genealogical origins within these tribes. Some British Pakistanis view cousin marriages as a way of preserving this ancient tribal tradition and maintaining a sense of brotherhood.

A small scale study of 100 randomly selected British Pakistani mothers was published in 1988 in the Journal of Medical Genetics, which looked specifically at two hospitals in West Yorkshire, found that the rate of consanguineous marriage was 55 per cent and suggested that the rate was rising. Representatives of constituencies where there are high Pakistani populations say that consanguineous marriages amongst British Pakistanis are now decreasing in number, partly because of public health initiatives.

=== Forced marriage ===
According to the British Home Office, as of 2000, more than half the cases of forced marriage investigated involve families of Pakistani origin, followed by Bangladeshis and Indians. The Home Office estimates that 85 per cent of the victims of forced marriages are women aged 15–24, 90 per cent are Muslim, and 90 per cent are of Pakistani or Bangladeshi heritage. 60 per cent of forced marriages by Pakistani families were linked to the small towns of Bhimber and Kotli and the city of Mirpur.

== Identity ==
Christopher Snedden writes that most of the native residents of Azad Kashmir are not of Kashmiri ethnicity; rather, they could be called "Jammuites" due to their historical and cultural links with that region, which is coterminous with neighbouring Punjab and Hazara. Because their region was formerly a part of the princely state of Jammu and Kashmir and is named after it, many Azad Kashmiris have adopted the "Kashmiri" identity, whereas in an ethnolinguistic context, the term "Kashmiri" would ordinarily refer to natives of the Kashmir Valley region. The population of Azad Kashmir has strong historical, cultural and linguistic affinities with the neighbouring populations of upper Punjab and Potohar region of Pakistan. They have strong tribal identity and are divided into tribes like Jatts, Rajputs & Gujjars etc.

In 2009, a consultation was undertaken into the effects of providing an individual tick-box for "Kashmiri" people in the UK census. The majority of those who took part in the consultation chose to self-identify as Pakistani and a decision was taken not to introduce a Kashmiri tick-box for the ethnic group question in the 2011 census.

The following ethnic codes are used in UK school ethnicity profiles:

- AMPK: Mirpuri Pakistani
- AKPA: Kashmiri Pakistani
- AKAO: Kashmiri Other

== See also ==
- Azad Kashmiri diaspora
- British Pakistanis
- British Punjabis
