= Mukhtar Ahmed Waza =

Kashmiri political leader (born 1968)

- مختار احمد وازہ
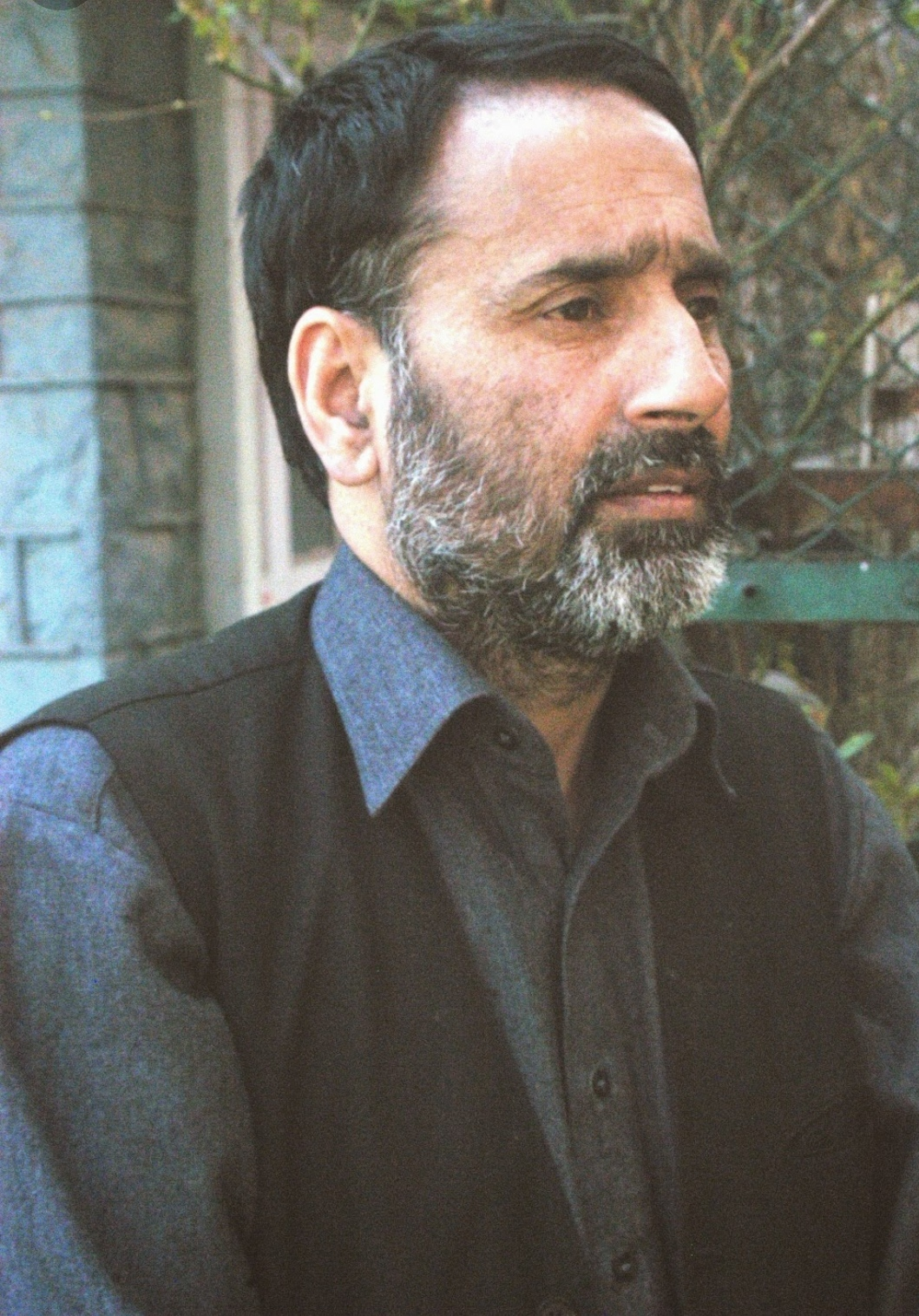
- Waza in 2016
- Born: 1968; Anantnag, Jammu and Kashmir, India
- Occupation: Kashmiri Political Separatist Leader
- Known for: Advocacy of peaceful resolution of kashmir issue & rights to self determination of kashmiri people
- Office: Chairman Jammu & kashmir Peoples League ; Executive Council Member of All Parties Hurriyat Conference
- Predecessor: Sheikh Abdul Aziz
- Children: 2
- Website: http://wazamukhtar.blogspot.com http://peoplesleague.blogspot.com

Signature
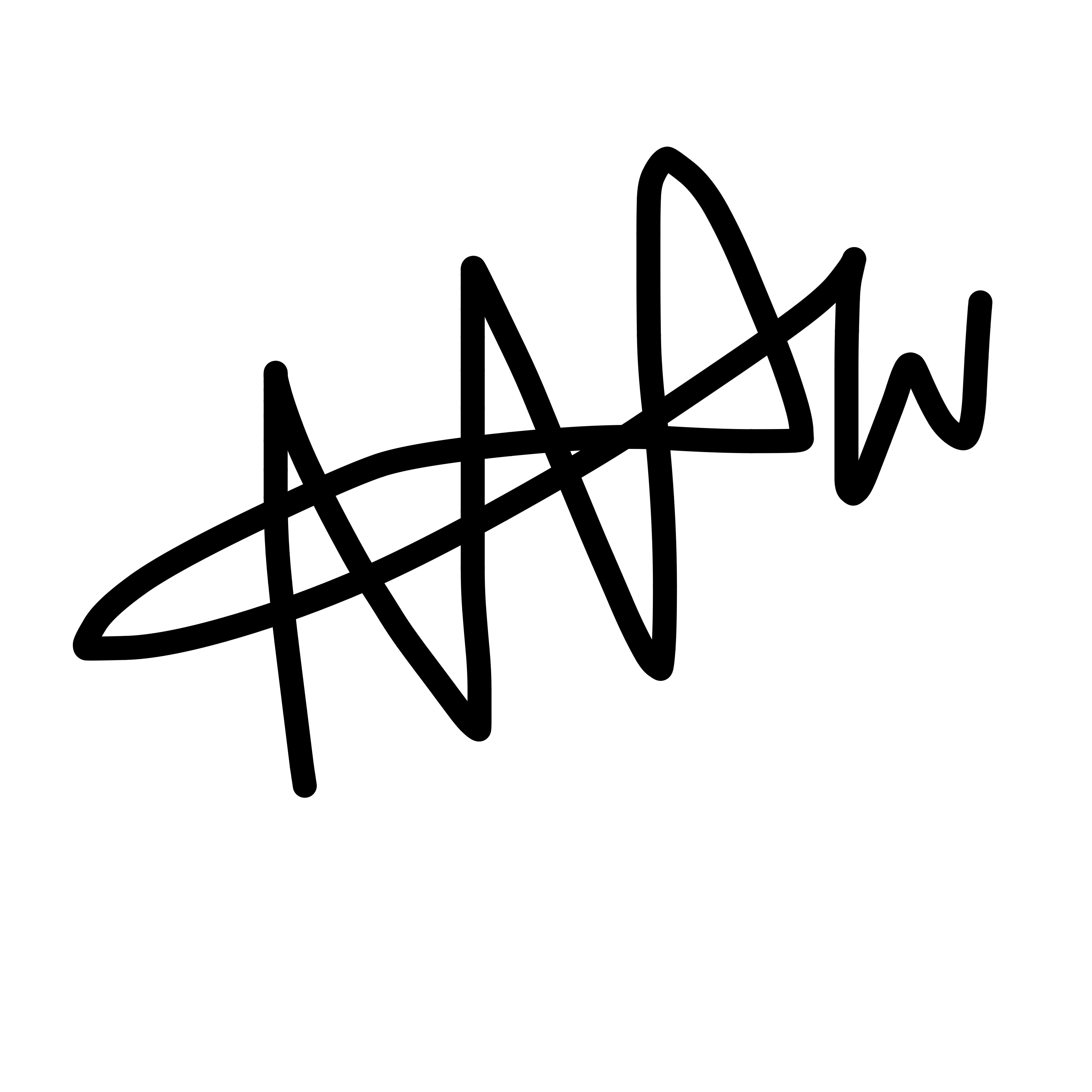

Mukhtar Ahmed Waza, commonly known as Mukhtar Waza, is a moderate Kashmiri separatist leader. He is the Chairman of the Jammu & Kashmir People's League (JKPL), a constituent of APHC and political faction banned by the government of India. Waza is also an executive council member of the All Parties Hurriyat Conference (Mirwaiz Faction).

== Early life ==
Waza was born in Jammu and Kashmir, India on 2 June 1968. He attended Government Middle School in Sarnal, Anantnag. Due to his affiliation with the People's League (JKPL), he was imprisoned at the age of 16, Though He later completed his studies in Political Science , Peace & Conflict Studies and Philosophy.

== Political career ==
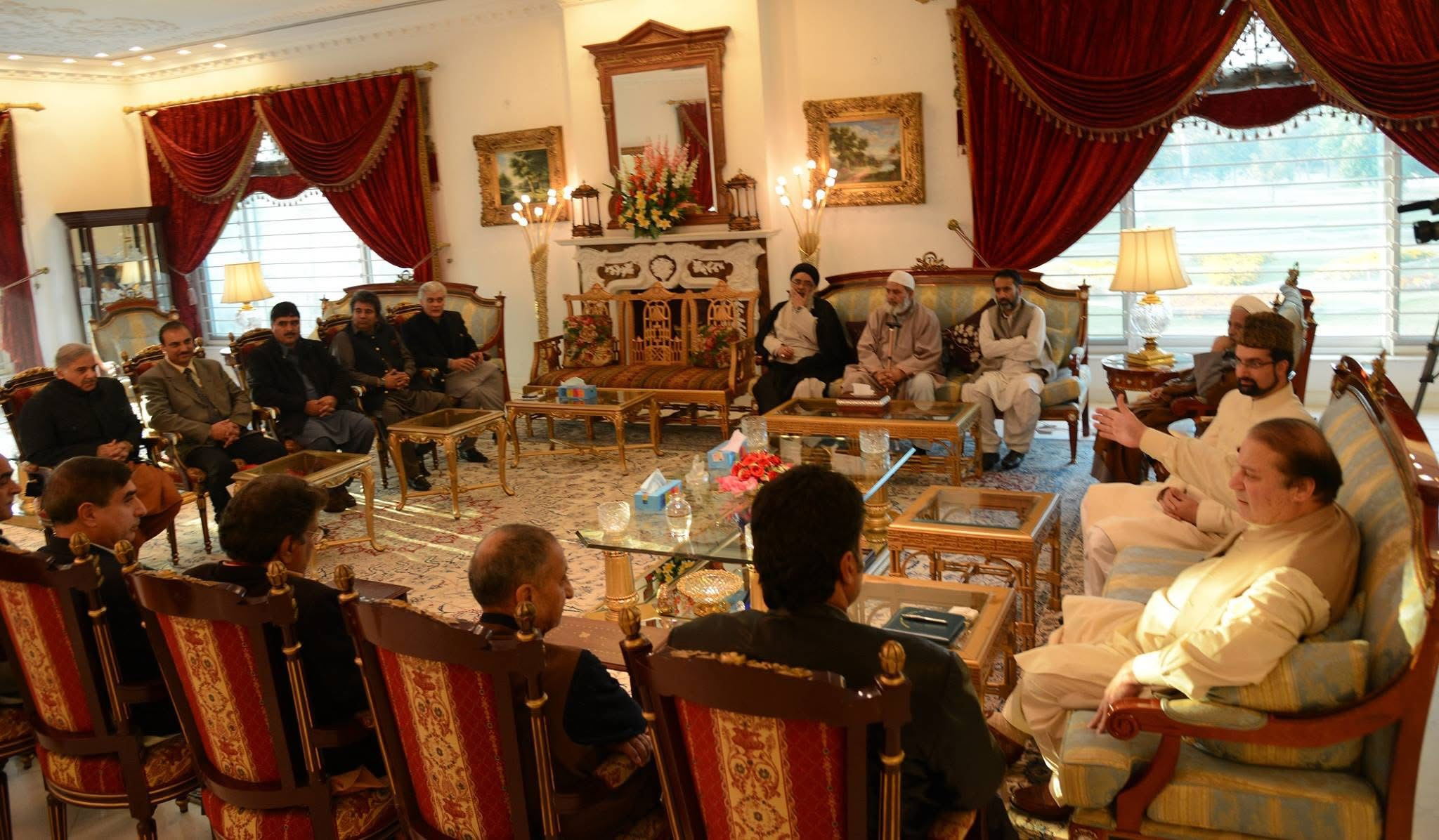
Waza meets Nawaz Shareif in 2012 in Pakistan

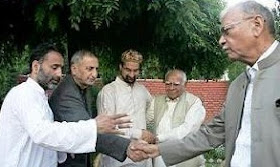
Waza meets ram Jethmalani

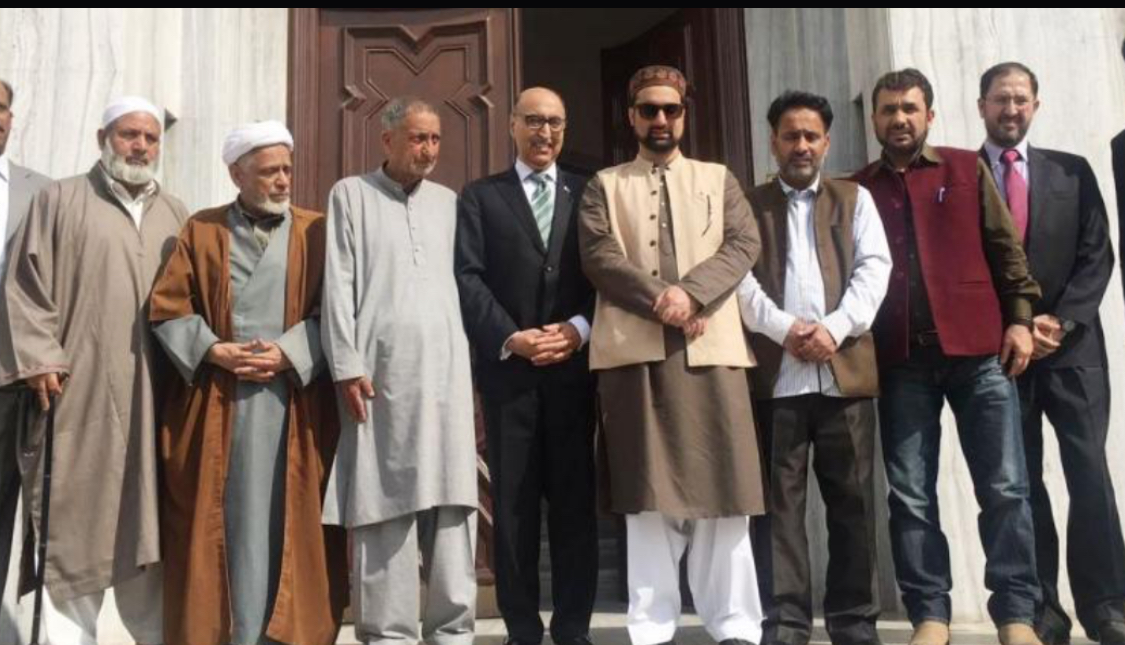
Waza meets Abdul Basit in New Delhi

Waza began his political career in 1982 at the age of 14, leading a peaceful demonstration in the erstwhile state of Jammu and Kashmir. His activism resulted in his arrest and subsequent detention under the Jammu and Kashmir Public Safety Act, 1978 (PSA) for a period of three years. In 1986, he was again detained for one year under the Terrorist and Disruptive Activities (Prevention) Act (TADA). He, along with the JKPL activists, were arrested on several occasions, including in March 1992. After the death of Sheikh Abdul Aziz, Waza became the chairman of Peoples League and executive member of All Parties Hurriyat Conference and was re-elected as chairman in 2013. Waza has been involved in talks at highest level of government both in India and Pakistan including visiting Pakistan on an official diplomatic trip and meeting Prime Minister Raja Pervaiz Ashraf, President Asif Ali Zardari. Foreign Minister Hina Rabbani Khar in 2012 other leaders include Shehbaz Sharif, Nawaz Sharif, Syed Munawar Hussain and Liaqat Baloch. Waza also met several international and national delegations too including meeting Pak high commissioner Abdul Basit in New Delhi several times and Ram Jethmalani as part of the Kashmir Committee in 2011. Over his 40 year long period of political struggle he has nearly spent 10 years in several jails across India. Waza has been closely associated with Abdul Gani Bhat from 1986 to 2025 till he died, Waza termed Bhat as his father like figure who taught him almost all pillars of life.

== Personal life ==
In 2004, Waza married a Kashmiri woman in Anantnag district of Jammu and Kashmir. The couple have two sons.

== See also ==
- All Parties Hurriyat Conference
- Mirwaiz Umar Farooq
- Mohammad Abbas Ansari
- Abdul Gani Bhat
- Abdul Ghani Lone
- Kashmiri separatism

== Sources ==
- Press Trust Of Kashmir. (2019, January 15). Kashmir's historical background cannot be ignored: Mukhtar Waza. Press Trust Of Kashmir. https://presstrustofkashmir.com/2019/01/15/kashmirs-historical-background-cannot-be-ignored-mukhtar-waza/
- Kns. (2016, December 4). Waza visits Dooru, pays tributes to martyr Sajad Malik. KNS. Waza visits Dooru, pays tributes to martyr Sajad Malik
- Indian police arrest Mukhtar Ahmad Waza in IOK. (n.d.). https://www.radio.gov.pk/05-02-2018/indian-police-arrest-mukhtar-ahmad-waza-in-iok
- Islamabad, T. O. (2018, October 29). Indian police arrest Mukhtar Waza in IOK. Times of Islamabad. https://timesofislamabad.com/29-Oct-2018/indian-police-arrest-mukhtar-waza-in-iok
- The Kashmir Pulse. (2018, March 15). Kashmir settlement vital for durable peace: Waza. The Kashmir Pulse. https://kashmirpulse.com/jk/kashmir/kashmir-settlement-vital-for-durable-peace-waza/291.html?amp=
- Police arrest Mukhtar Ahmad Waza on way to Pulwama - UrduPoint. (2018, May 1). UrduPoint. Police Arrest Mukhtar Ahmad Waza On Way To Pulwama
- Press Trust Of Kashmir. (2019b, January 15). Kashmir's historical background cannot be ignored: Mukhtar Waza. Press Trust Of Kashmir. https://presstrustofkashmir.com/2019/01/15/kashmirs-historical-background-cannot-be-ignored-mukhtar-waza/
- Waza calls for peaceful resolution of Kashmir dispute. (n.d.). https://www.radio.gov.pk/08-04-2021/waza-calls-for-peaceful-resolution-of-kashmir-dispute
- Observer News Service. (2013, November 24). Waza re-elected PL Chief. Kashmir Observer. Waza Re-elected PL Chief
- Press Trust Of Kashmir. (2018, October 9). Mukhtar waza urges New Delhi’ to shun confrontation and start dialogue. Press Trust Of Kashmir. https://presstrustofkashmir.com/2018/10/09/mukhtar-waza-urges-new-delhi-to-shun-confrontation-and-start-dialogue/
- Kashmir dispute basic reason for India-Pak Rift: Mukhtar Waza
- https://presstrustofkashmir.com/2019/01/15/kashmirs-historical-background-cannot-be-ignored-mukhtar-waza/
- Waza visits Dooru, pays tributes to martyr Sajad Malik
- Indian police arrest Mukhtar Ahmad Waza in IOK
- Indian police arrest Mukhtar Waza in IOK
- ‘No Change in National Policy on Kashmir,’ Pak Envoy tells Hurriyat Conference (m)
- JKPL condemns arrest of party chairman Mukhtar Waza
- Kashmir settlement vital for durable peace: Waza
- Kashmir settlement also in India’s interest: Waza
- Police Arrest Mukhtar Ahmad Waza On Way To Pulwama
- https://presstrustofkashmir.com/2019/01/15/kashmirs-historical-background-cannot-be-ignored-mukhtar-waza/
- Waza calls for peaceful resolution of Kashmir dispute
- Waza Re-elected PL Chief
- https://presstrustofkashmir.com/2018/10/09/mukhtar-waza-urges-new-delhi-to-shun-confrontation-and-start-dialogue/
