= Mustafa Hussain Ansari =

Indian writer and scholar

Maulana Mustafa Hussain Ansari
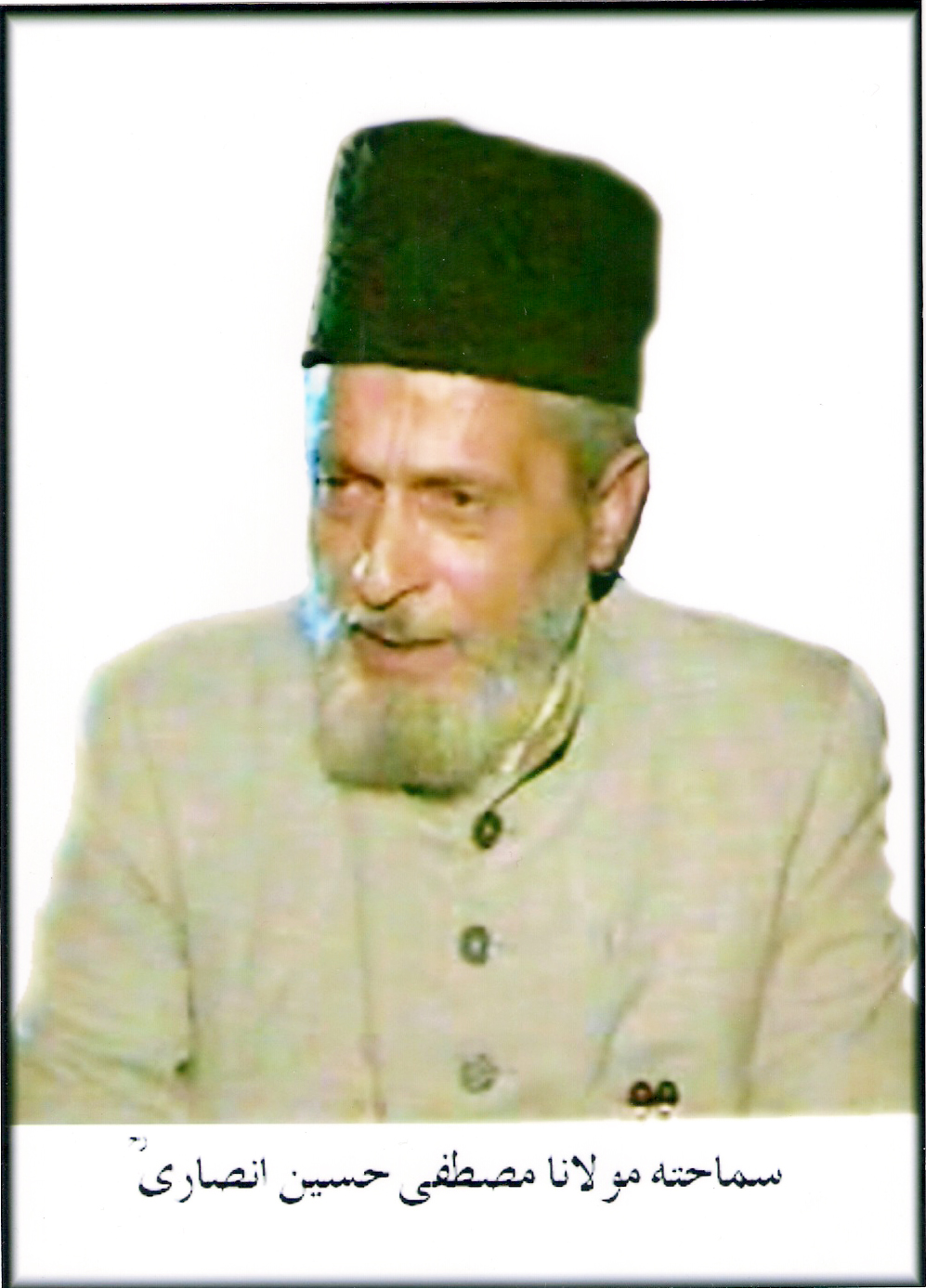
- Molvi Mustafa Ansari in 90s

Personal life
- Born: 21 March 1945 Srinagar, Jammu and Kashmir, British Raj
- Died: 27 April 2006 (aged 61) Srinagar, Jammu and kashmir
- Relatives: Mohammad Abbas Ansari (brother); Masroor Abbas Ansari (Nephew); Sajjad Haider (Son)

Religious life
- Religion: Islam
- Denomination: Shia
- Jurisprudence: Jaʽfari (Usuli)
- Creed: Twelver

Maulana Mustafa Hussain Ansari (Arabic: مولانا (علامه) مصطفى حسين انصارى, (born 21 March 1945, died 27 April 2006 in Srinagar) was a Kashmiri writer, scholar and preacher in Jammu and Kashmir. He was the brother of Mohammad Abbas Ansari and uncle of Masroor Abbas Ansari.

== Biography ==
He was from the influential Ansari family of Srinagar, and was known for his oratorical skill. He was often called to defuse heated confrontations arising between sects due to misunderstandings and to mediate between them.

He was also noted for his treatises including the Kashmiri commentary of the Quran as well as biographical works on Muhammad and Imam Hussain.

== Death ==
Ansari died after a brief illness on 27 April 2006 in Srinagar. Tens of thousands attended his funeral procession.

== Works ==
=== Commentary and translations ===
- Kashf-ul-Aneeq-fi-Sharh-e-Qanoon-al-Ameeq: Kashmiri translation and commentary of the holy Qur'an.1975
- Minhajul Qur'an: Urdu translation and commentary of holy Qur'an. 2002
- Misbahul Qur'an (Kashmiri commentary)
- Sharh-e-Nahjul Balagha in Kashmiri (Unpublished)

=== Philosophy ===
- Al-Meezan
- Islam May Haq-e-Talaaq
- Khayabaan
- Mujrim
- Huqquq-ul-Ebaad
- Rakht-e-Safar (last work)

=== Society ===
- Mairay JigarKa Lahoo
- Noor Say Naar Tak
- Gina Say Zina Tak

=== Biography ===
- Aftab-e-Nubuwat: First Published 1973, Second edition: 2006
- Qateel-e-Nainava- Imam Hussain and his Revolution - 2006
- Mard-e-Ahan: Biography of Imam Ali
- Marde Na Mutnahi
- Arman
- Aakhri Tabasumm: Biography of Hazrat Ali Asghar, youngest martyr in the battle fields of Karbala

=== Rejoinders ===
- Jalwa-e-Toor
- Ammed-e-Madani Bajawab-e-Kaleed-e-Ludani
- Imam Gayab Ba Jawab-e-Imam Gayab
- Islam may Haqe Talaq

=== Historical novels ===
- Qabeela
- Saazish
- Intiqam
- Baghavat

=== Poetry ===
- Safar-e-Natamaam
