= Masroor Abbas Ansari =

Kashmiri religious leader (born 1975)

Quaid-e-Itthad Maulana Allama Masroor Abbas Ansari
- مسرور عباس انصاری
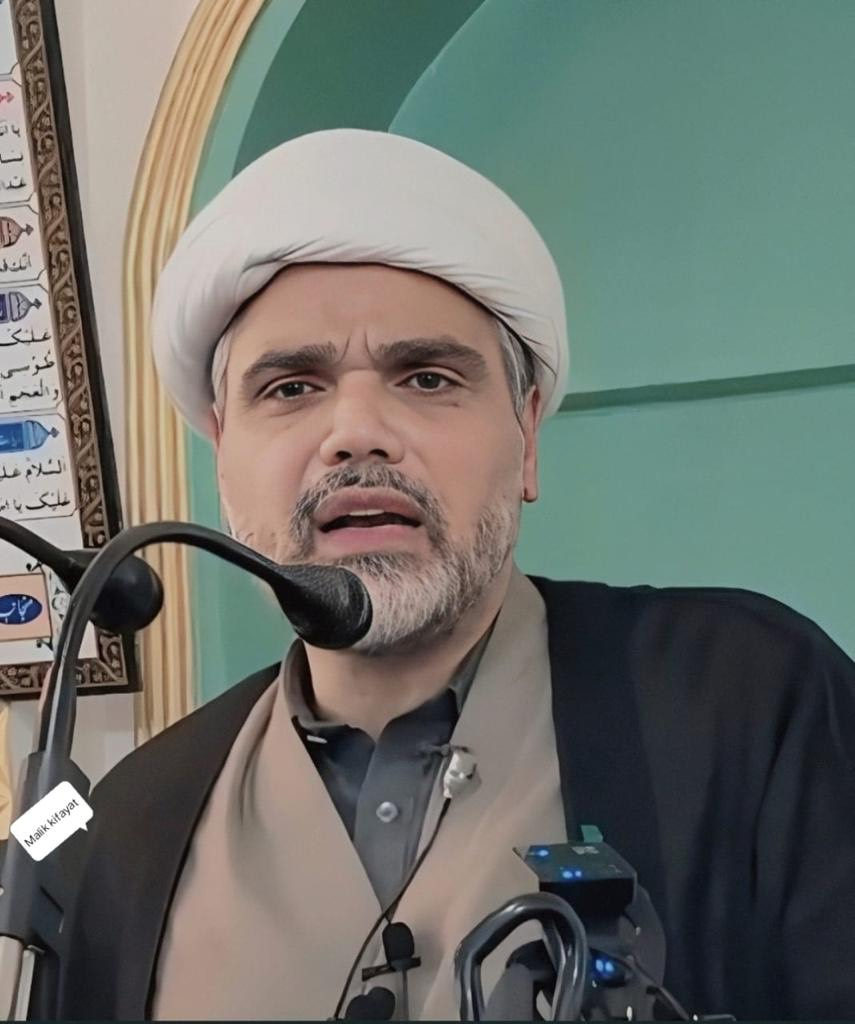

Chairman of Jammu and Kashmir Ittihadul Muslimeen
- Incumbent
- Assumed office 27 October 2022
- Preceded by: Mohammad Abbas Ansari
- Title: Maulana; Allama; Hujjat-ul-Islam Wal Muslimeen

Personal life
- Born: Masroor Abbas Ansari; 5 December 1971 (age 54) Srinagar, Jammu and Kashmir, India
- Children: 2 sons
- Parent: Mohammad Abbas Ansari (father)
- Era: Modern era
- Region: Kashmir
- Political party: Jammu and Kashmir Ittihadul Muslimeen
- Main interest(s): Islamic philosophy, Quranic exegesis, mantiq, logic, tawhid, Kashf al-Asrar, tahrir al-wasilah, Islamic government, uṣūl al-fiqh, nahj al-balagha
- Education: Ganghi College, Srinagar; Kashmir University; Houza Ilmia Qom, Iran
- Occupation: Religious Shia scholar and moderate separatist leader
- Relatives: Mustafa Hussain Ansari (uncle); Sajjad Haider Ansari (cousin)
- Website: ittihadul.tripod.com

Religious life
- Religion: Islam
- Denomination: Usuli
- School: Twelver Shia
- Sect: Pan Islamic Unity in Jammu and Kashmir
- Jurisprudence: Ja`fari
- Profession: Khateeb and Imam of Friday Prayer of Majid Sajjadia Chattabal, Srinagar

Muslim leader
- Based in: Srinagar
- Post: Cleric; Jurist; Shia Muslim leader
- Period in office: 2015 – present
- Influenced by: Muhammad Iqbal Ruhollah Khomeini Ali Khamenei Ali al-Sistani Syed Jawad Naqvi

Maulana Masroor Abbas Ansari is Kashmiri Twelver Shia scholar. He is also a cleric, preacher, activist, theologian, religious and political leader in Indian-administered Jammu and Kashmir. He is the Chairman of Jammu and Kashmir Ittihadul Muslimeen (JKIM), a Kashmiri nationalist Shia political party that aims for Shi'a–Sunni unity in Kashmir and is also a religious organization that conducts the Grand Ashura Procession in Kashmir. He is a senior leader of the separatist All Parties Hurriyat Conference. He is also one of the founder leaders of Majlis Ulema Immamia. He succeeded his father Mohammad Abbas Ansari after his death.

== Early life and education ==
Ansari was born on 5 March 1971, in Downtown Srinagar. He graduated from Sri Pratap College in Srinagar and then went to University of Kashmir. Later, he traveled to Iran to study at the Qom Seminary.

== Career ==
After 14 years of study in Iran, Ansari returned to Kashmir in 2004 and started his religio-political activities. Soon he was elected the president of JKIM. He was the Sub Editor of the monthly Urdu magazine Safina, which was published from Karan Nagar, Srinagar. He is a senior leader of All Parties Hurriyat Conference. He has been detained many times over the Kashmir conflict. On 9 July 2023, he was detained again.

Ansari, said that the police action against peaceful mourners on and before Ashura in 2022 is reprehensible and that the government's assertion of taking action during the pandemic is false, as participants were following all SOPs.

=== Educational upliftment ===
Masroor Abbas worked for the upliftment of the educational level of Shia community in the Kashmir Valley. In the initial stages when he returned to Kashmir, Masroor organized different classes to teach different subjects especially ethics in modest rooms at different places, the impact of his words was immense, as he imparted the teachings of the Islamic religion to these eager minds. Additionally, he selflessly collaborated with other Islamic organizations to further advance their shared goals in this noble endeavor. Maulana Masroor in his Friday prayer sermons mostly stressed on education and in his lectures, he shed light on how important education is for the successful society. Maulana Masroor organized and participated into number of educational conferences and seminars to propagate the values of education. He also participated in educational conferences of different colleges as representative of Shia community. Masroor has emphasised the teaching of kalam.

He is also one of the founders of Majlis Ulema Immamia, an amalgam of all Shia clerics of Jammu and Kashmir.

== Politics ==
=== 2016 ===
All Parties Hurriyat Conference leaders Mirwaiz Umar Farooq, Ansari and Syed Ali Shah Geelani were arrested after they tried to lead a march towards Eidgah in Srinagar. Thousands of people protested against their arrest.

=== 2018 ===
On 15 October 2018, a day after Ansari was again detained by the police during local elections, thousands of Shias from Mirgund, Rambail, Matipora and its adjoining areas staged a protest while blocking the Srinagar Muzaffarbad Highway at Mirgund Pattan on Sunday.

=== 2019 ===
Ansari, Abdul Gani Bhat and Bilal Lone were denied permission to meet Hurriyat chairman Mirwaiz Umar Farooq, after he had been detained under house arrest following the abrogation of Article 370 on 5 August 2019 at his Nigeen residence.

In September 2019, Molana Masroor Abbas was also put under house arrest on Ashura. Thousands of his followers protested against the detention. Jammu and Kashmir Police would later release Ansari in August 2020.

On 9th Muharram, he urged the authorities to release all religious leaders, lift the ban on the traditional Ashura processions and allow Friday prayers at Srinagar's historic Jamia Masjid without any hindrance. In 2023, Ashura processions in Kashmir were held in Srinigar.

Several JKIM leaders were expelled from the party by Ansari after they joined the Jammu and Kashmir Apni Party led by Altaf Bukhari.

=== 2025 ===
In 2025, the Ministry of Home Affairs under Amit Shah declared two Jammu and Kashmir-based separatist political parties -- Awami Action Committee headed by Hurriyat chairman Mirwaiz Umar Farooq and JKIM headed by Ansari -- as unlawful associations and banned them for promoting the insurgency in Jammu and Kashmir.

== See also ==
- Mohammad Abbas Ansari
- Mustafa Hussain Ansari
- Ghulam Rasool Noori
