= All Parties Hurriyat Conference =

Political alliance in Kashmir

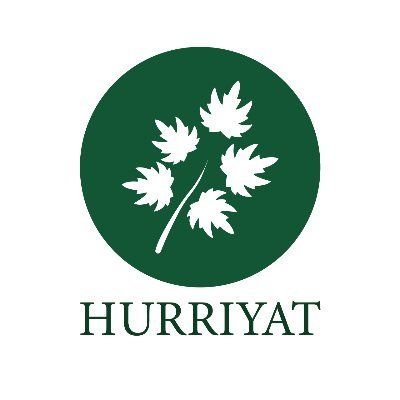
- Chairperson: Mirwaiz Umar Farooq (Mirwaiz faction); Masarat Alam Bhat (Geelani faction; interim)
- Founders: Mirwaiz Umar Farooq; Syed Ali Shah Geelani; Sheikh Abdul Aziz; Mohammad Abbas Ansari; Yasin Malik; Abdul Gani Bhat
- Founded: 31 July 1993
- Preceded by: Muslim United Front
- Headquarters: Srinagar
- Ideology: Kashmiri separatism Self-determination; Islamism
- Political position: Big tent
- Colors: Green

Website
- www.huriyatconference.com

All Parties Hurriyat Conference (APHC) is an alliance of several political, social and religious organizations formed on 9 March 1993, as a united political front to raise the cause of Kashmiri independence in the Kashmir conflict. Mehmood Ahmed Saghar was the first convener of the APHC-PAK chapter when the alliance was established in 1993. The alliance has historically been viewed positively by Pakistan as it contests the claim of the Indian government over the State of Jammu and Kashmir. The organisation is split into two main factions, the Mirwaiz and Geelani factions. Mirwaiz Umar Farooq is the founder and chairman of Mirwaiz faction and Masarat Alam Bhat is the interim chairman of Geelani faction, who succeeded Syed Ali Shah Geelani, the founder of the faction after his death.

== History ==
The All Parties Hurriyat Conference was founded on 31 July 1993. On 27 December 1992, the 19-year-old Mirwaiz Umar Farooq, who had taken over as chairman of J&K Awami Action Committee (J&KAAC) and become the head priest of Kashmir after the assassination of his father Mirwaiz Farooq, called a meeting of religious, social and political organisations at Mirwaiz Manzil leading to the creation of the formation the following year.

The APHC executive council had seven members from seven executive parties: Syed Ali Shah Geelani of Jamat-e-Islami, Mirwaiz Umar Farooq of Awami Action Committee, Sheikh Abdul Aziz of People’s League, Moulvi Mohammad Abbas Ansari of Ittehad-ul-Muslimeen, Prof Abdul Gani Bhat of Muslim Conference, Yasin Malik of JKLF, and Abdul Gani Lone of People’s Conference.

Now, the leadership of the some executive parties have changed with time like Mukhtar Ahmed Waza of people's league, Masroor Abbas Ansari of Ittehad-ul-Muslimeen and Bilal Ghani lone of people's conference, renamed as JK peoples independent movement

== Ideology and role ==
According to the Hurriyat, Jammu and Kashmir is a disputed territory and India's control of it is not justified. It supports the Pakistani claim that Kashmir is the "unfinished agenda of Partition" and needs to be solved "as per the aspirations of the people of Jammu and Kashmir."

The APHC perceives itself to be the sole representative of the Kashmiri people.

The organisation's primary role has been to project an image of counter-insurgency operations in Jammu and Kashmir and to mobilise public opinion against Indian security forces. The alliance has consistently followed up local allegations of security force excesses, and in several documented cases, false allegations about human violation by Indian security forces. For instance, the Haigam firing incident of 16 February 2001, was an assault on a peaceful gathering whereas, but later claimed in news reports and official clarifications, the army contingent fired upon the mob only when they were blocked and prevented from moving.

The APHC has also an observer's status in the Organisation of Islamic Cooperation (OIC). OIC has invited Mirwaiz Umar Farooq for its June 2005 Foreign Ministers Conference in Yemen.

== Internal Split ==
There are currently two main factions of the Hurriyat Conference, formed by Mirwaiz Umar Farooq and Syed Ali Shah Geelani. The Mirwaiz-led group, also referred to as the "moderate faction" along with non-Hurriyat leaders like Yasin Malik undertook, between 2–16 June 2005, the first formal visit of Kashmiri separatists to Pakistani Kashmir and subsequently, though unsanctioned by Indian authorities, to Pakistan.

Internal fissures within the Hurriyat Conference culminated in a formal split on 7 September 2003, with at least 12 of its 26 constituents "removing" the then Chairman Maulana Mohammad Abbas Ansari "replacing" him with Masarat Alam as its interim chief. The dissenters reportedly met at the residence of hardliner and pro-Pakistan Jamaat-e-Islami (JeI) leader Syed Ali Shah Geelani and decided to depose Ansari and "suspend" the seven-member executive committee, the highest decision-making forum of the APHC. A five-member committee was formed to review the Hurriyat Constitution and suggest amendments to reverse what the dissenters perceived as "autocratic" decisions taken by the executive committee.

Following this, Geelani formed his own faction of the Hurriyat called All Party Hurriyat Conference (G) and took over its leadership in 2003. He was later appointed as its lifetime chairman. It consists of 24 parties. In 2004 he founded his own party named Tehreek-e-Hurriyat due to differences with the Jamaat-e-Islami. He was appointed as the party chairman in October 2004.

The Hurriyat Conference again split in 2014. The moderate Hurriyat Conference led by Mirwaiz Umar Farooq faced the split after four senior leaders raised a banner of revolt against the chairman and other members of the conglomerate. Democratic Freedom Party president Shabir Ahmad Shah, National Front chairman Nayeem Ahmad Khan, Mahaz-e-Azadi chief Mohammad Azam Inqlabi and Islamic Political Party Mohommad Yousuf Naqash were up in arms against Mirwaiz after he dashed off a letter to the convener in Pakistan administered Kashmir, Mohommad Yousuf Naseem, asking him not to entertain the leaders who have left the conglomerate on their own. The leader Shabir Shah and his lieutenant Nayeem Khan along with Shia leader Agha Hassan joined Hurriyat Conference (G) led by Syed Ali Geelani.

== Views on right to self-determination ==
All JKLF factions support the right to self-determination as per UN Security Council Resolution 47. Hurriyat, led by Syed Ali Shah Geelani, Shabir Shah, Nayeem Khan & Azam Inquilabi, demand the right to self-determination as per UN Security Council Resolution 47. Members of the Executive Council of the original APHC were:

- Peoples Conference: Abdul Ghani Lone
- Jamat-e-Islami: Syed Ali Shah Geelani
- Awami Action Committee: Mirwaiz Umar Farooq
- People's League: Mukhtar Ahmed Waza
- Itehad-ul-Muslimeen: Mohammad Abbas Ansari
- Muslim Conference: Abdul Ghani Bhat
- JKLF: Yasin Malik

== Criticism and controversies ==
=== Relations with Pakistan and Afghanistan ===
Sheikh Mustafa Kamal, a senior leader of the Jammu & Kashmir National Conference and son of Sheikh Abdullah criticised Hurriyat leader Syed Ali Shah Geelani for working on "dictations" given by Pakistan. He accused Geelani of being "a double agent" on "the payroll of Pakistan's ISI".

Kamal said "Geelani has tried to 'ignite and incite' people by 'hollow slogans and destructive emotionalism', whenever even a Pakistani clerk comes to India and summons this ex-lawmaker(Geelani), he rushes to Delhi to take dictation about how to ensure that uncertainty prevails in the state."

Pakistan also openly supported Geelani and Hurriyat, and representatives have had several meetings with Hurriyat leaders. A three-member delegation from the Pakistan High Commission led by Abdul Basit met Geelani at his Malviya Nagar residence in March 2015. Pakistan High Commissioner Abdul Basit assured Geelani of complete support conveying that the country's stand on Kashmir remains unchanged despite the regime change in New Delhi. Basit also invited Geelani for a Pakistan Day function on 23 March. The Pakistan High Commission in New Delhi, ritually invites pro-separatist leadership of Jammu and Kashmir for the function every year.

Indian media vehicles reported that Geelani and Hurriyat are paying local unemployed young men to stage protests. According to them, arrested participants confessed being paid Rs 400($6–7) every Friday. Police said the money is being raised locally by Hurriyat hardliner Syed Ali Shah Geelani's followers. Most of the money comes from fruit markets and saw mills, Pakistan-based LeT militants also participate in stone peltings, the police said.

=== Bans by Indian government ===
In December 2023, the Tehreek-e-Hurriyat party was banned for five years by the union government of India under the Unlawful Activities (Prevention) Act (UAPA), stating that it wanted to separate Jammu and Kashmir from India, establish an Islamic state, spread anti-Indian propaganda and supported terrorism. The Muslim League Jammu Kashmir faction led by Masarat Alam Bhat, a constituent of Geelani's Hurriyat faction, was also banned for five years on similar grounds.

The Muslim Conference, Jammu and Kashmir factions led by Abdul Ghani Bhat and Ghulam Nabi Sumji, constitutents of Farooq's Hurriyat faction, were banned in February 2024 for five years. Farooq's own party Awami Action Committee and the Jammu and Kashmir Ittihadul Muslimeen led by Masroor Abbas Ansari were banned for five years in March 2025 for promoting terrorism and separatism.

=== Elections boycott ===
Geelani and Hurriyat appealed to the people of Kashmir to boycott the 2014 Jammu and Kashmir Legislative Assembly elections completely, arguing that: "India has been holding elections in the Valley using the power of gun and so such an exercise is not legitimate." But despite repeated boycott appeals, the 2014 assembly election recorded record voter turnout of more than 65% which was the highest in 25 years of history and higher than normal voting percentages in other states of India.

While voter turnout in Jammu and Kashmir as a whole was high, it remained low in Kashmir, and in many thickly populated areas of Srinagar and Anantnag, it stayed considerably below the norm, reaching close to 20% in some of them. This trend continued and became much worse during the 2019 Lok Sabha election in JK, where Srinagar and Anantnag recorded voter turnout of 15.6% and 9.7% each respectively.

Member of the European Parliament Kosma Zlotowski welcomed the smooth conduct of the State Legislative Elections in the Jammu and Kashmir. Zlotowski's office in its message said that: "The high voter turnout figure proves that democracy is firmly rooted in India. The EU would like to congratulate India and its democratic system for conduct of fair elections, unmarred by violence, in the state of Jammu and Kashmir [...] The European Parliament also takes cognizance of the fact that a large number of Kashmiri voters turned out despite calls for the boycott of elections by certain separatist forces."

== Current members ==
Current members of All Parties Hurriyat Conference include:

| Number | Party | Leader |
|---|---|---|
| 1 | Aawami Action Committee | Mirwaiz Umar Farooq |
| 2 | People's League | Mukhtar Ahmed Waza |
| 3 | Anjamani Auqafi Jama Masjid | Mohammad Umar Farooq |
| 4 | Anjaman-e-Tablig-ul Islam | Syed Qasim Shah Bukhari |
| 5 | Ummat Islami | Qazi Ghulam Mohammad |
| 6 | Jammu & Kashmir Ittihadul Muslimeen | Maulana Masroor Abbas Ansari |
| 7 | Anjuman e shari shiyan | Aga Syed Hassan al-moosvi Al-safvi |
| 8 | Jammu Kashmir National Front | Nayeem Ahmed Khan |
| 9 | All Jammu & Kashmir Employees' Confederation | Ishtiaq Qadri |
| 10 | Jamiate Ulama-E-Islam | Abdul Gani Azhari |
| 11 | Jamiat-e-Hamdania | Mirwaiz Moulana Muhammad Yaseen Hamdani |
| 12 | Jammu and Kashmir People's Conference | Abdul Ghani Lone till 2002 assassination |
| 13 | Jammu Kashmir Liberation Front | Muhammad Yasin Malik |
| 14 | Jammu and Kashmir Democratic Freedom Party | Shabir Shah & Mehmood Ahmed Saghar |
| 15 | Jammu and Kashmir People's Basic Rights (Protection) Committee | Mufti Bahauddin Farouqi |
| 16 | Liberation Council | Azhar Bhat |
| 17 | Kashmir Bazme Tawheed | Tajamul Bhat |
| 18 | Kashmir Bar Association | Zaroon bhat |
| 19 | Muslim Khawateen Markaz | Zaid Bhat/ Anjum Zamarud Habib |
| 20 | Muslim Conference | Khokhar e aazam |
| 21 | Tehreek-e-Hurriyat Kashmiri | Saqib Bhat |
| 22 | Jammu and Kashmir People's Independent Movement | Bilal Ghani Lone |
| 23 | Peoples Political Party | Eng Hilal Ahmad War |
| 24 | Imam Ahmad Raza Islamic Mission | Rafeeq Ahmad Mir |
| 25 | Saut-Ul-Aliya | Moulana Abdul Rashid Dawoodi |
| 26 | Jammu and Kashmir People's Freedom League | Muhammad Farooq Rehmani |
| 27 | Peoples Political Party Hilal Ahmed War for Azad Jammu and Kashmir n Pakistan chapter | Mian Muzaffar Shah |
| 28 | Dukhtaran-e-Millat | Asiya Andrabi |
| 29 | J & K Muslim League | Masarat Alam |
| 30 | Difa-e-Pakistan Council | Sami ul Haq |
| 31 | Jammu and Kashmir Human Rights Committee | Noor-Ul-Hassan |
| 32 | Employees and Workers Confederation | Mohiuddin |
| 33 | Majlis-e-Tehfuz-ul-Islam | |
| 34 | Muslim Zone Employees Front | |
| 35 | Unjman-e-Itehad-e-Muslimeen Tral | |
| 36 | Muslim Employees Front | |
| 37 | Shia Rabitta Committee | |
| 38 | Jammu Kashmir Peoples Party | Sardar Hassan Ibrahim Khan |
| 39 | Milli Muslim League | Saifullah Khalid Kasuri |
| 40 | Tehreek-e-Azaadi Jammu and Kashmir | Ghazi Shahzad |
| 41 | Majlis-e Ahrar-e Islam | Syed Muhammad Kafeel Bukhari |

Hurriyat Conference has three factions: Hurriyat led by Syed Ali Shah Geelani, Hurriyat led by Mirwaiz Umar Farooq, and Hurriyat led by Shabir Shah, Azam Inquilabi & Nayeem Khan. Jammu Kashmir Liberation Front is not part of these factions.

== See also ==
- Syed Ali Shah Geelani
- Mirwaiz Umar Farooq
- Abdul Gani Lone
- Mukhtar Ahmed Waza
- Mohammad Abbas Ansari
