= Mirwaiz Umar Farooq =

Kashmiri religious leader (born 1973)

Mirwaiz Mohammad Umar Farooq
- میرواعظ عمر فاروق
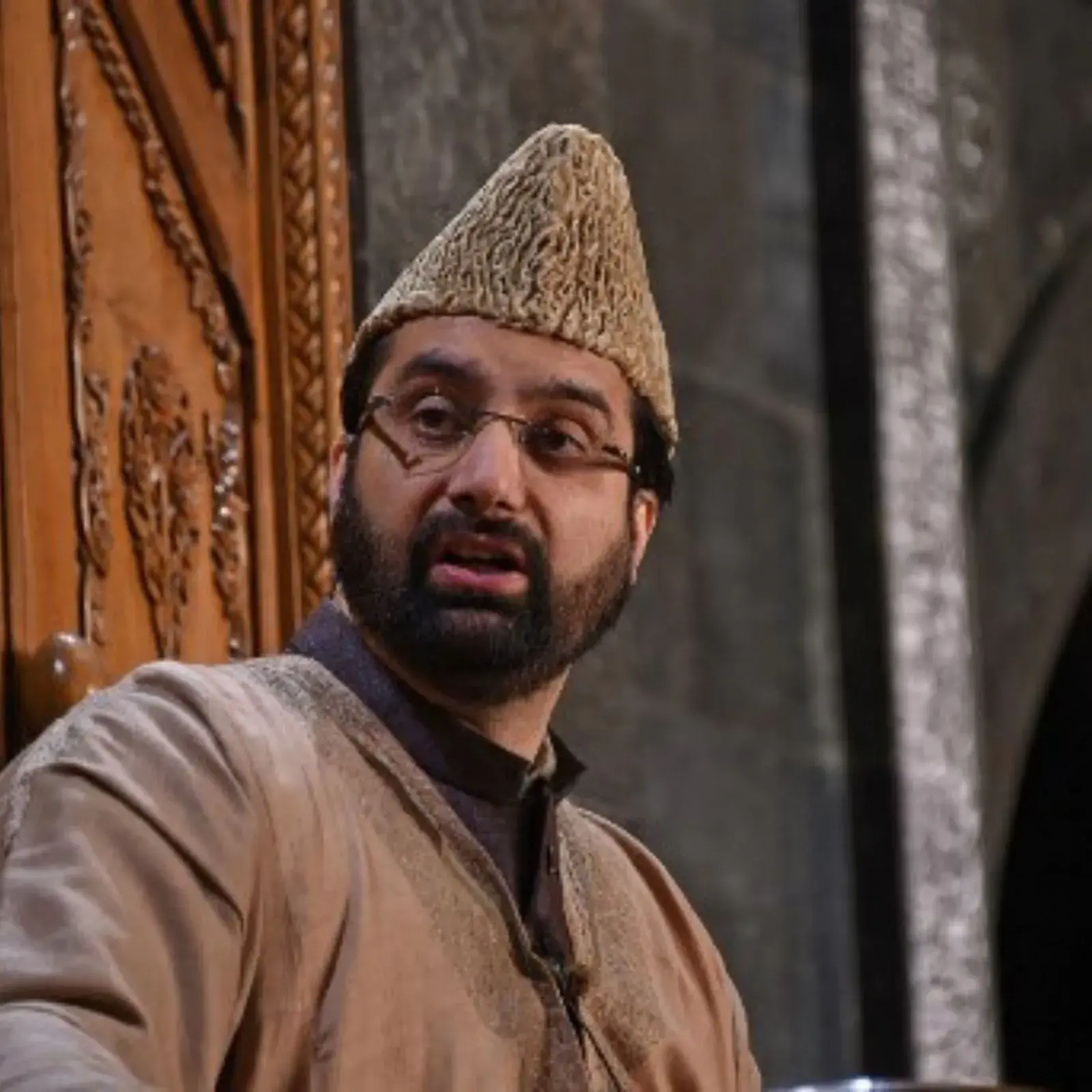

Mirwaiz of Kashmir
- Incumbent
- Assumed office 21 May 1990
- Preceded by: Mirwaiz Maulvi Farooq

Chairman of All Parties Hurriyat Conference
- In office 1993–1998
- Preceded by: position established
- Succeeded by: Syed Ali Shah Geelani

Chairman of All Parties Hurriyat Conference (Mirwaiz faction)
- Incumbent
- Assumed office 2004
- Preceded by: Mohammad Abbas Ansari

Personal details
- Born: 23 March 1973 (age 53) Srinagar, Jammu and Kashmir, India
- Party: Hurriyat (Mirwaiz faction); Awami Action Committee
- Spouse: Sheeba Masoodi (m. 2002)
- Children: Three
- Parent: Mirwaiz Maulvi Farooq (father)
- Education: Burn Hall School, University of Kashmir, Jamia Millia Islamia
- Occupation: Kashmiri separatist leader and religious cleric

Mirwaiz Mohammad Umar Farooq (Kashmiri: میرواعظ عمر فاروق; born 23 March 1973) is the 14th Mirwaiz of Kashmir. He is a Kashmiri separatist political leader. He is also an Islamic religious cleric of Kashmir Valley. He is officially an Indian citizen and has held an Indian Passport.

In October 2014, Farooq was listed as one of The 500 Most Influential Muslims by the Royal Islamic Strategic Studies Centre, Jordan. He came in the list for the 11th time in a row, in the year 2024.

As the Mirwaiz of Kashmir and chairman of the All Parties Hurriyat Conference, Umar Farooq has an important religious and political role in the Kashmir Valley. He is seen as the spiritual leader of Kashmir's Muslims. Farooq served as the chairman of the All Parties Hurriyat Conference from 1993 to 1998, and after its split has served as the chairman of his own faction since 2004.

== Early life ==
At the age of 17, following the assassination of his father by unknown gunmen, Mirwaiz Maulvi Farooq, the leader of the Awami Action Committee, Farooq united 23 Kashmiri pro-freedom organizations into the All Parties Hurriyat Conference (APHC). Mirwaiz Maulvi Farooq's funeral procession on 21 May 1990, witnessed the bloodshed near the Islamia College, wherein 72 people, including four women, were killed; his body was dropped in the middle of the road. This roused public sentiment and gave leverage to Mirwaiz Umar Farooq's political work in the valley. He has constantly tried to raise awareness about the Kashmir issue internationally. He was also shown among the Asian Heroes by Time magazine. He maintains that dialogue must take place with India and Pakistan, so long as the Kashmiri aspirations are heard as well.

He became the 14th Mirwaiz (Kashmiri term for the traditional preacher of Muslims in Kashmir) on 30 May 1990. Rediff On The NeT's Chindu Sreedharan interviewed him in 1997, in which he described the role of Mirwaiz in Kashmir politics:-

"My family played a major role in evolving politics here. The first party, the Muslim Conference, was established in the valley in 1931. My great grandfather, the then Mirwaiz headed it. In fact, it was he who introduced Sheikh Abdullah to the people. Later, Abdullah formed the Jammu & Kashmir National Conference and my grandfather was exiled to Pakistan where he died".

"My father then took over. In 1963, he formed another party -- the People's Action Committee -- which stood for giving people their basic rights. Till 1990 when he was assassinated, he was campaigning for that cause. So all along, the political role has been present in the institution of the Mirwaiz."

== Education ==
Before joining Kashmir politics, Umar Farooq was an alumnus of Burn Hall School in Srinagar. He had an interest in computer science and wanted to become a software engineer. He holds a postgraduate degree in Islamic Studies called ‘Moulvi Fazil’, and a PhD from the Jamia Millia Islamia, on the topic "Politico-Islamic role of Shah-e-Hamdan", a 14th-century Islamic scholar who introduced Islam in the Valley.

== Political career ==
The All Parties Hurriyat Conference, an alliance of Kashmiri political and social organisations seeking a referendum, was formed in September 1993 and Farooq was elected as its first chairman due to it consisting mostly of secular organisations, despite Syed Ali Shah Geelani being the initial choice. Geelani replaced him as chairman of the organisation in 1998.

The appointment of Mohammad Abbas Ansari as chairman precipitated a crisis in the Hurriyat and it split in September 2003 with the breakaway faction electing Geelani as its chairman. Farooq was appointed by the faction led by Ansari to try to re-unify the organisation. Ansari resigned from his position on 7 July 2004 and Farooq was appointed as the interim chairman in his place. Farooq however stated that he would not take over the position and only the executive council will appoint one after being formed. He accepted the position after being appointed by the executive council on 8 August 2004. He was re-elected as chairman of the faction for two years in 2006, and 2009.

=== 2016 arrest ===
Farooq was arrested when he marched towards Eidgah on Friday. A statement issued by Hurriyat Conference (m) said that in accordance with the joint resistance program of the ‘Eidgah Chalo’ today, Mirwaiz Umar Farooq was detained outside his Nigeen residence as soon as he tried to march towards ‘Eidgah. Earlier, Syed Ali Geelani too was arrested. After than Jammu & Kashmir Ittihadul Muslimeen president Maulana Masroor Abbas Ansari was arrested by police from his residence at Nawa Kadal before Friday prayers. He had tried to lead march towards Eidgah. Then thousands of people protest in Srinagar for their leaders arrest.

=== 2019 arrest ===
On 4 August 2019, Mirwaiz was put under house arrest, a day before the Union government revoked the special status of the erstwhile state into two union territories. A report published by India Today, on September 20, 2019 stated that Moderate Hurriyat leader Mirwaiz Umar Farooq, signed bond to secure his release.

On 22 September 2023, he was released from house arrest, after over 4 years in incarceration in his Srinagar residence. A week before his release, high court, had issued a notice asking the Jammu and Kashmir administration to respond to a Habeas Corpus petition challenging the “illegal confinement” of Mirwaiz Umar Farooq.

Since his house arrest on 4 August 2019, Mirwaiz was continuously disallowed from conducting sermon and offering Friday prayers for 212 consecutive Fridays, until his release on 22 September 2023 by Jammu and Kashmir administration, after over 4 years and was allowed to lead prayers at Jamia Masjid, Srinagar. Mirwaiz addressed a large gathering in Jamia Masjid. Referring to Prime Minister Narendra Modi, Mirwaiz said that "this was not an era of war".

On 15 October 2023, he was again put under house arrest and barred from offering Friday prayers.

=== Banning of AAC ===
Farooq's party Awami Action Committee was banned for five years in March 2025 under the Unlawful Activities (Prevention) Act (UAPA) for promoting terrorism and separatism. The ban was upheld by two tribunals in September 2025. As a result, Farooq was forced to remove his designation as chairman of All Parties Hurriyat Conference from his X profile by the union government of India in December 2025.

== Clash with central government ==
The Ministry of Home Affairs (MHA) on 12 March 2025 declared two Jammu and Kashmir-based parties—Awami Action Committee headed by Hurriyat Conference chairman and cleric Mirwaiz Umar Farooq and Jammu and Kashmir Ittihadul Muslimeen (JKIM) chairman and shia leader Maulana Masroor Abbas Ansari—as unlawful associations and banned them with immediate effect for a period of next five years.

"Jammu & Kashmir Ittihadul Muslimeen and Awami Action Committee have been declared unlawful associations under UAPA. These organisations were found inciting people to cause law and order situations, posing a threat to the unity and integrity of Bharat," Union Home Minister Amit Shah posted on X.

He said that anyone found involved in activities against the nation's peace, order and sovereignty is bound to face the "crushing blow" of the Modi government. The Home Ministry, in its official order, stated that JKIM, chaired by Masroor Abbas Ansari, is indulging was unlawful activities, which were prejudicial to the integrity, sovereignty and security of the country. "The members of the JKIM have remained involved in supporting terrorist activities and anti-India propaganda for fuelling secessionism in Jammu and Kashmir," the order read. Similarly, for AAC, the MHA said its members have remained involved in supporting terrorist activities and anti-India propaganda to fuel secessionism in J&K. “The leaders and members of the AAC have been involved in mobilising funds for perpetrating unlawful activities including supporting secessionist, separatist and terrorist activities in J&K,” the notification read.

It stated that different FIRs have been registered against Umar Farooq for anti-India speeches and for supporting bandh calls and calling for polls boycott. According to the notification, the Central government is of the opinion that if there is no immediate curb or control of the unlawful activities of the AAC, it will use this opportunity to continue these and advocate secession of J&K while disputing its accession to the Union of India. The Centre alleged that the leaders and members of JKIM have been involved in "mobilising funds" for perpetrating unlawful activities, including supporting secessionist, separatist and terrorist activities in Jammu and Kashmir. The Ministry said JKIM members showed sheer disrespect towards the constitutional authority and constitutional set up of the country. "The JKIM involved in promoting and aiding the secession of Jammu and Kashmir from India by indulging in anti-national and subversive activities; sowing seeds of discontent among the people; inciting people to destabilise law and order, encouraging the use of arms to cause secession of Jammu and Kashmir from the Union of India and promoting hatred against the established Government," the order read. The MHA said that the Central Government is firmly of the opinion that having regard to the activities of the Jammu and Kashmir Ittehadul Muslimeen (JKIM), it is necessary to declare the JKIM as an unlawful association with immediate effect.

== Personal life ==
Farooq has been married to Indian-American Sheeba Masoodi since 2002. They have three children.

Sheeba Masoodi is the youngest daughter of Sibtain Masoodi, a doctor from the Barzulla locality of Srinagar (famous for its Bone and Joints Hospital), who settled in Buffalo, New York in the early 70s.

== See also ==
- All Parties Hurriyat Conference
- Mirwaiz
- MaulanaMohammad Abbas Ansari
- Syed Ali Shah Geelani
- Maulana Masroor Abbas Ansari
