= Hizbul Momineen =

Kashmiri Militant Organisation

Hizbul Momineen is a former militant group in Jammu and Kashmir that exclusively recruited from the Shia Muslim community. Formed in the 1990s, it has remained largely inactive in recent years and is primarily known for historical developments in the region.

The founder of the Kashmiri Shia militant and political group Hizbul Momineen is Mohammad Abbas Ansari, with Shuja Abbas serving as its first active commander.

Iftikhar Hussain Ansari was thrice the target of unsuccessful assassination attempts. In June 2000, Ansari barely escaped the explosion of a landmine while addressing a religious congregation at Gund Khwaja Qasim. The blast killed twelve of his followers. On 1 September 2000, Ansari was injured by an IED explosion that killed two policemen and a driver. Police suspected the Hizbul Momineen, a terrorist organisation led by Mohammad Abbas Ansari and Ghulam Rasool Noori.
