= Muslim United Front =

Kashmiri political coalition

- Abbreviation: MUF
- Leader: Syed Ali Shah Geelani (JIK); Mohammad Abbas Ansari (JKIM); Abdul Ghani Lone (JKPC); Yasin Malik (JKLF)
- Founder: Mohammad Abbas Ansari; Ghulam Qadir Wani; Qazi Nisar; Abdul Gani Bhat; Ghulam Mohammad Bhat
- Founded: 2 September 1986
- Succeeded by: All Parties Hurriyat Conference
- Headquarters: Srinagar
- Ideology: Kashmiriyat; Islamism; Regionalism; Muslim nationalism Factions: Islamic socialism Islamic fundamentalism
- Political position: Big tent
- Religion: Islam
- Members: Jamaat-e-Islami Kashmir; Jammu & Kashmir Ittihadul Muslimeen; Jammu Kashmir Liberation Front; Jammu and Kashmir People's Conference; Jammu and Kashmir People's League; Ummat-e-Islami; Jammu and Kashmir Muslim League; Kashmir Bazme Tawheed; Jamiate Ulama-E-Islam; Jammu Kashmir National Front; Jamiat-e-Hamdania; Anjuman e shari shiyan; Anjamani Auqafi Jama Masjid; Anjaman-e-Tablig-ul Islam; Majlis-e-Tehfuz-ul-Islam; Muslim Zone Employees Front; Shia Rabitta Committee; Unjman-e-Itehad-e-Muslimeen Tral; Muslim Employees Front
- Jammu and Kashmir Legislative Assembly (1987): 4 / 76

The Muslim United Front (MUF) was a 'polyglot coalition' of Islamic Kashmiri political parties that contested the 1987 Jammu and Kashmir Legislative Assembly election in the erstwhile Indian state of Jammu and Kashmir. The Jamaat-e-Islami of Jammu and Kashmir was a key constituent party of the coalition. The MUF won four Assembly seats in the 1987 election. However, widespread rigging of the election by the ruling National Conference party was reported. In the absence of such rigging, commentators believe that it could have won fifteen to twenty seats, a contention admitted by the National Conference leader Farooq Abdullah.

The disaffection caused by the election gave rise to the Kashmir insurgency, which continues to this day.

The present day Hurriyat Conference is largely inspired by the former MUF coalition.

== Background ==
In 1986, the ruling National Conference, widely accused of corruption, came to an accord with Indian National Congress Party which threatened to erode what remained of Kashmir's autonomy. Moreover, the growing emphasis on secularism led to a backlash with Islamic parties becoming more popular. The key players among these parties were the Jamaat-e-Islami Kashmir and its student wing, Islami Jamiat-i Tulaba.

== Formation of Muslim United Front ==
In response to these issues was formed the MUF, which attracted support from separatists, youth and the pro-Pakistan Jamaat-e-Islami. MUF's election manifesto stressed the need to solve all outstanding issues according to the Simla Agreement, work for Islamic unity and against political interference from the centre. Their slogan in public rallies was wanting the law of the Quran in the Assembly.

The Islamic political coalition mobilized support on the basis of Kashmiriyat. The movement's grassroots campaign was said to be 'enthusiastically energetic', attracting youth activists who had been born in the 1960s. A Pandit activist recorded in her memoirs that there had been a 'wave' in favour of the MUF in early 1987 in the Valley.

== 1987 election and rigging ==
The 1987 election witnessed the highest record of voters participation, with eighty per cent of the people in the Valley having voted.

The election of 1987 were considered to be the most compromised in the history of Jammu and Kashmir. Voting was held in the Valley on 23 March 1987 and a Delhi-based magazine reported that strong arms tactics and rigging were used all over the Valley and gangs took over the polling stations forcibly and ballot boxes were pre-stamped in favour of the National Conference.

The MUF won in only 4 of the 43 electoral constituencies it had contested, although it received a vote share of 31.9%. (Note: The Muslim United Front polled 470,580 votes by the official count, out of 1,477,250 votes cast in the Valley, representing 31.9% vote share. Its share of votes in the whole state was 18.9%.) Scholar Victoria Schofield has stated that the MUF might have won four more seats if there was no electoral fraud. On the other hand, an anonymous source in the Intelligence Bureau has advanced the estimate that the MUF may have lost approximately 13 seats due to electoral malpractice.

The elections were allegedly rigged in favour of Abdullah, Most commentators state that this led to the rise of an armed insurgency movement composed, in part, of those who unfairly lost the elections In July 1988, a series of demonstrations, strikes, and attacks on the Indian government effectively marked the beginning of the insurgency in Jammu and Kashmir, which escalated into the most severe security issue in India during the 1990s.

== Aftermath ==
The MUF officially rejected the result of elections saying that the elections are rigged in the favour of Farooq Abdullah and called for an free and fair investigation but instead of punishing those responsible for the rigging the Indian government arrested and tortured the MUF activists, According to Bose the number of activists arrested and tortured was in the hundreds and possibly thousands. Most of them were kept in custody until late 1987 or early 1988, Among those activists arrested was Yasin Malik and Mohammad Yusuf Shah, Then in 1988 as a retaliation the MUF organised a series of demonstrations, strikes and attacks against government playing a crucial role in transforming spontaneous, decentralized opposition to Indian rule into a full-fledged insurgency, The MUF used distinctly Islamic themes to mobilise crowds and justify their use of violence sought to establish an Islamic democratic state where the rights of minorities would be protected according to Quran and Sunnah and the economy would be organised on the principles of Islamic socialism also seek the separation of Jammu and Kashmir from Indian administration.

Many younger supporters of MUF started to support and joining the militant organisations which had up till the election seen a wane in their support and numerical strength. According to Maulana Abbas Ansari, a member of the Muslim United Front, "The youth would have not picked up the gun nor have known of Nehru's promise of a plebiscite to the people of Kashmir had the election not been rigged". At the same time, Iran's Islamic Revolution and the victory of Mujahideen in Soviet-Afghan war caused major influence and impact on the Kashmir conflict and added extra confidence and comfort in the Revolt and armed insurgency against Indian administration also evolved the narrative of the Kashmir conflict by steering the struggle away from nationalism and towards Jihadism as many Kashmiri separatist groups including MUF coalition had adopted religious politics by promoting Islamism, Islamic socialism and Islamic fundamentalism in the Self-determine concept of Kashmiriyat against Indian administration rather than nationalist separatism or aspects of Ethnonationationist Political Autonomy.

Scholars see that the rise in the organisation's support caused the Congress-National Conference alliance to rig the 1987 election.

== Bibliography ==
- Amin, Tahir (2016), "The Kashmir Question" (PDF), in Abdulrahim Ali; Iba Der Thiam; Yusof A. Talib (eds.), Islam in the World Today, Part 1 (The Different Aspects of Islamic Culture, Volume 6), UNESCO Publishing, pp. 349–368
- Bose, Sumantra (2003), Kashmir: Roots of Conflict, Paths to Peace, Harvard University Press, ISBN 0-674-01173-2
- Bose, Sumantra (2013), "The Kashmir Question", Transforming India, Harvard University Press, pp. 225–, ISBN 978-0-674-72819-6
- Johnson, Rob (2005), A Region in Turmoil: South Asian Conflicts Since 1947, Reaktion Books, ISBN 978-1-86189-257-7
- Grover, Verinder; Arora, Ranjana, eds. (1996). Encyclopaedia of India and Her States: Himachal Pradesh, Jammu & Kashmir and Punjab. Deep & Deep. ISBN 978-81-7100-723-3.
- Schofield, Victoria (2003) [First published in 2000], Kashmir in Conflict, London and New York: I. B. Taurus & Co, ISBN 1860648983
- Widmalm, Sten (November 1997), "The Rise and Fall of Democracy in Jammu and Kashmir", Asian Survey, 37 (11): 1005–1030, doi:10.2307/2645738, JSTOR 2645738
- Widmalm, Sten (2014) [first published 2002], Kashmir in Comparative Perspective: Democracy and Violent Separatism in India, Routledge, ISBN 978-1-136-86694-4
