= Mohammad Abbas Ansari =

Kashmiri Militant Leader

Quaid-e-Itthad Maulana Mohammad Abbas Ansari
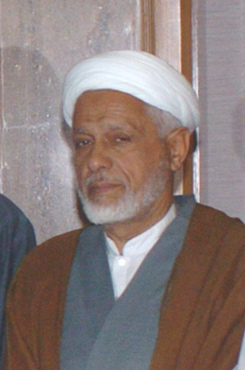

Chairman of Jammu & Kashmir Ittihadul Muslimeen (JKIM)
- In office 31 March 1962 – 25 October 2022
- Preceded by: Position Established
- Succeeded by: Masroor Abbas Ansari

Personal life
- Born: 17 August 1936 Srinagar, Jammu and Kashmir, British Raj
- Died: 25 October 2022 (aged 86) Srinagar, Jammu and Kashmir, India
- Children: Masroor Abbas Ansari, Nasir Abbas Ansari & 3 daughters
- Parent: Molvi Hassan Ansari (father)
- Political party: JKIM; APHC; MUF; Hizbul Momineen
- Education: Oriental College, Srinagar, Sultanul Madaris, Lucknow, Houza Ilmia Najaf, Najaf, Iraq.
- Known for: Founder of Jammu & Kashmir Ittihadul Muslimeen (JKIM) & Hizbul Momineen
- Occupation: Religious Shia Scholar and Moderate Separatist Leader
- Website: https://ittihadul.tripod.com

Religious life
- Religion: Islam
- Denomination: Usuli Shia Twelver
- School: Ja'fari jurisprudence
- Sect: Pan Islamic Unity in Kashmir

Muslim leader
- Post: Chairman of Ittihadul Muslimeen

Mohammad Abbas Ansari (Urdu: محمد عباس انصاری) (17 August 1936 – 25 October 2022) was a separatist political leader and a well known Shia Muslim scholar, reformer, preacher and cleric from Indian-administered Jammu and Kashmir. He was known for his religious lectures and as a Kashmiri separatist, ex-chairman of the All Parties Hurriyat Conference, also founder and chairman of the Ittihadul Muslimeen also known as Jammu & Kashmir Ittihadul Muslimeen (JKIM), a Kashmiri nationalist Shia separatist political party which aims for Shi'a–Sunni unity in Kashmir & independence of Jammu and Kashmir from India through peaceful struggle. He is considered a moderate and has called for an end to violence in that region. He is Succeeded by his son Maulana Masroor Abbas Ansari.

== Early life and education ==
Abbas was born on 18 August 1936, in Srinagar to the influential Ansari family. After his preliminary education at a local school in Srinagar, he graduated from the Oriental College in Srinagar. In 1950, he left for further studies in Lucknow, the centre of Islamic theological education in India. After spending years in Lucknow's Sultanul Madaris, he undertook higher studies in Najaf, Iraq, commencing in 1954. He majored in Arabic literature, Philosophy, Hadith and Tafseer, Islamic Jurisprudence and Political Science. After eight years of study in Iraq he returned to Kashmir and launched a religio-political monthly magazine named "Safeena".

== Entry in politics ==
On 27 March 1962 Abbas founded the political party "Jammu & Kashmir Ittihadul Muslimeen" (JKIM) with the main object of keeping the various sects of Muslims united. JKIM also works for the political, social and economic welfare of Muslims and demands a UN-supervised plebiscite in Kashmir in accordance with the UN resolutions of 1948 and 1949.

Abbas appeared on the political scene of Kashmir in December 1963 amidst the Holy Relic Movement when people clandestinely lifted a relic of Muhammad from Hazratbal Shrine of Srinagar. The "Holy Relic Action Committee" was formed as a response to that incident and Abbas was named coordinator after the removal of Mirwaiz Farooq. The group dissolved after the return of the relic. Along with political leaders including Mohammad Farooq and Sofi Mohammad Akbar, he formed a political party named "Peoples Action Committee" in March 1964 to seek the right of self-determination for the people of Kashmir. Abbas opposed holding the state political convention in 1967 and 1968 and staged a walk out from the convention in protest against the policies of Sheikh Mohammad Abdullah. He was arrested several times during the Indo-Pakistani War of 1965 War under the National Security Act.

== Political activities ==
During the Indo-Pakistani War of 1971, Abbas again advocated for self-determination for the people of Kashmir. He was then arrested for inciting people against their own nation. After the Indira Gandhi-Sheikh Abdullah accord of February 1975, the Plebiscite Front ended and Sheikh Abdullah revived his National Conference. Ansari met Sheikh Abdullah in Kotla Lane, New Delhi and appealed to him to not let down cause of Jihad. He told the Sheikh that Kashmiris had "sacrificed" a lot from 1947 to 1974 for self-determination and their sacrifices could not be exchanged for the Chief Ministership. Sheikh Abdullah, however, signed the accord with Indira Gandhi and became the Chief Minister of the State. He opposed this accord and described it as unacceptable to the people of the state. Consequent upon the signing of the accord, Abbas brought all the people of identical ideology on a single political platform and declared creation of Peoples United Front. The Pakistani Prime Minister, Zulfiqar Ali Bhutto, called for a strike on 28 February to protest against the accord.

The period from 1975 to 1985 witnessed the continuous struggle of Abbas against New Delhi and democratic government in Kashmir. Abbas was opposition leader. During this period he always stood for the right of self-determination and launched a campaign against the liquor trade in Kashmir. The Government opposed these activities and Abbas was again detained and charged with mutiny and conspiracy against the Indian government. His trial occurred in a closed room in the central jail in Srinagar.

== Muslim United Front ==
In 1986 Abbas assembled Muslim scholars, politicians and parties from various factions on a single platform named Muslim United Front (MUF), on the fundamental issue of strengthening the Muslim community. It argued that Kashmir was occupied by fraud and brute force and its people had yet to exercise their right of self-determination. Abbas was selected conveyor of the Front. In 1987, the Front accepted the challenge of the chief Minister Farooq Abdullah to fight elections of state assembly to show the world that Kashmiris do not consider themselves to be a part of India. The election was rigged by the government. The Front's candidates were defeated by heavy margins and the National Conference-Congress Alliance formed a coalition government in the state. This was a turning point in the history of Kashmir and culminated in armed rebellion against Indian authority. The Front's supporters, particularly the youth who were harassed (and some were tortured) during and after elections, switched to militancy, which changed the situation dramatically. Abbas was arrested on 13 April 1990 under the "public safety act" and lodged in Srinagar's Badami Bagh cantonment interrogation centre. After a month of interrogation he was put in Jammu central jail from where he was exiled to Jodhpur in western India. From Jodhpur, Abbas was shifted to the Tihar Prisons, New Delhi and finally to the heavily guarded Mehrolli BSF camp, some 25 kilometers from New Delhi.

== Diplomatic struggle ==
In a January 1967 letter to U Thant, then the Secretary-General of the U.N., Abbas requested that the U.N. intervene over Kashmir. In 1974, Ansari called upon the leaders of India, Pakistan and world bodies to join hands in granting Kashmiris their birthright.

After his release in May 2000, Abbas undertook an overseas tour to present the freedom movement of Kashmir and highlight the atrocities reportedly being perpetrated on Kashmiris. In the United Kingdom, Iran, Saudi Arabia and Pakistan, he apprised the leadership and the public about the struggle. Abbas also gave a comprehensive presentation on Kashmir at the OIC meetings in Casablanca (Morocco) and Doha (Qatar) in December 1994 and November 2000 respectively. Later the government of India impounded his passport to prevent him from traveling abroad to champion the Kashmir cause, so he was not allowed to attend OIC's 10th and 11th summit in Malaysia and Senegal in 2003 and 2008 respectively and other conferences across the globe. Abbas was one of the senior Hurriyat leaders to meet the Pakistan president, General Pervez Musharraf and Iranian President Seyed Mohammad Khatami. He apprised them about the political situation in Kashmir and invited the Iranian government to mediate to resolve the issue. Resuming the process of interaction in the valley on his return, Ansari toured towns and villages to address public meetings.

== All Parties Hurriyat Conference ==
In 1992, Abbas was released along with his political companions like Abdul Gani Lone, Abdul Gani, Shabir Shah, Syed Ali Shah Geelani and Qazi Nisar Ahmed. After his release from jail, Abbas, along with his other colleagues, started organizing different political, religious, social and humanitarian organizations and played a role in the formation of All Parties Hurriyat Conference (APHC). APHC was founded in 1993 to unite various political parties of Jammu & Kashmir demanding the right of self-determination. Abbas represents Jammu & Kashmir Ittihadul Muslimeen in its seven-member Executive council, the chief policy making and executive body of A.P.H.C. The All Parties Hurriyat Conference kept up its campaign for a solution to the Kashmir issue. The leadership of the All Parties Hurriyat Conference was arrested once again in September 1999. Along with his colleagues, Abbas spent eight months in the prison.

On 12 July 2003, the APHC elected Abbas as its chairman at a meeting of Executive Committee members. Out of the seven constituents, representatives of six parties were present at the meeting. Abbas Ansari was the fourth chairman of the Hurriyat who replaced Abdul Ghani Bhat on the latter's completion of his two-year term. Ansari is the first Shiite head of the Hurriyat Conference.

Soon after taking over as chairman, he called for an immediate ceasefire between the security forces and the militants, saying that "the Kashmir issue is not a border dispute, but a humanitarian problem. It cannot be solved through gun, but only through negotiations."

On 21 May 2004 Abbas Ansari offered to resign his post in an effort to bring about the reunification of the coalition's factions and did so on July of that year. Organization's founder-chairman Mirwaiz Umar Farooq, was asked to work towards restoring the Hurriyat's original executive council and send invitations to all the pre-split executive council members.

== Hurriyat-New Delhi Talks ==
During his tenure as Chairman of APHC, Abbas initiated a dialogue process with Indian government on the basis that it should be unconditional, level-based and exclusively centered on Kashmir problem. An APHC delegation led by Abbas Ansari and composed of Mirwaiz Umar Farooq, Prof Abdul Ghani Bhat, Bilal Ghani Lone and Fazal-ul-Haq Qureshi negotiated with deputy prime minister of India L. K. Advani in New Delhi on 22 January 2004. The APHC delegation stressed that an honorable and durable solution should be found through dialogue. It was agreed that meeting was the first significant step in the dialogue process and a step-by-step approach would lead to the resolution of all outstanding issues relating to Jammu and Kashmir. The APHC delegation was committed to the enlargement of the dialogue process to cover all regions of Jammu and Kashmir and concerns of all communities. Pakistan President Pervez Musharraf termed these talks as "a very good beginning". The next round of APHC discussion with Indian government took place in the latter part of March.

== Srinagar-Muzaffarabad road ==
During his tenure as APHC Chairman, Abbas advocated the re-opening of the Srinagar-Rawalpindi road so that the people of both parts of Kashmir could meet their kin and help survivors of the 2005 earthquake. "The people on both sides of the Line of Control (LoC) have been craving to meet each other. When India and Pakistan can resume the New Delhi-Lahore bus service, there is no harm in reopening the Srinagar-Rawalpindi road", Abbas said in an interview. On 7 April 2005, the first passengers from either side of the Line of Control cross divided Kashmir as the first Srinagar Muzaffarabad Bus Service was launched. Hurriyat leaders including Abbas visited Pakistan and Muzaffarabad in June 2005 crossing the Line of Control by bus.

== Death ==
Ansari died in Srinagar on the morning of 25 October 2022, at the age of 86. Thousands of people attended his funeral.

== See also ==
- Hurriyat and Problems before Plebiscite
- Syed Ali Shah Geelani
- Kashmir conflict
- Tafazzul Husain Kashmiri
- Masroor Abbas Ansari
- Ghulam Rasool Noori
- Destruction of Kashmiri Shias
