= Masarat Alam Bhat =

Separatist leader & Chairperson of Hurriyat Conference

Chairman of All Parties Hurriyat Conference (Geelani faction)
- Interim
- Assumed office 7 September 2021
- Preceded by: Syed Ali Shah Geelani
- In office 7 September 2003 – 15 September 2003
- Preceded by: position established
- Succeeded by: Syed Ali Shah Geelani

Personal details
- Born: Masarat Alam Bhat; July 1971 (age 55) Srinagar, Jammu and Kashmir, India
- Party: Hurriyat (Geelani faction); Jammu Kashmir Muslim League
- Other political affiliations: Tehreek-e-Hurriyat; Jamaat-e-Islami Kashmir
- Education: University of Kashmir
- Occupation: Politician; Activist
- Website: www.thjk.org

Masarat Alam Bhat (born 1971) is a Kashmiri activist and a political separatist leader of Jammu and Kashmir. He is the chairman of the Jammu Kashmir Muslim League, and interim chairman of the Geelani faction of the All Parties Hurriyat Conference.

Bhat was appointed as the interim chairman of the Geelani faction of Hurriyat after the death of Syed Ali Shah Geelani. He played a significant role in the 2010 Kashmir Uprising rallies which broke out against the Machil fake encounter carried out by the Indian Army in Kashmir. Government has booked Masrat Alam in 27 criminal cases but in most of these he has either been exonerated or bailed out by the courts and was released after Mufti Mohammad Sayeed took over as the Chief Minister of Jammu and Kashmir on 1 March 2015.

Bhat was detained under the controversial Public Safety Act and was in March 2015 released which caused a major political controversy and dominated Indian Parliament Proceedings. Amid speculations over his release Masrat Aalam said that no deal was made between him and the Chief Minister Mufti Mohammad Sayeed, saying "I spent more than four years in prison and during all these years I challenged the grounds of my 'illegal' detention". He has been jailed for 17 years and has around 27 cases against him.

== Early life ==
Bhat was born in old-city Srinagar's Zaindar Mohalla in July 1971. Like many youths of his generation, he was drawn to the armed rebellion against Indian state that began in 1989. He was first arrested by the Border Security Force in October 1990 on charges of serving as a lieutenant to the then-prominent militant, Mushtaq Ahmad Bhat. He won a protracted legal battle in 1997 and began working at a cloth store owned by his grandfather, graduating the next year. From 1999, Bhat became increasingly active in the All Parties Hurriyat Conference(APHC) that cost him multiple stints in prison. He represented the Muslim League in APHC. Bhat found space under hardline Islamist leader Syed Ali Shah Geelani's wing after the Hurriyat Conference split in 2003.

== Detention ==
In 2010, he was on the run after the Indian government announced a reward for his arrest for issuing protest calendars. Subsequently he was arrested later that year and remained in custody until early 2015.

- He was arrested on 17 April 2015 by Kashmir police in Srinagar for raising Pakistan flag and shouting anti-India slogans. Syed Ali Shah Geelani has called for shutdown call for his arrest in Jammu and Kashmir on 18 April and some hurriyat supporters were doing protest against the arrest of Masarat Alam. In Budgam one protesting teenager boy who was claimed to be pelting stones was killed by CRPF firing which created tension in the Jammu and Kashmir. Again Public Safety Act has been invoked against him by Indian Government on 23 April. The valley saw sporadic clashes between Alam's supporters and the police. Protests were also held in some areas against his arrest, which has become the rallying point for separatists in Kashmir. The Jammu and Kashmir government has shifted Alam out of the valley to a jail in Jammu. Kashmiri separatists have called for shutdown on Saturday 25, 2015 in the valley against the detention of hardliner leader Masarat Alam under the Public Safety Act, a law that will allow the state to keep him in jail for two years without trial.
- On 1 September 2015, he was detained again in jail premises after authorities released him following the Jammu and Kashmir High Court's order for releasing him. After Jammu jail authorities freed Masarat Alam following the court orders, a police party however, rearrested him and took him away to some unknown destination. The Jammu and Kashmir High Court quashed the detention of hardline separatist leader Masrat Alam under the Public Safety Act (PSA). Justice Hasnain Masoodi announced in open court that he has quashed the detention order issued by state government under the PSA against Masrat Alam and the detailed order would follow. Many people believe that he could be a new leader in Jammu and Kashmir.

== Quotes ==
Following are the quotes by Masarat Alam on various occasions.

- "It is not only Indian administration (officials) who have a right to live in Jammu and Kashmir. We are sons of the soil and we have a right to live here. This is our land".
- "The state has been using force against us for decades but it will not deter us from fighting for our goal. For us there is no difference in who is in the government. They are all same."
- "I'm a stone thrower since childhood."

== Criticism and controversies ==
- Masarat Alam supported 2008 Mumbai Attacks mastermind Hafiz Saeed. Alam, who responded by raising a series of anti-India and pro-Pakistan slogans, including those favouring militants like Hizbul Mujahideen chief Syed Salahuddin (who is from Jammu and Kashmir and now in Pakistan administered), Azad Kashmir and LeT chief Hafiz Sayeed. "Hafiz Sayeed ka kya paigaam (What is Hafiz Sayeed’s message)," Alam shouted. "Kashmir banega Pakistan (Kashmir will become Pakistan).".
- After Kashmir flood disaster, Masarat created a huge controversy by saying that Kashmir valley does not need Indian forces to rescue people in case of natural disasters.

He said, "Our associates went to Badgam and Srinagar, we do not feel any kind of need. If disasters come, we do not need army and National Disaster Response Force (NDRF). We think these are occupational forces so how would they bring relief? Last time, they did specific relief operation and rescued their own people. People here know that."
This statement has been criticised by media for being anti-Kashmiri and it may bring Kashmiri people in danger.

- On 15 April 2015 he unfurled Pakistan flag in a rally in Srinagar and chanted pro-Pakistan slogans to greet Syed Ali Shah Geelani on his arrival in Srinagar from New Delhi which erupted huge controversy in Indian media. Later Jammu & Kashmir Police filed a case under Unlawful Activities (Prevention) Act against Geelani and Masarat Alam for raising anti-national slogans. On 17 April Masarat Alam was arrested by Srinagar police.

Jitendra Singh, Minister of State in Prime Minister's Office, said: "There's no compromise on any account, we are very clear on how such people have to be treated."
Minister of State for Home Affairs Kiren Rijiju said, "Alam's arrest sends a strong message to the fringe groups. We will not tolerate any kind of anti-India activities."
However, Lashkar-e-Taiba founder and mastermind of 2008 Mumbai Attacks Hafiz Saeed congratulated Masarat for his "anti-India act" and held a rally in support of Masarat in Lahore on 17 April 2015.

- Masarat has been criticized by media as "New poster boy of ISI in Kashmir valley". Indian authorities claim that Pakistan's game plan for Kashmir is to erupt 2010-style confrontations between the youth and the security forces by using leaders like Masarat Alam, so as to seek interest of the United States and European Union for mediation in Kashmir issue.

== See also ==
- 2014 Jammu and Kashmir Legislative Assembly election
