= Sheikh Abdul Aziz =

Kashmiri politician (1952–2008)

- شیخ عبدل عزیز
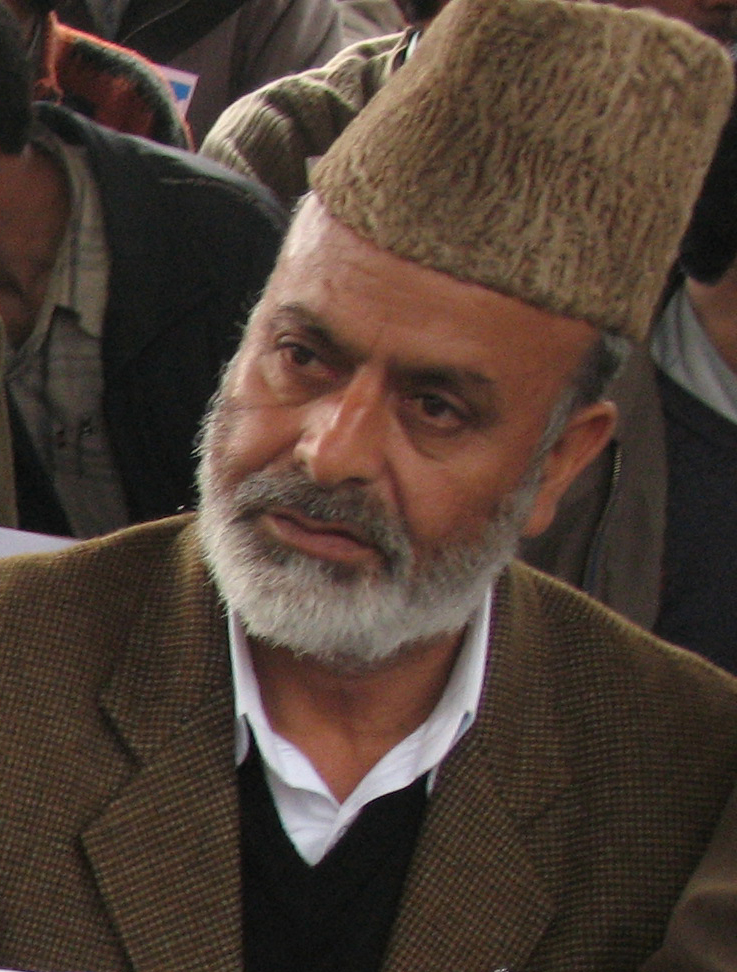
- Aziz in 2008
- Born: 1952; Pampore, Jammu and Kashmir, India
- Died: 11 August 2008 (aged 55–56)
- Occupation: Kashmiri separatist politician
- Known for: Chairman of the Jammu Kashmir People league ; Executive member of the All Parties Hurriyat Conference
- Office: Chairman, Jammu Kashmir Peoples League
- Predecessor: S Hamid Wani
- Successor: Mukhtar Ahmed Waza

Sheikh Abdul Aziz (1952 – 11 August 2008) was chairman of the Jammu Kashmir Peoples League and a prominent member of the All Parties Hurriyat Conference, an alliance of Kashmiri separatist groups active in Jammu and Kashmir. He was known for his advocacy of the right to self-determination of Kashmir and believed that an independent plebiscite under UN supervision could bring peace in South-Asia.

Aziz was killed by the Indian Paramilitary Forces on 11 August 2008 while leading a demonstration against the alleged 'economic blockade' of the Kashmir Valley predominantly having Muslim population being enforced by native Kashmiri hardliner groups during the Amarnath land transfer row.

Aziz was a "pro-freedom" politician. He had been jailed on several occasions for demanding independence from both Kashmir. He is the third prominent separatist leader to have been killed after the eruption of 1989 armed struggle against Indian government in Jammu and Kashmir. He was succeeded by Mukhtar Ahmed Waza

== Early life ==
Sheikh Abdul Aziz was born in 1952 in Namblabal, district Pampore close to the capital city Srinagar. He was of Arab ancestry whose ancestors had migrated from outside to Kashmir. He received basic education from Government School Pampore and then passed Matriculation from Government High School Pampore. Soon after passing his Matriculation examination, Aziz joined the agriculture business of his father Sheikh Abdul Salam, including growing high yield saffron, for which his hometown is famous throughout the Kashmir Valley.

== Death ==
On 11 August 2008 the "Muzaffarabad chalo" call was given by the Hurriyat Conference and some other organisations against the 'economical blockade' of Kashmir valley. Processions were taken out from various areas across the valley. Aziz and Shabbir Shah were leading the march from Sopore towards the de facto border with Pakistan, when their rally was stopped by a force of police and army at Chala, 25 km away from the border town of Uri, to disperse the march. Aziz along with many others were injured. All the critically injured were taken to Srinagar's SMHS hospital, where Aziz died. He was buried in "Martyr's Graveyard" in Eidgah, Srinagar on 12 August 2008.

== See also ==
- Mukhtar Ahmed Waza
- Ayub Thakur
- Hurriyat and Problems before Plebiscite
- 2014 Jammu and Kashmir Legislative Assembly election
- Kashmir Dispute
- Syed Ali Shah Geelani
- United Nations Security Council Resolution 47
