= Ghulam Qadir Wani =

Kashmiri scholar and diplomat

Personal details
- Born: 11 March 1953 Arin, Bandipore, Jammu and Kashmir
- Died: 4 November 1998 (aged 45) Arin, Bandipore, Jammu and Kashmir
- Other political affiliations: Jamaat-e-Islami, Al Barq, Muslim United Front (MUF), Student Islamic Organisation (SIO), Islamic Students League (ISL), Muslim Mutahida Mahaz (MMM), Jammu and Kashmir Liberation Front (JKLF)
- Education: Ph.D. in Iqbalism from Jawaharlal Nehru University
- Occupation: Diplomat, Scholar, Editor

Ghulam Qadir Wani (11 March 1953 – 4 November 1998) was a Kashmiri scholar, diplomat and co-founder of Muslim United Front, He was also described as "the top Jamaat-e-Islami ideologue".

== Early life ==
Wani was born in a middle-class family in Arin in north Kashmir's township of Bandipore. He was a product of Jamaat-e-Islami. As early as 8th grade he wrote an article in Srinagar Times about feudalism brought him to the attention of the group. He pursued a master's degree in English from Kashmir University and later completed a doctorate on Iqbalism from Jawahar Lal Nehru University, Delhi.

Wani spent six months in 1973 in the Bagh-e-Mehtab Interrogation Centre, working against the Indira Shiekh Accord that was underway through Beg Parthasthi dialogue. In 1982 Shiekh Abdullah offered him a berth in the state Cabinet as Education minister, but he declined.

== Career ==
Wani fought on both the political and military fronts. He had also joined Al Barq. During his political career he held positions in various organisations of the resistance front.

He edited Jamaat's journal for several years after he completing his doctorate. He remained editor in chief of Daily Uqaab. On 23 March 1986 (Pak Day) he wrote an article that received so much viewership that Uqaab was sold in black at 59 Rs per copy.

He was closely associated with Muslim United Front (MUF) and was among the pioneers of Student Islamic Organisation (SIO) and acted in the capacity of district president. He was the founder patron of Islamic Students League (ISL) and General Secretary of Muslim Mutahida Mahaz (MMM) that he founded with Qazi Nisar who opposed Farooq Abdullah in 1986 state Assembly elections.

In 1988 he joined Jklf as its publicity Secretary. He wrote the group's constitution. Before that the commander in chief of Jklf Ammanullah Khan group in Kashmir Bashart Raza, Nisar Telbali and dozens of colleagues were attached to him. After the arrest of Yaseen Malik he rejoined ISL and has led ISL since 1992 in AJK.

In 1995 visited Bradford, UK for a meeting using a Pakistani passport. Later that year he returned home, he was said to have displayed disillusionment with many aspects of the movement and decided to stay away from politics.

== Death ==
On the evening of 4 November 1998 Ikhwan pro-India militia-affiliated gunmen barged into his house in Arin Bandipora and opened fire at close range. Wani's niece was killed instantly, while the leader succumbed to his injuries on the way to the hospital. His daughter and a servant were injured in the incident.
