= Jammu and Kashmir Public Safety Act, 1978 =

Preventive detention law in the Indian state of Jammu and Kashmir

Public Safety Act, 1978

Jammu and Kashmir Legislature
- Long title: an Act whereas it is necessary in the interest of the security of the State and public order to make law providing for the measures hereinafter appearing.
- Citation: Act No. VI of 1978
- Territorial extent: Jammu and Kashmir
- Enacted by: Governor of Jammu and Kashmir
- Enacted: 8 April 1978
- Status: In force

The Jammu and Kashmir Public Safety Act, 1978 (PSA) is a preventive detention law under which a person is taken into custody to prevent them from acting harmfully against "the security of the state or the maintenance of the public order" in the Indian state of Jammu and Kashmir (now a union territory). Whereas PSA applies only to Jammu and Kashmir, it is very similar to the National Security Act that is used by the central and other state governments of India for preventive detention.

It was introduced by the then-Chief Minister, Sheikh Abdullah, in 1978 to ostensibly stop the smuggling of timber. However, the political motives behind the law became clearer when Sheikh Abdullah used it for the first time against political rivals. Since its usage in the late 1970s, it is still being used today for "the security of the state". Following the bifurcation of Jammu and Kashmir in 2019, PSA was one of the state laws which was retained under the Jammu and Kashmir Reorganisation Act of 2019.

In 2015, the government made public the figure of 16,329 persons having been detained under the act since 1988, nearly all from Kashmir. National Crime Records Bureau records only 16 women detentions in the period 1995–2008. In February 2020, a petition was filed in the Supreme Court of India by Bhim Singh of the Jammu and Kashmir National Panthers Party terming PSA "as dead and ultra vires".

== Background and history ==
=== Preventive detention in India ===
The Preventive Detention Act of 1950 came into force within a month after the Constitution of India came into force. While enacted for only one year, it was renewed year after year until 31 December 1969. The next major preventive detention legislation came in the form of the Maintenance of Internal Security Act of 1971.

Currently the provision for preventive detention in India exists under the Code of Criminal Procedure, which draws its roots from laws in British India. The Jammu and Kashmir Public Safety Act of 1978 is only one of the acts in India that cater to prevention detention at a state level. While some states have their own preventive detention acts, there are four central acts covering preventive detention at a national level: the National Security Act (NSA) of 1980, the Conservation of Foreign Exchange and Prevention of Smuggling Activities Act (COFEPOSA) of 1974, the Prevention of Black Marketing & Maintenance of Supplies of Essential Commodities Act of 1980, and the Prevention of Illicit Traffic in Narcotic Drugs and Psychotropic Substances Act, 1988. The time duration of detention permitted under these acts varies from 24 hours to over a year.

=== Legal history of PSA ===
The Public Safety Act has its roots in the Defence of India Act of 1915, passed during British rule, and later in the 1946 Public Security Act which was used by the British to repress the Quit Kashmir Movement. This was replaced in 1954 with a temporary Preventive Detention Act by the Jammu and Kashmir government, which was again ratified in 1958 followed by numerous amendments leading to the Jammu and Kashmir Public Safety Ordinance in 1977. This was then amended into the 1978 Public Safety Act enacted by Sheikh Abdullah. The 1978 PSA was amended in 1987, 1990, 2012, and as recently as August 2018 to allow individuals to be detained outside the state.

=== Legal provisions ===
The Public Safety Act 1978 consists of five chapters and 24 sections. The five chapters cover:

CHAPTER I Preliminary
CHAPTER II Access to certain premises and areas
CHAPTER III Maintenance of communal and regional harmony
CHAPTER IV Power to make orders detaining certain persons
CHAPTER V Miscellaneous

Chapter II of the act allows the state to limit access to certain places, designating them as "prohibited places" and "protected areas". Violators can be fined and punished. Chapter III allows the government to forbid the circulation of harmful documents.

Chapter IV of the act details "detention of certain persons" including those who qualify as a foreigner or "a person residing in the area of the State under the occupation of Pakistan" to prevent them "from acting in any manner prejudicial to... the security of the state or the maintenance of public order" or those involved in smuggling or abetting the smuggling of timber or liquor.

Notably there is a provision, Grounds of detention severable, (10.A.a) that goes on to state that the:

order shall not be deemed to be invalid or inoperative merely because one or some of the grounds is or are–– (a) vague, (ii) non-existent, (iii) not relevant, (iv) not connected or not proximately connected with such person, or (v) invalid for any other reasons whatsoever...

In the act the meaning of timber is elaborated: "'Timber' means timber of Fir, Kail, Chir or Deodar tree whether in logs or cut up in pieces but does not include firewood".

== Timber smuggling ==
Timber smuggling is a major threat in Jammu and Kashmir. By some estimates, this trade is worth tens of millions pounds a year. The smuggling industry involves bureaucrats, families of ministers, and traders. In 2006, the Forestry Minister of the state said there are isolated cases in the forestry department, police, and army which have a connection with smugglers. In 2016, more than 700 people were booked for timber smuggling in the state, including 75 forestry officials. Out of these, eight persons were detained under the Public Safety Act (PSA) for repeated forestry offences. In 2019, fifteen timber smugglers were arrested during nocturnal raids.

Ostensibly, to help curb timber smugglers the Jammu and Kashmir Public Safety Act was passed in 1978.

Forest cover in Jammu and Kashmir: Kashmir Region has 40.17%, Jammu Region has 59.64%

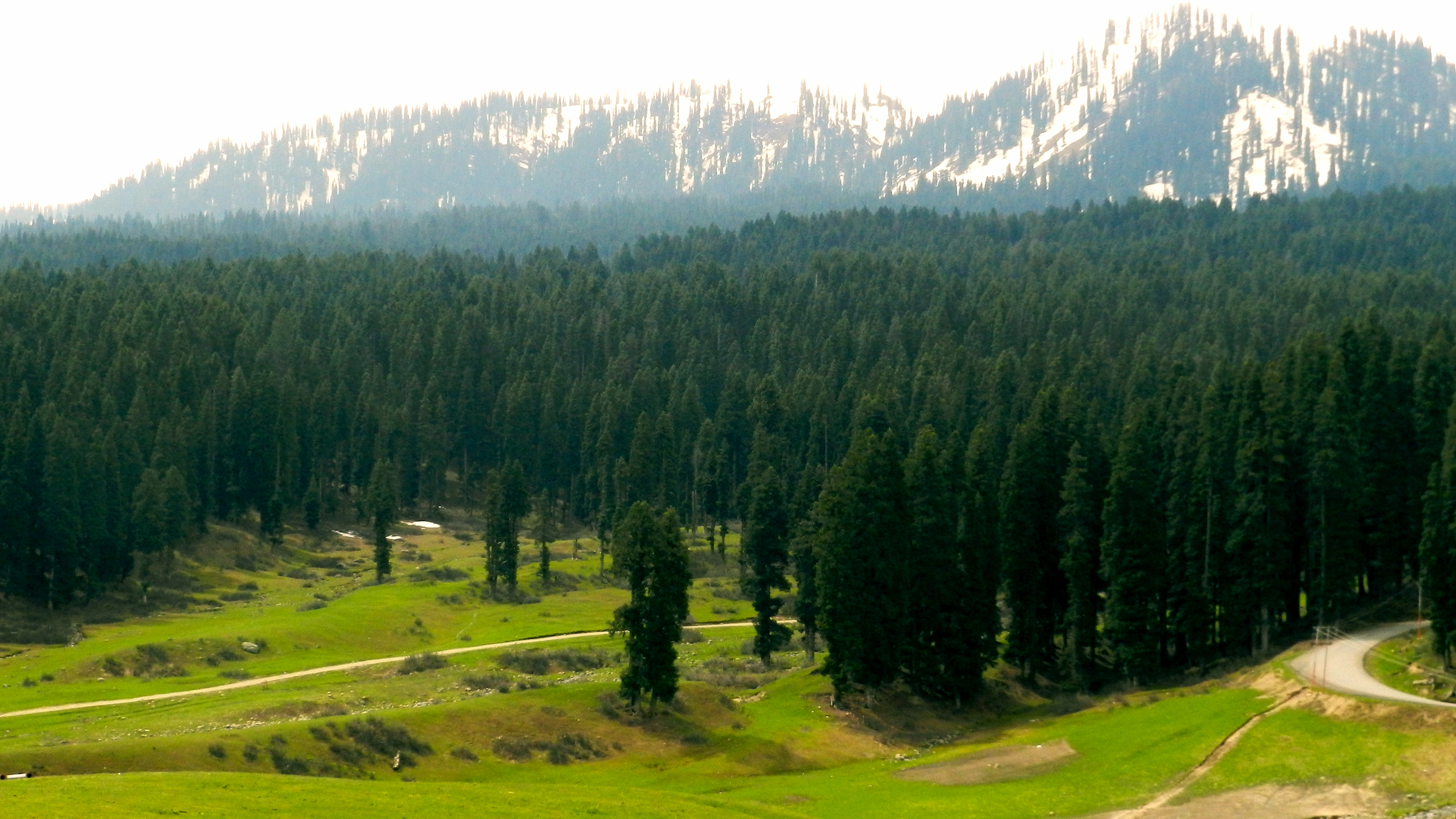

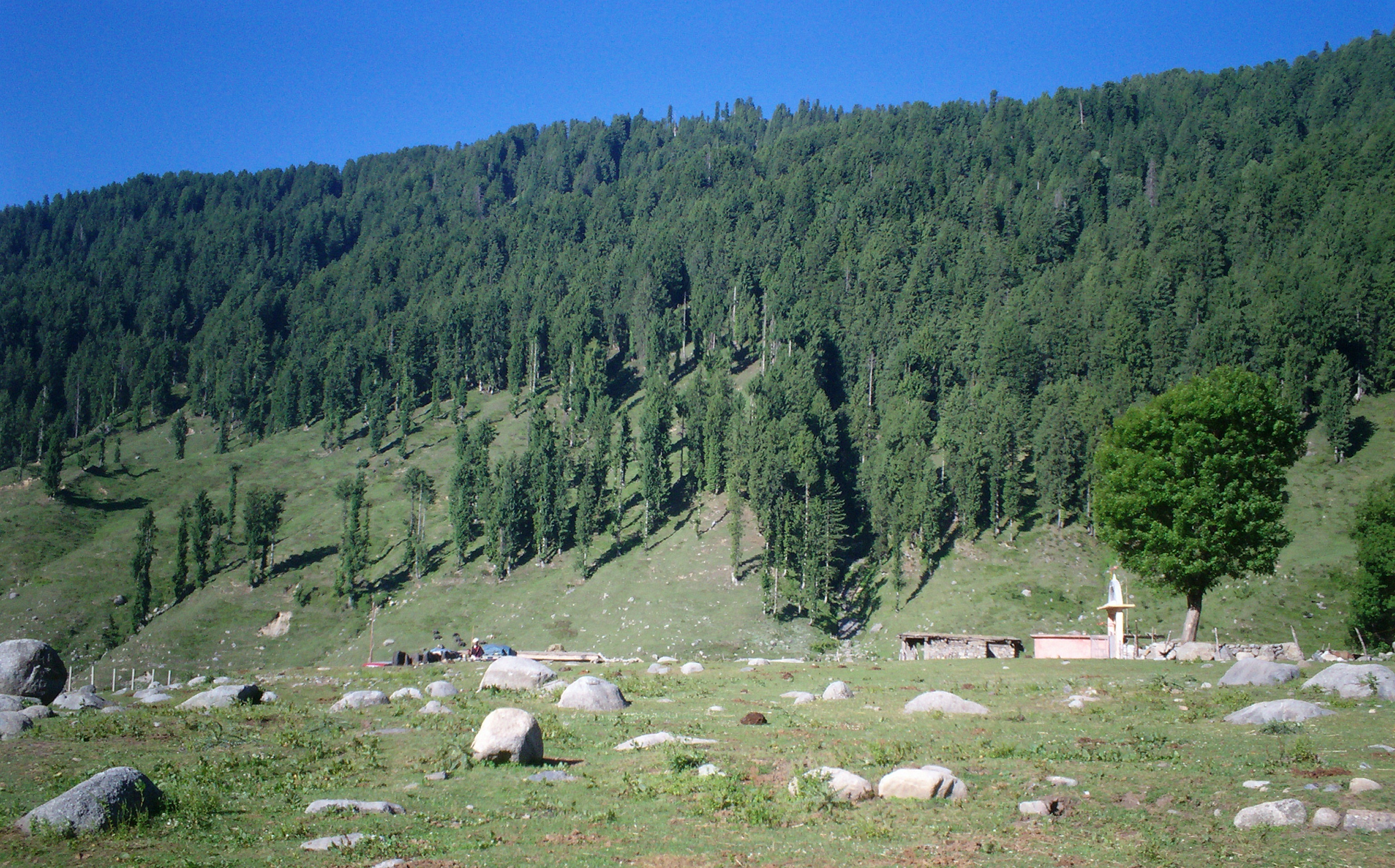

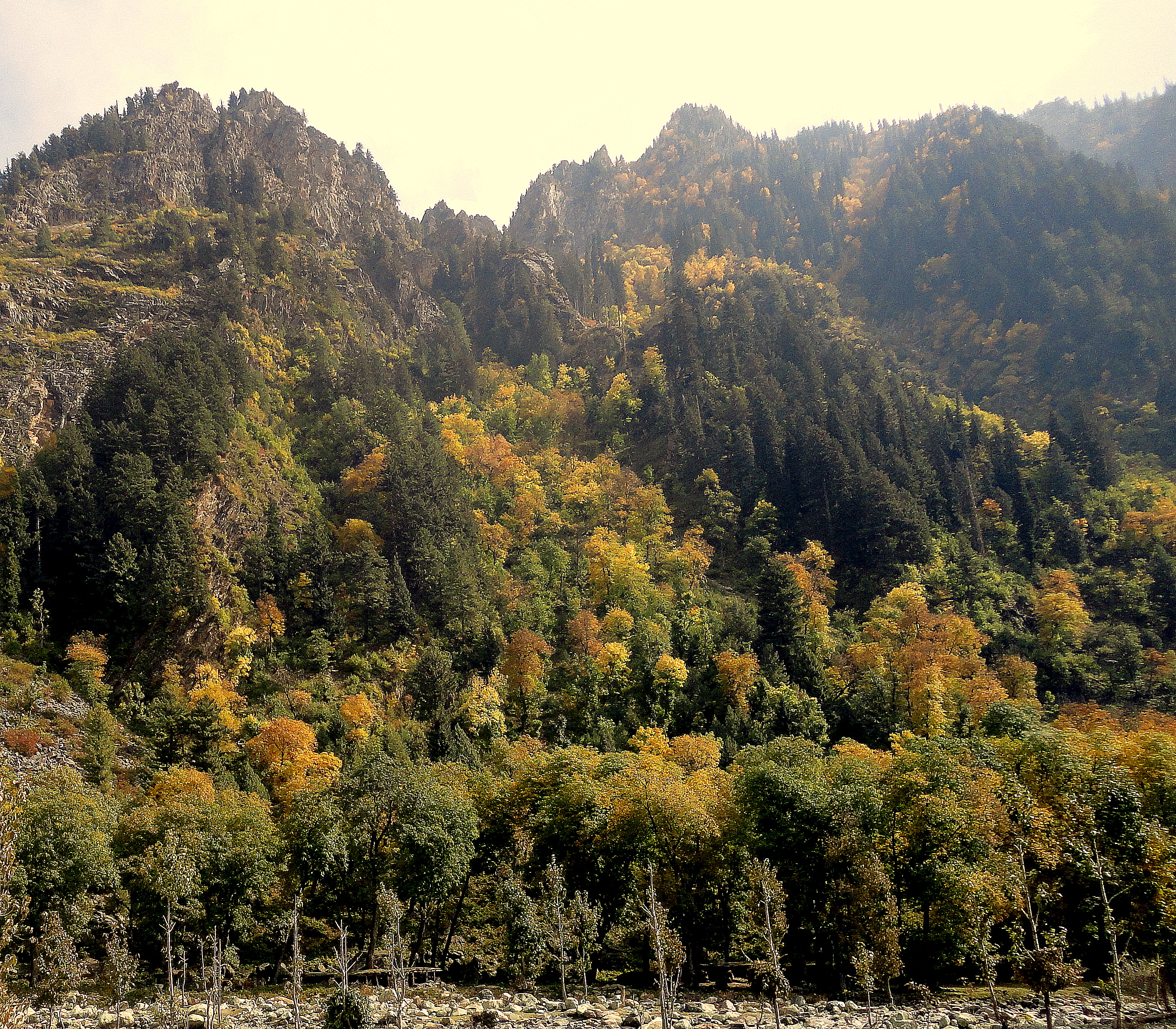

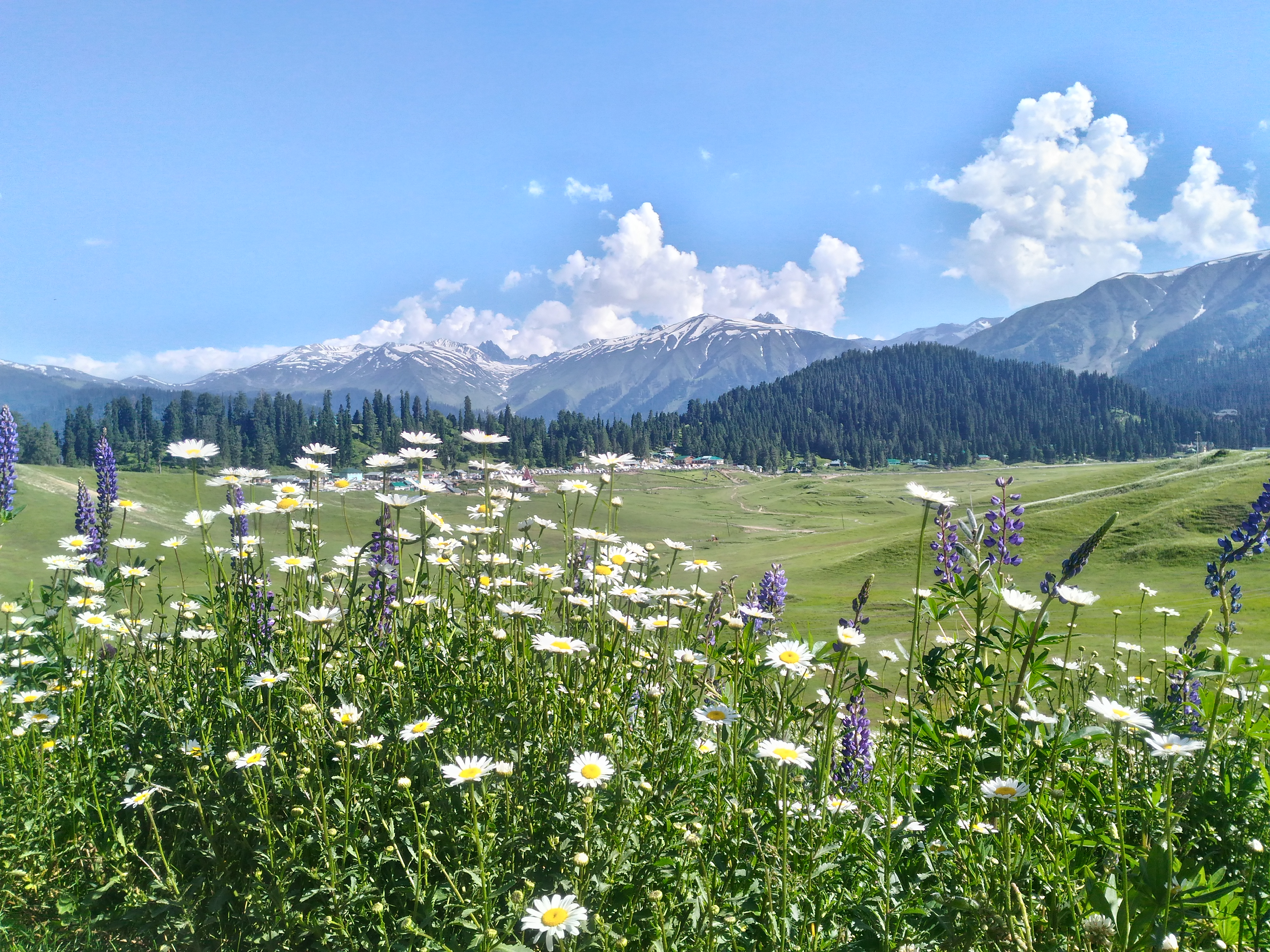

== Implementation ==
While the PSA was initially portrayed as an act to combat timber smuggling in the state, the act has been used to quell dissent and "keep people out of circulation". According to a Human Rights Watch report in 1990: "the act establishes a legal procedure which, while technically consistent with international standards, in practice falls short of international due process and fair trial standards". The report gives an example of the grounds on which the PSA was applied on a person in 1987:

Besides being a member of JEI (Jamaat-e-Islami) an organisation which is anti-national in character, [you] have always been challenging the accession of the State with the Union of India... You and your party men propagate and advocate among the people of the State that they have yet to decide their future which can only be done through plebiscite...

— District Magistrate, Baramulla to Abdul Rashid Hajam

During PSA detention, the detainee can be lodged in any suitable prison or subsidiary jail (such as a house) in India without a warrant, trial, or court hearing for a maximum of one or two years. (Note: In other states in India the National Security Act applied, which has a maximum detention period of one year.) The law has been criticized for allowing arbitrary detentions and immunity from prosecution.

Numerous people have been detained under the PSA in the recent past, including three former Chief Ministers of Jammu and Kashmir—namely Farooq Abdullah, Omar Abdullah (Farooq and Omar are the son and grandson respectively of Sheikh Abdullah), and Mehbooba Mufti. Notably, Omar Abdullah, who was detained under the act, refused to revoke the act during his tenure as Chief Minister, saying that there are enough inbuilt safeguards to prevent the act's misuse. Others include Masarat Alam, Yasin Malik, Asiya Andrabi and Shah Faesal. Shah Faesal was booked under PSA in 2019 and 2020 for a number of reasons, including "soft separatism". The dossier reads:

The subject advocates the idea of soft separatism through his articles, tweets and social media posts, which on several occasions have attracted response, amounting to a potential threat to public order.

In February 2020, a petition was filed in the Supreme Court of India by Bhim Singh of Jammu and Kashmir National Panthers Party terming PSA "as dead and ultra vires."

=== Statistics ===
In 2015 the government made public the figure of 16,329 persons having been detained under the act since 1988, nearly all from Kashmir. National Crime Records Bureau records only 16 women detentions in the period 1995–2008. In 2010, an Amnesty International report estimated there had been 10,000 to 20,000 arrests under the act since its inception.

In 2016, around 600 people were detained under PSA orders. The courts have annulled hundreds of detention orders over the years. Masarat Alam's was one of the detention orders quashed in December 2016. Data from an RTI revealed that between April 2016 and December 2017, 99.40% or 998 cases were found to be suitable for detention by the advisory board; however, in the same time period, the Jammu and Kashmir High Court annulled the detention orders in 81% of the admitted 941 cases.

Following the Jammu and Kashmir Reorganisation Act of 2019, numerous people were detained under PSA and CrPC; and as of 11 March 2020, 396 persons were still detained under PSA.

== Procedure and functioning ==
Public Safety Act allows administrative detention of:

- 3 months - 1 year, where "any person is acting in any manner prejudicial to the maintenance of public order".
- 6 months - 2 years, in the "case of persons acting in any manner prejudicial to the security of the State".
- 12 months, in the case of the persons indulging in smuggling of timber.

=== Issuing order ===
Under Section 8 of the act, a Divisional Commissioner or a District Magistrate, both executive authorities, may issue a detention order to prevent anyone from acting in a manner prejudicial to the "security of the State or the maintenance of the public order".

=== Informing grounds of detention ===
Under Section 13 of the act, the detaining authority is required to inform the person detained, the grounds of detention within 10 days of detention in a language they understand. However sub-section 2, allows the authority to hold back any information that it considers "against the public interest to disclose".

At the same time, the authority is required to inform the State Government about the order and get it approved in 12 days, for the order to remain in force.

=== Reviewing the order ===
All detention orders, along with the grounds of the orders and representations (if any) must be placed before a non-judicial advisory board within 4 weeks of the detention.

The advisory board is then required to review the detention order, representation and any information necessary and submit its report to the State Government within 8 weeks of the detention. However, the person detained is not entitled to any legal counsel, since PSA explicitly bars detainees from being represented by legal counsel before the advisory board.

=== Compensation ===
Further, Section 22 of the act, provides immunity to the officials involved, providing a complete bar on legal proceedings against any officials for anything done or intended to be done in good faith in pursuance of the provisions of this Act.

== Issues ==
The Act is widely criticized for being undemocratic and against the principles of a free society. Nowadays, the people who had once passed this act are suffering from the same. Many sections of the act violate major international treaties to which India is a signatory, with the likes of ICCPR.

=== Critical sections of the Act that violate international human rights ===
==== Section 8 ====
Under international human rights law, restrictions on liberty must obey the principle of legality: they must be adequately accessible and precise so that people can regulate their conduct according to it.

However, the PSA does not define "security of the state", and provides a vague and over-broad understanding of "public order". The operative provisions of the act are too broad and vague that they end up granting the authorities sweeping powers, at the same time seriously diminishing any real possibility for persons detained to contest the legality of the detention order.

==== Section 13 ====
Section 13 of the act, allows the authority to not communicate grounds of detention for up to 5 days, which can be extended to 10 days of detention. Article 9(2) of the ICCPR provides that anyone arrested has a right to be immediately informed about the grounds of the arrest, which also applies to preventive and administrative detentions.

And at the same time, the Sub-Section 2, allows the authorities to withhold any information that it considers "to be against public interest" to disclose, which has been abused many times by the authorities to withhold significant information from the person detained. Such provisions of non-disclosure are in violation of Article 9(2) of the ICCPR.

==== Section 15 ====
Under Article 9(4) of the ICCPR, every person deprived of their liberty, whether arrested or detained has a right to a judicial review, however, PSA makes no such provisions and instead an advisory board, a non-judicial body appointed by the government on the recommendations of a three-person committee comprising senior state bureaucrats reviews all the orders.

==== Section 16 ====
Detained persons have the right to communicate with and be represented by a counsel of their choice, however, Section 16 of the Public Safety Act, states that any person against whom a detention order has been made is not entitled to legal counsel with respect to the advisory board and its proceedings.

Section 16 not only disregards the "right to communicate with and be represented by counsel of choosing in the determination of criminal charges" guaranteed by Articles 14(3)(b) and (d) of the ICCPR but also undermines the right to challenge the legality of detention set out in Article 9(4).

==== Section 22 ====
Everyone has a right to a remedy under international human rights law and standards.

However, Section 22 of the Public Safety Act, provides a complete bar on criminal, civil or "any other legal proceedings...against any person for anything done or intended to be done in good faith in pursuance of the provisions of this Act", thus enabling impunity by protecting officials even in situations where PSA is abused.

=== Inconsistency of data ===
The data regarding the number of humans detained under PSA throughout the years has been quite inconsistent, with figures widely conflicting with each other. For example, in January 2018, the J&K government said only 525 persons were detained under PSA in 2016, which was almost half the number quoted by media reports in 2019. The government also said, 201 persons were booked in 2017, when the official data says that more than double, 410 were booked under PSA.

This can be further seen in the 2011 report by Amnesty International,

Number of persons held under administrative detention in J&K 1990-2008

(Statistics from National Crime Records Bureau and Greater Kashmir Newspaper.)

Year	NCRB	Greater Kashmir
1990	NA	942
1991	NA	1070
1992	NA	976
1993	NA	1112
1994	NA	2118
1995	799	1819
1996	1022	1560
1997	725	414
1998	303	460
1999	269	441
2000	497	503
2001	416	318
2002	444	504
2003	397	401
2004	451	510
2005	377	402
2006	369	920
2007	275	NA
2008	266	NA

While Amnesty does not consider either of the sources entirely reliable, it stresses on the fact that government stats are often inconsistent, for example, it says for 1997, the NCRB notes 725 detainees, but in a reply to a petition before NHRC, the Central Government counsel submitted on record that as of December 1997, 1016 persons were held under preventive detention in J&K.

=== Role of Detaining Authorities ===
An order of administrative detention under the PSA can be passed by the District Magistrates and Divisional Commissioners, thus making it a purely executive exercise of power.

The Supreme Court of India has stated: "Prevention detention is, by nature, repugnant to democratic ideas and an anathema to the rule of law… Preventive detention is often described as a "jurisdiction of suspicion". The detaining authority passes the order of detention on subjective satisfaction... To prevent misuse of this potentially dangerous power the law of preventive detention has to be strictly construed and meticulous compliance with the procedural safeguards, however technical, is, in our opinion, mandatory and vital."

==== Lack of SOPs ====
An RTI application to the J&K Home Department filed by members of the J&K RTI Movement revealed that the State Government of J&K has not made any Rules or Standard Operating Procedures (SOPs) under PSA, during the four decades of its existence. Every year the detaining authorities have been issuing detention orders without any SOPs to guide them except the reports and dossiers prepared by the J&K Police.

==== Failure to Scrutinize Evidence ====
In an interview with Amnesty International, a former District Magistrate said that the Magistrates do not have dedicated assistance available, which could verify and seriously examine the police version, thus the District Magistrate as to necessarily rely on the reports filed by the police. Thus reducing their role to mere rubber stamps.

Amnesty India observed a common flaw in the detention orders where the detaining authorities reproduced word-for-word the dossier given by the police which contained the allegations against the person detained.
Many such detention orders have been quashed by the High Court, for example in May 2017, a detention was quashed by the High Court, stating among other reasons: "Perusal of grounds of detention would show that it is a verbatim copy of Dossier of Senior Superintendent of Police submitted by him to the Concerned Magistrate."

=== Role of Advisory Boards ===
Since the PSA does not make any provision for judicial review or any appeal process to detainees, under Section 14 of the PSA, a non- judicial body, Advisory Board is set up to review detention orders and determine whether there is sufficient cause for detention. The advisory board examines the case only in the initial stages of the detention. There is no provision in the PSA to appeal against the decision of the advisory board.

==== Appointment ====
Advisory Board consists of two members and a chairperson, which are appointed by the government. Prior to the Jammu & Kashmir (Preventive Detention Laws) Ordinance 2018, the members of the advisory board were appointed by the Government in consultation with the Chief Justice of the High Court.

The ordinance removes the mandatory requirement of consultation with the Chief Justice of the J&K High Court. Now the members – provided they were not sitting judges – would be appointed by the government on the recommendations of a 3-person committee made up of senior state bureaucrats. Thus enhancing the role that the executive play and reducing the independence of the advisory board.

==== Functioning ====
The advisory board is required to review the grounds of detention and the representation, if any, by the person detained. Anyone detained under PSA is not entitled to legal counsel. The board is known for almost always upholding the detention orders passed by executive officials. For example, an RTI application filed by two students of the Department of Law, University of Kashmir revealed that the advisory board was referred 1004 detention orders by the State Government between April 2016 and mid-December and it found sufficient cause to uphold the detention order in 99.40% cases.

The J&K High Court quashed more than 81% of the detention orders that the Board upheld earlier in the same period. The RTI also revealed that the advisory board spent more than 75% of its total expenditure in 2016–17 to uphold detention orders which were quashed later on by the court. It was observed by Amnesty International was informed that in many cases, detainees refuse to file representations before the advisory board, as they see no hope of a proper hearing.

=== Criticism from Judiciary and Civil Societies ===
During a preventive detention case under PSA in 1982, the Supreme Court of India said: "danger looms large that the normal criminal trials and criminal courts set up for administering justice will be substituted by detention laws often described as lawless law".

Indian lawyer and constitutional expert A. G. Noorani said PSA is "patently, manifestly and demonstrably unconstitutional", adding that it is a way of bypassing "civilized jurisprudence" and "a devious way to imprison political opponents". "The upper limit on the period of detention is frequently violated" notes historian Mridu Rai. Mohmad Aabid Bhat writes in Insight Turkey that the excuse of "public order" and "security" is being used to justify inhumane laws such as PSA.

A report by Observer Research Foundation titled "Life in Kashmir after Article 370" dated 28 January 2020 recommended the immediate repeal of the PSA.

== Bibliography ==
- Bhat, Mohmad Aabid (2019), "Preventive Detention in Counter-insurgencies: The Case of Kashmir", Insight Turkey 2019/04, SET Vakfı İktisadi İşletmesi
- Bose, Sumantra (2003), Kashmir: Roots of Conflict, Paths to Peace, Harvard University Press, ISBN 0-674-01173-2
- Duschinski, Haley; Ghosh, Shrimoyee Nandini (2017). "Constituting the occupation: preventive detention and permanent emergency in Kashmir". The Journal of Legal Pluralism and Unofficial Law. 49 (3): 314–337. doi:10.1080/07329113.2017.1347850. ISSN 0732-9113. S2CID 148881842.
- Cottrell, Jill (2013), "Kashmir: The vanishing autonomy", in Yash Ghai; Sophia Woodman (eds.), Practising Self-Government: A Comparative Study of Autonomous Regions, Cambridge University Press, pp. 163–199, doi:10.1017/CBO9781139088206.006, ISBN 978-1-107-29235-2
- Pandit, Huzaifa (2019). "Schools of resistance – a brief history of student activism in Kashmir". Postcolonial Studies. 22 (1): 95–116. doi:10.1080/13688790.2019.1568171. ISSN 1368-8790. S2CID 150693237.
- Rai, Mridu (2018), "Kashmir: From Princely State to Insurgency", Oxford Research Encyclopedia of Asian History, Oxford University Press, doi:10.1093/acrefore/9780190277727.013.184, ISBN 9780190277727
