= Jammu and Kashmir Ittihadul Muslimeen =

Islamic organisation in Jammu and Kashmir

Jammu & Kashmir Ittihadul Muslimeen جموں و کشمیر اتحاد المسلمین
- Logo of the Jammu & Kashmir Ittihadul Muslimeen
- Abbreviation: JKIM
- Leader: Masroor Abbas Ansari
- President: Masroor Abbas Ansari
- Chairperson: Masroor Abbas Ansari
- General Secretary: Syed Muzaffar Razvi
- Founder: Mohammad Abbas Ansari
- Founded: 27 March 1962 (64 years ago)
- Banned: 11 March 2025
- Headquarters: Govt. Medical College Road Srinagar, Jammu and Kashmir, India
- Ideology: Pan-Islamism; Kashmiri separatism Self-determination; Moderate Islamism; Shi'a–Sunni unity
- Political position: Big tent
- Religion: Islam
- Regional affiliation: All Parties Hurriyat Conference
- Colours: Green

Website
- ittihadul.org

Jammu & Kashmir Ittihadul Muslimeen (Urdu: جموں و کشمیر اتحاد المسلمین) (abbr. JKIM) is a Kashmiri Shiite Muslim political party which aims for Shi'a–Sunni unity in Kashmir and the political rights to people of Jammu and Kashmir through peaceful struggle. It was founded by Mohammad Abbas Ansari and his followers in 1962 at Srinagar, Kashmir.

== History ==
Jammu & Kashmir Ittihadul Muslimeen was founded by a group of Shiite Muslim clergy and scholars headed by Mohammad Abbas Ansari on 27 March 1962, in Srinagar, Jammu and Kashmir, who was the ex-chairman of the All Parties Hurriyat Conference. The founder of JKIM & Islamic Unity leader Maulana Mohammad Abbas Ansari first founded Anjumani Safina (Safina Association) in May 1961. The association was confined to a limited orbit, therefore in view of the vast interests of the Nation its extent was necessary. It was very important to take revolutionary steps to expose its vast ideologies publicly. In his quest for forging unity among the people of the valley particularly Muslim, Maulana Abbas Ansari and the members of the Anjumani Safina made an all-embracing political party "Jammu & Kashmir Ittihadul-Muslimeen" (JKIM) (Unity of Muslims) in 1962 at its historic Chattabal (Srinagar) General Session of the Organization. Since Ansari's death in 2022, it has been headed by his son, Masroor Abbas Ansari.

== 8th Moharram Procession ==
A grand Processions on 8th of the Islamic month of Muharram in Kashmir mark the Day for commemorating the death of Husayn ibn Ali in the Battle of Karbala. All the major mourning processions have been banned by the Government of Jammu and Kashmir since the 1990s when there was a rise in insurgency in the state. Smaller processions are permitted in some predominantly Shia parts of the state, including in the districts of Baramulla, Budgam, Leh and Kargil. In the state capital of Srinagar, processions are not allowed along the traditional route that begins at Guru Bazar, passes through M A Road and culminated at Dalgate on 8th Moharram and the second one from Abi Guzar, passes through Maisuma, and ends at Zadibal on Ashura. JKIM never accepted this ban calling it unjust and unconstitutional and invited mourners to join the 8th procession. there were sometimes clashes between the mourners and the police.

The government privately cites fear of militant strikes as a reason for the restrictions. Shia leaders in the state, such as Mohammad Abbas Ansari, complained that the restrictions are discriminatory and impinge on their freedom of religion.

In 2023, the Muharram 8th procession was allowed after 34 years of hiatus.

== Decision of MHA ==
The Ministry of Home Affairs (MHA) on 11 March 2025 declared Jammu & Kashmir Ittihadul Muslimeen as an unlawful association and banned it with immediate effect for a period of next five years.

"Jammu & Kashmir Ittihadul Muslimeen and Awami Action Committee have been declared unlawful associations under UAPA. These organisations were found inciting people to cause law and order situations, posing a threat to the unity and integrity of Bharat," Union Home Minister Amit Shah posted on X.

JKIM chairman Maulana Masroor Abbas Ansari strongly condemned the ban calling it unjustified & unfair ban and unconstitutional. He said that his organization has advocated for the aspirations & rights of the people of J&K through completely peaceful, non-violent & democratic means & seeks a permanent & lasting solution to the problems of people. He added that religious sentiments of Millions of people are associated with JKIM and this organization has always been a pioneer in social services & its connection with the people is strong and invincible, so this voice cannot be silenced. He urged the MHA to review this decision and revoke the ban because coercion and restrictions do not solve problems but create further complications. “If they don’t, we will pursue legal action. Justice may be delayed in Kashmir, but we will continue to fight.”

== List of officeholders ==
No.	Portrait	Name (Birth–Death)	Term in office			Reference
No.	Portrait	Name (Birth–Death)	Assumed office	Left office	Time in office	Reference
1		Mohammad Abbas Ansari (1936–2022)	31 March 1962	25 October 2022	60 years, 234 days	
2		Masroor Abbas Ansari (b. 1975)	27 October 2022	Incumbent	4 years, 25 days	

== See also ==
- All Parties Hurriyat Conference
- Mohammad Abbas Ansari
- Masroor Abbas Ansari
