= Ghulam Rasool Noori =

21st-century Indian Islamic cleric

Maulana Sheikh Ghulam Rasool Noori
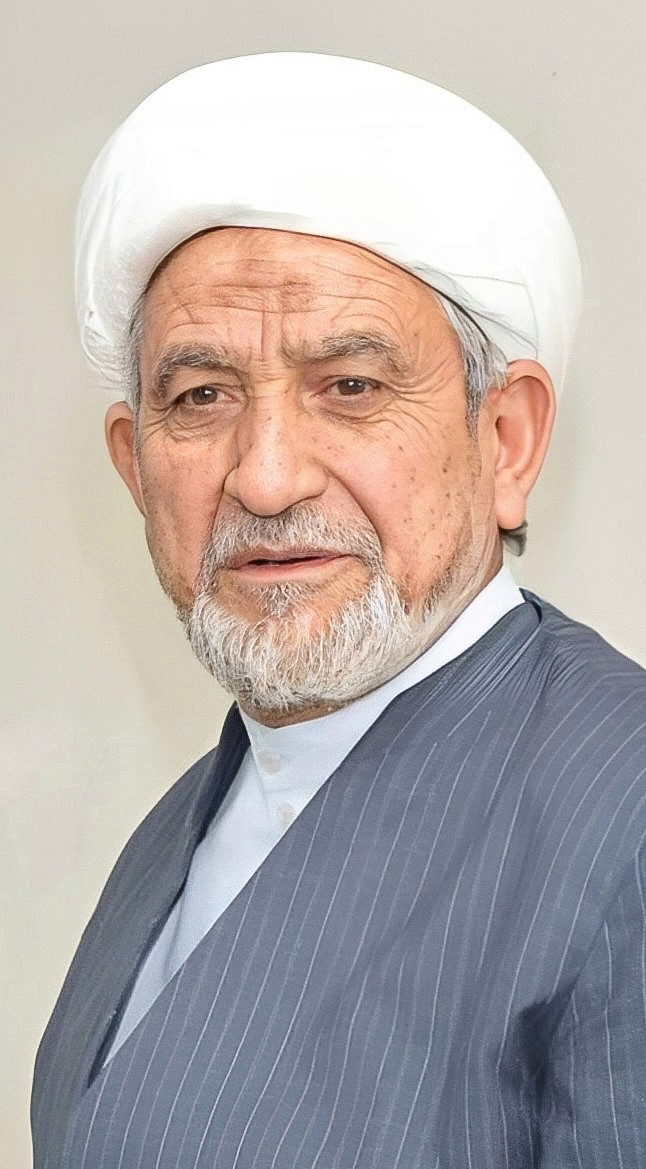

Chairman Majlis-e-Ulama-e-Imamia Jammu and Kashmir
- In office August 2021 – June 2025

Chairman and President of the Jammu and Kashmir Ahl-e-Bait Foundation.
- In office 2005–present

Patron of Idara Nashri Uloom Ahlulbait Kashmir
- In office 1998–present
- Title: Hujjatul Islam, Allamah, Sheikh

Personal life
- Born: 19 March 1954 (age 72) Gangoo, Pulwama, Kashmir
- Era: Modern era
- Region: Kashmir India
- Main interest(s): Islamic Philosophy, Quranic exegesis, Logic, Arabic Literature, Theology,
- Education: Banaras Hindu University, Jawadia Arabic College, Feyziyeh School

Religious life
- Religion: Islam
- Jurisprudence: Ja`fari
- Creed: Usuli Twelver Shi`a Islam

Muslim leader
- Influenced by: Ayatollah Khomeini Ayatollah Ali Khamenei Ayatollah Sistani Morteza Motahhari Syed Jawad Naqvi

Sheikh Ghulam Rasool Noori (Persian: شیخ غلام رسول نوری; born 19 March 1954) is a Indian Shia Muslim scholar, reformer, preacher and cleric. He is known for his religious sermons and lectures, especially during the Islamic month of Muharram. Noori delivers lectures in both the Kashmiri and Urdu languages; he is deemed as a bridge between Kashmiri and Urdu temperaments. Moreover, he is famous for his addressing of social issues through Islamic Philosophy. Before becoming a religious scholar and theologian he was working as a lecturer.

== Education ==
Noori preliminary studied under the guidance of his father who was known religious scholar of his time. After then, in 1972, he went to Banaras, India for higher studies where he studied in Jawadia Arabic College under the guidance of Ayatollah Syed Zafrul Hasan Rizvi. Noori is Fazil from Allahabad Board UP India and in 1979 he got the degree of Fakhr-ul-afazil from Jawadia Arabic College Banaras UP India. He did his master's degree from Banaras Hindu University He subsequently went to Iran for the studies of Islamic jurisprudence and Islamic theology, where he studied under the guidance of famous scholars of that time Aaqa Aatimadi, Aaqa Wijdani and Aaqa Payane.

== Positions ==
Noori was the former chairman of Majlis-e-Ulama-e-Imamia Jammu and Kashmir. he is also chairman and president of the Jammu and Kashmir Ahl-e-Bait Foundation. Noori is founder and the patron of Idara Nashri Uloom Ahlulbait Kashmir and was ex-vice principal of Jamia Elmia Imam Reza Srinagar.

== Works ==
Noori while delivering a lecture in College of Education Srinagar

Noori while delivering lecture on Quranic exegesis at Iqbal Khomeini Hall Srinagar

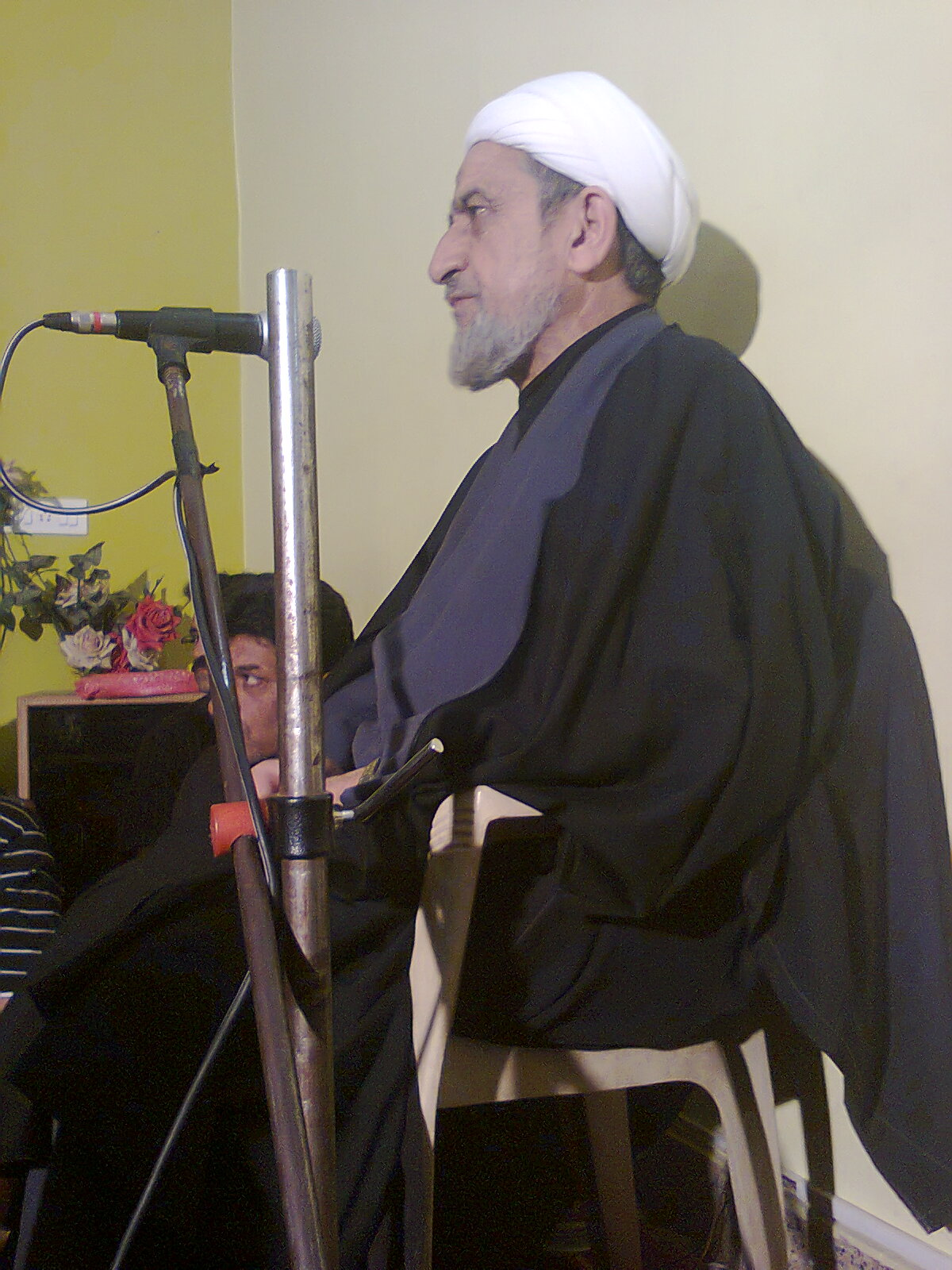
Noori addressing a Majlis in Bangalore in Muharram of 2013

Noori is known for his workings around Kashmir valley. From 1990 when he returned from Qum, He organized Islamic educational classes for the common people, young and old in Srinagar Kashmir and preached them about Islam.

=== Reformation in Azadari system ===
After his arrival from Qom, Iran, a transformation in Azadari swept through the Kashmir valley. Previously, only Marsiya were recited by the Zakirans in Muharram gatherings. However, he, with his visionary approach, revolutionized the traditional Azadari system by introducing the Ashra-Majlis system, a series of ten sermons delivered by religious scholar especially during night hours in the month of Muharram. This novel concept brought about a remarkable change as no such Ashra Majlis had been held in Kashmir before.

With his speeches across various locations in the Kashmir valley, Noori swiftly gained widespread fame. His ideology resonated deeply with the youth of Jammu and Kashmir, who embraced his teachings. Expanding his reach, he conducted extensive classes and lectures in different parts of Kashmir. Through these sessions, he preached about the profound significance of the Battle of Karbala and emphasized the responsibilities of the younger generation.

=== Educational upliftment ===
Noori worked for the upliftment of the educational level of Shia community in Kashmir valley. In the initial stages when he arrived back to Kashmir, Noori organized classes to teach different subjects especially ethics in modest rooms at different places. The impact of his words was immense, as he imparted the teachings of the Islamic religion. Additionally, he collaborated with other Islamic organizations to further advance their shared goals in this endeavor. Noori in his Friday prayer sermons mostly emphasized education and in his lectures, he shed light on how important education is for the successful society. Noori organized and participated into number of educational conferences and seminars to propagate the values. He also participated in educational conferences of different colleges as representative of Shia community. Noori is ex-vice principal of Jamia Elmia Imam Reza Srinagar where he used to teach Kalam as well and more than half of the kashmiri seminary scholars are his students. Noori has also worked as a teacher at Jawadia Arabic College Banaras.

=== Idarh Nashir e Uloom e Ahlulbait Kashmir ===
Noori laid the foundation of Idarh Nashir e Uloom e Ahlulbait in 1998. The main objective behind the establishment of this organisation was to propagate the science of Ahlulbait. It publishes different articles on different religious beliefs. The organisation organized different seminars and conferences on different religious issues

== Lectures ==
Maulana Noori has delivered number of lectures on different topics especially on Islamic Philosophy and issues related to youth both in Urdu and Kashmiri language.

- Tawheed (Monotheism)
- Life and Death
- Ma'refat-e-Imamat aur Wilayat
- Imamat
- Prophetic Mission
- Philosophy of Martyrdom
- Ma'refat-illahi

== International tours ==
Noori has travelled extensively across the globe to deliver the lectures on Moharram. In 2014, 2015 as well as in 2016, he was invited to Dubai by Indian Diaspora, where he gave a speech on brotherhood, justice and humanity. In 2012, Noorie was invited to Bangkok where he delivered speech during the month of Muharram.

== Book releases ==
Noori presided the release function of book The Creation No Evolution authored by Dr. Rouf Hussain Beig held at College of Education, Srinagar on 20 August 2006. Noted economist and dean Social Sciences, Kashmir University Professor Nisar Ali released the book, Professor Rehman Rahi and poet Dr. Shabib Rizvi were also present on the occasion.

== Awards ==
In 2017, Noori was awarded with Peer-e-Gulam for his notable works especially during the month of Muharram in Isfahan, Iran

== Ideas ==
=== Ideal State ===
According to Noori, individuals are mutually dependent upon each other for the development and betterment of the society; an ideal society is one in which members are interacting with one another to achieve the common goal. He says “an individual of an ideal society can never remain antagonistic to other members of society.” as per him “different goals can only be achieved when members of society become one, and work together.”

He views an ideal society can only be formed by the members of the society who are piety and have purified their souls. In one of his lectures, he stated “the formation of an ideal society is not possible without Taqwa”.

=== Divine Guardianship ===
Noori sees Divine Guardianship as a solution to all the problems of the world. Noori says "the solution of all the problems of the world is possible under Guardianship, the guardianship of Allah"

== Thoughts ==
=== Unity and Brotherhood ===
Hujjatul Islam Noorie promotes and backs unity among Muslim ummah. He has participated in different conferences organized by different Islamic school of thoughts that propagate unity within the Muslims. Besides that he has also delivered lectures and messages to promote unity and brotherhood within the Islamic community. Noori in an interview given to Islam Times said

"One is word of unity and one is unity of word, word of unity is present in us but there is absence of unity of word, it means Muslims should have one voice, one word. Our lord is one, our Quran is one, our Qibla is one and our interest and loss should also be one".

He stresses that the leaders of each sub community within the Islamic ummah should play the pivotal role in order to promote this value. In one of his speech he made a remarks saying that "when leaders both religious and political are united entire nation is united" which show his emphasize on the role of the people in power to achieve this goal. In an interview he said that,

There is a need for our religious heads to see how things are being presented to us. Our clerics have to see who is behind such conspiracies which are eating up our society.

This remark points out that the leaders of community according to Noori's point of view have the duty to fend off any outside threat that might lead to a discord within the Islamic society. In other sense he also made them know that one of the important characteristics of a leader is to have a vast knowledge of the threats that submerge from within or outside the community itself.

On several occasions he also defused tension that had arisen within the Islamic ummah especially in Kashmir with the speech that he has made publicly. For example, when there was a popular tendency within the Kashmiri themselves to interpret the death sentence upon Saddam Hussein to be motivated by sectarianism, he made a remark that the judgment should be viewed from the human rights and judiciary's perspective instead of the previous one, thus redirecting them towards the real issue and at the same time leaving no space for sectarian interpretation. His speech has been quoted by The Hindu, which wrote,

we should not see the judgment in the prism of sectarianism.

=== Ban on Muharram Procession ===
Hujjatul Islam Noorie has always advocated free movement of azadari processions [ moharram processions] all over the globe especially in the valley of Kashmir. The government of jammu and Kashmir has banned 8th and 10th Muharram processions in Srinagar after the eruption of militancy in 1989. Prior to ban, the 8th Muharram procession used to be taken out from Shaheed Gunj and would culminate at Dalgate while 10th Muharram procession was taken out from Abi- Guzar to Ali Park Zadibal.

Following the ban in 1989 Shia leadership and community continued to agitate peacefully and annually offered mass arrests during period of Muharram. Noori has for all time opposed the ban on moharram processions in Kashmir which he has described as infringement of right to freedom of religion. Noori in an interview given to The Citizen he said that

"It is extremely sad that when whole world promotes freedom of religion, our state Government bans the important religious procession, it is just a political game and nothing else"

Noori has accused the state government of "divide and rule politics" over moharram processions

=== Model Nikahnama ===
in July 2019 a Model Nikahnama was released by Ehsaas, a group working on empowerment of women, aimed at including broader details that would empower, strengthen or define the position of women and elaborate on their rights. Speaking on the occasion, Noori said our problem is that we don't follow Quran. "Solution of all our problems lie there. It is responsibility of ulema to spread the awareness," Noori congratulated the Ehsaas group on framing the Model Nikahnama. And hoped that it would be welcomed by public, he said "I hope it would be received well in public,"

== See also ==
- Sheikh Mussa Shariefi
