= Mawlānā =

Muslim title for educated religious leaders

Mawlana (/mɔːˈlɑːnə/; from Persian, Arabic: مولانا), also spelled as Molana or Maulana, is a title preceding, mostly in South Asia, the name of respected Muslim religious leaders, in particular graduates of religious institutions, e.g. a madrassa or a darul uloom, or scholars who have studied under other Islamic scholars.

== See also ==
- Glossary of Islam
- Imam
- Marabout
- Mawlawi
- Mullah
- Marja
- Sheikh
- Rumi, Persian poet also known as Mawlana
