= Abu al-Qasim =

Abul-Qasim أبو القاسم
- Romanization: ʾAbū al-Qāsim
- Pronunciation: Abu al-Qāsim; Abu el-Ka'sīm
- Gender: Male
- Language: Arabic

Origin
- Origin: Semitic (Arabic)
- Meaning: Father of Qasim
- Region of origin: Arabia (Middle East)

Abu al-Qasim (Arabic: أبو القاسم, romanized: ʾAbū al-Qāsim) is an kunya meaning "father of al-Qasim". It was an attributive kunya of Islamic prophet Muhammad, describing him as father to his son Al-Qasim ibn Muhammad. Since then the name has been used by the following:

== People ==
- Al-Mustakfi, also known as Abu al-Qasim Abdallah, was the Caliph of Baghdad from September 944 to 946.
- Al-Muti, also known as Abu al-Qasim al-Fadl, was the Caliph of Baghdad from 28 January 946 to 5 August 974.
- Abu al-Qasim Mahmud ibn Sabuktigin (971–1030) commonly known as Mahmud of Ghazni was the second Ghaznavid sultan reigning from 998 to 1030 AD, under whom the empire reached at its peak.
- Al-Muqtadi also known as Abu al-Qasim Abdallah was the Caliph of Baghdad from 2 April 1075 to 3 February 1094.
- Ali ibn al-Hasan al-Kalbi (died 982), Kalbid emir of Sicily
- Abu al-Qasim Kashani (died after 1324), Persian historian active in the late Ilkhanate era
- Mohamed Abu al-Qasim al-Zwai (born 1952), Secretary General of Libya's General People's Congress
- Amal Abul-Qassem Donqol (1940–1983), Egyptian poet
- Aboul-Qacem Echebbi (1909–1934), Tunisian poet
- Abu'l-Qásim Faizi (1906–1980), Persian Bahá'í
- Abu al-Qasim al-Khoei (1899–1992), Twelver Shi'a Islamic grand ayatollah (marja)
- Abolqasem Najm (1892–1981), Iranian politician, cabinet minister, and diplomat
- Abolqasem Lahouti (1887–1957), Persian poet
- Abol-Ghasem Kashani (1882–1962), Iranian Twelver Shi'a Muslim cleric
- Abul Kasem Burdwani (1872–1936), Bengali politician
- Abul Kasem Fazlul Huq (1873–1962), Prime Minister of Bengal
- Abul Kashem Khan (1905–1991), Bangladeshi politician and founder of A K Khan & Company
- Dr. Captain Abul Kasem Chatgami (1911–1999), Bangladeshi politician, teacher and doctor
- Kazi Abul Kasem Umedpuri (1913–2004), Bangladeshi polymath
- Mohammad Abul Quasem (1913–1980s), Bangladeshi politician and lawyer
- Kazi Abul Kashem Patuakhali, Bangladeshi politician
- Mohammad Abul Kashem Chatgami (1920–1991), Bangladeshi author and educationist
- A. B. Mohammad Abul Kashem Master (1939–2015), Bangladeshi politician
- Abul Kashem Fazlul Haq Kishoreganji (born 1940), Bangladeshi essayist, columnist and activist
- Abul Kashem Alalpuri (1941–2024), Bangladeshi politician
- Abul Kashem Palpari (1942–2020), Bangladeshi politician
- Khondakar Abul Kashem (1944–1971), Bengali educator
- Abul Kashem Sandwip (1944–1995), Bangladeshi educationist, journalist and organizer
- Dr. Mohammad Abul Kashem (born 1953), vice-chancellor of Hajee Mohammad Danesh Science & Technology University
- Md. Abul Kashem (born 1955), vice-chancellor of Bangladesh University of Textiles
- Md. Abul Kasem Sarker (born 1956), Bangladeshi politician
- Abul Kasem Mohammad Rezaul Majid, Bangladeshi major general
- Abul Kasem Mosharraf Hossain Akand, Bangladeshi politician
- Dr. Mohammad Abul Kasem Shariatpuri, Bangladeshi medical doctor and politician
- Abu al-Qasim al-Zayyani (1734/35–1833), Berber historian, geographer, poet and statesman from Morocco
- Abu'l-Qasim al-Tayyib (1130–unknown), Isma'ili Imam
- Abu-l-Qasim Ahmad ibn al-Husayn ibn Qasi (died 1151), leader of the opposition against the Almoravid dynasty in Al-Garb Al-Andalus
- Abu Al-Qasim Mahmud Ibn 'Umar Al-Zamakhshari (1074 or 1075–1143 or 1144), Muslim scholar
- Abu'l-Qasim ibn Hammud ibn al-Hajar (fl. 1167–1185), leader of the Sicilian Muslim community, Norman Kingdom of Sicily
- Abu'l-Qasim (Seljuq governor of Nicaea) (ruled 1084–1092)
- Abu al-Qasim Muhammad ibn Abbad (ruled 1023–1042), founder and eponym of the Abbadid dynasty in Al-Andalus
- Abu al-Qasim Ferdowsi (940–1020), Persian poet
- Abu al-Qasim al-Zahrawi (936–1013), or Abulcasis, Arab surgeon and physician who lived in Al-Andalus
- Abu Al-Qasim Al-Ansari (1040–1118), Islamic theologian who lived in Transoxiana.
- Abolghasem Alidoust (born 1961), Iranian legal scholar
- Abol-Ghasem Kashani (1882–1962), Iranian politician and ayatollah
- Abolghasem Khazali (1925–2015), Iranian politician and cleric
- Abolghasem Mozaffari (born 1967), Iranian military person
- Abolghasem Orouji (born 1989), Iranian futsal player
- Abolghasem Sakhdari (fl. 1948), Iranian wrestler
- Abolghasem Sarhaddizadeh (1945–2020), Iranian politician
- Abolghasem Wafi Yazdi (born 1935), Iranian Shia cleric
- Abu Kasim Adamu, Nigeria botanist and academics professor
- Abul Kasem Khan (1905–1991), Bangladeshi lawyer, industrialist and politician
- Abu Qasim (militant) (died 2015), Pakistani militant

== Places ==
- Abul Kasim (mountain), mountain in Ethiopia
- Abulkasym Madrassah, building in Tashkent, Uzbekistan
