= Zakir Rashid Bhat =

Kashmiri militant (1994–2019)

Founder and 1st Ameer of Ansar Ghazwat-ul-Hind
- In office 27 July 2017 – 24 May 2019
- Preceded by: Position established
- Succeeded by: Hameed Lelhari

Field operational Commander of Hizbul Mujahideen
- In office 9 July 2016 – 13 May 2017
- Preceded by: Burhan Wani
- Succeeded by: Riyaz Naikoo

Personal details
- Born: 25 July 1994 Noorpora, Jammu and Kashmir, India
- Died: 24 May 2019 Dadasara, Jammu and Kashmir, India
- Cause of death: Encounter
- Education: B.Tech
- Occupation: Engineer
- Religion: Islam

Military service
- Allegiance: Hizbul Mujahideen (2013-2017); Al-Qaeda (2017-2019)
- Branch/service: Ansar Ghazwat-ul-Hind. (2017-2019)
- Activity years: 2013–2019
- Rank: Commander of Hizbul Mujahideen (2016–2017); Commander in chief Emir of Ansar Ghazwat-ul-Hind (2017–2019)
- Battles/wars: Insurgency in Jammu and Kashmir †

Zakir Rashid Bhat (also known as Zakir Musa) was the commander of Hizbul Mujahideen after the killing of Burhan Wani and Sabzar Bhat, who were the former commanders of the same outfit. He later became the chief of the Al-Qaeda-affiliated Ansar Ghazwat-ul-Hind.

== Early life and education ==
Zakir Rashid Bhat was born in Noorpora area of Tral in the Pulwama district of the Kashmir Valley of Jammu and Kashmir, India to parents Abdul Rashid Bhat and Maimoonah Bhat. His family background has been described as upper-class and wealthy: his father Abdul Rashid Bhat was a senior engineer working with the state government, his brother is an orthopedic surgeon while his sister is a bank executive. Musa studied at Noor Public School up to 10th, and then attended the government higher secondary institution in Noorpora where he passed his 12th in 2011.

== Militancy career ==
=== Hizbul Mujahideen ===
Musa joined the Hizbul Mujahideen in 2013 after leaving his studies of Bachelor of Technology. He became the commander of the Hizbul Mujahideen after the death of Burhan Muzaffar Wani; discontent over Wani's death led to the 2016 Kashmir unrest. In August 2016, Musa issued his first video in Kashmir. He has been described as "part of a new generation of tech-savvy, well-educated terrorist" who became involved in the conflict after the 2010 Kashmir unrest.

In 2017, Musa threatened to behead the Hurriyat leaders for calling the Kashmir conflict a political, rather than a religious, objective to establish Islamic rule; he warned them not to become a "thorn" in the imposition of Sharia in Kashmir. Hizbul Mujahideen immediately disassociated itself from Musa's statement, and Musa, in response, quit the organization. In 2017, he left the group after it refused to back his public statements supporting his argument that the struggle in Kashmir was for Islam, and not for political purposes.

=== Ansar Ghazwat-ul-Hind ===
In July 2017, the Global Islamic Media Front claimed that Zakir Musa had been named the head of Ansar Ghazwat-ul-Hind, a newly created cell of Al-Qaeda. After the killing of commanders Abu Dujana and Arif Lelhari, a statement purported to be from Musa was released. The statement claimed that Dujana and Lelhari had joined Al-Qaeda and helped establish it. Officials stated that the voice of the message matched those of the earlier audio clips by Musa, though the state's DGP S.P. Vaid stated there was no way of authenticating the clips even though there were reports that Dujana and Musa were close at the time. Meanwhile, an audio-clip circulated on media that claimed to be the last message from Dujana and Arif during their encounter. Two voices claim allegiance to Al-Qaeda; however, no gunfire is heard and the authenticity of the clip was not proven.

It was reported on 12 August 2017 that Musa and his aide evaded an Indian Army and JK Police operation when locals pelted security forces with stones in Noorpora village of Tral. Allegedly according to Indian media In an audio message released on 31 August 2017, Musa attacked Pakistan for "betraying Kashmir jihad." He also stated that the objective of Al-Qaeda's Kashmir cell was to clear it from the Pakistan government, army and their sponsored agents. He also threatened to "liberate India" from the Hindus. According to Indian media, Hizbul put up posters in Sopore in September 2017, which held him responsible for helping Indian security forces kill Kashmiris, asking people to chase him to death and also called him an "Indian agent."

=== Call for return of Kashmiri Pandits ===
Musa, like his predecessor Burhan Wani, asked the Kashmiri Pandits to return to their homeland. He stated during a video released after the killing of Burhan Wani in 2016, "We request Kashmiri Pandits to return to their homes. We take the responsibility of their protection."

== Death and aftermath ==
Zakir Musa was killed after an 11-hour long operation. Musa was killed by the Indian security forces in an encounter at Dadasara village in Tral on 24 May 2019.

In the aftermath of Zakir Musa's encounter, as a preventive measure to protect civilians the government authorities snapped internet services in the entire Kashmir region. Curfew was imposed in all the major towns of the valley, including in the main city of Srinagar, also schools and colleges were ordered to remain shut in some areas.

At the time of his death, the BBC News described him as "India's most wanted militant".

== See also ==
- Afzal Guru
- Burhan Wani
- Ilyas Kashmiri
