= Burzahom archaeological site =

3000–1000 BCE site in Kashmir, India

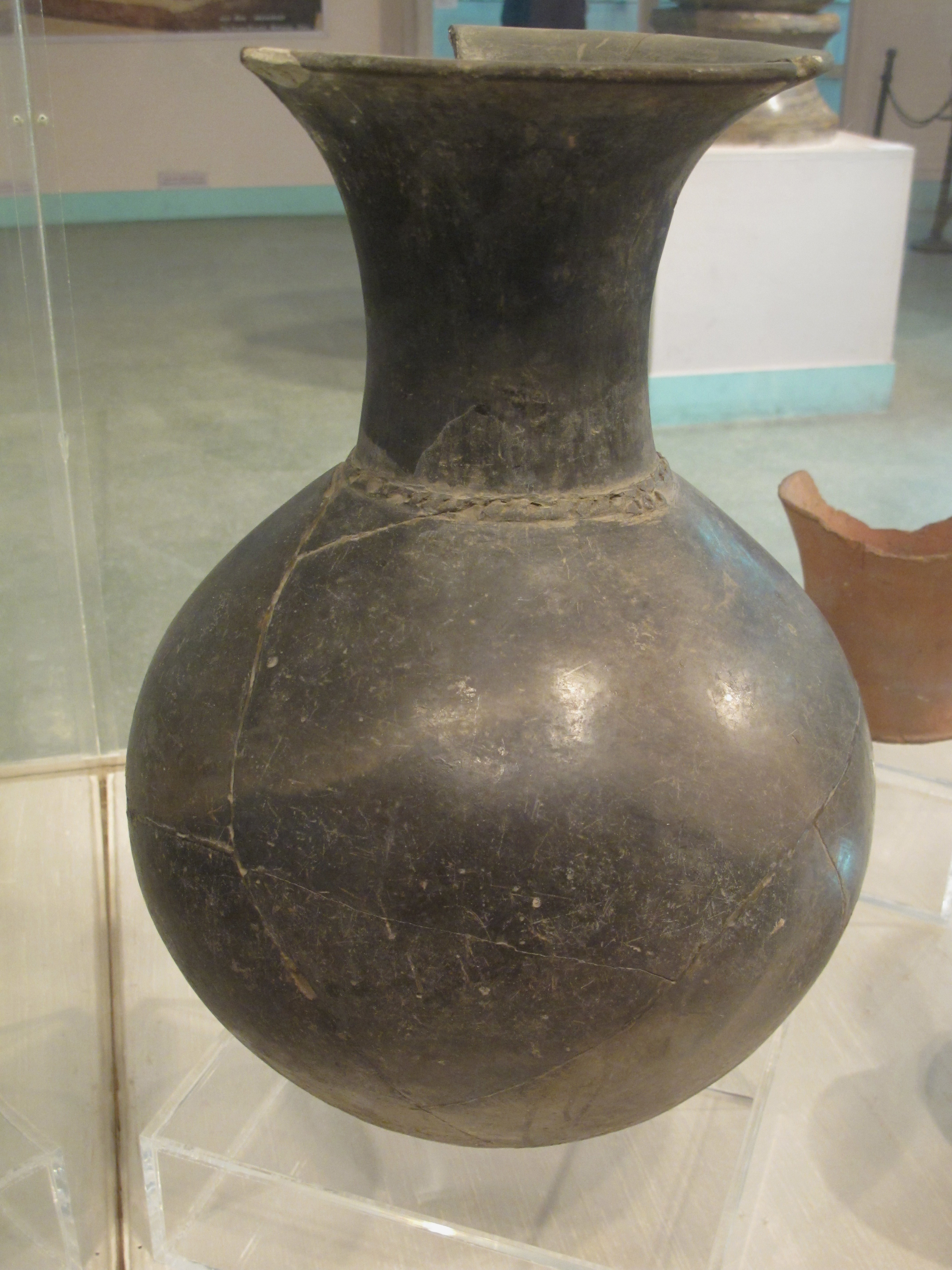
- A pot excavated from Burzahom

- Archaeological site location in Srinagar, Jammu and Kashmir, India Burzahom archaeological site (India)
- 34.169883°N 74.866841°E
- Type: Pre-historic settlement
- Periods: Neolithic, Megalithic and early Historic period.
- Location: Srinagar, Jammu & Kashmir, India

Site notes
- Excavation dates: 1939 and from 1960 to 1971
- Archaeologists: de Terra and Paterson of Yale-Cambridge Expedition in 1939 and T.N. Khazanchi and his team of ASI from 1960 and 1971

The Burzahom archaeological site is located in the Srinagar district of the Kashmir Valley in Jammu and Kashmir, India, a region disputed between India and Pakistan. Evidences of wheat were found. Archaeological excavations have revealed four phases of cultural significance between 3000 BCE and 1000 BCE. Periods I and II represent the Neolithic era; Period III the Megalithic era (of massive stone menhirs and wheel turned red pottery); and Period IV relates to the early Historical Period (Post-megalithic period). The findings, recorded in stratified cultural deposits representing prehistoric human activity in Indian Kashmir, are based on detailed investigations that cover all aspects of the physical evidence of the site, including the ancient flora and fauna.

The Burzahom site revealed the transition from the subterranean and ground level housing features of the Neolithic people to the mudbrick structures of the Megalithic people. The large cache of tools and implements made of bone and stone found at the site shows that the inhabitants were hunting and farming.

The unearthed Antiquities (of art, architecture, customs and rituals) indicate that the prehistoric people of the Burzahom established contact with Central Asia and South West Asia and also had links to the Gangetic plains and peninsular India. The interaction of local and foreign influences is demonstrated by the art, architecture, customs, rituals and language demonstrated by some engravings on pottery and other artifacts.

== Location ==
The Burzahom site is a prehistoric settlement in the village of the same name in the Srinagar District. It is 16 kilometres (9.9 mi) to the northwest of Srinagar on the Naseem-Shalimar road. The elevation of the site is 1,800 metres (5,900 ft) above sea-level. It is the northernmost excavated Neolithic site of India. The site is on an ancient Pleistocene lake bed. The location is in a high terrace which is part of the flood of the Jhelum River and has Karewa soil means clay formation. The site has a commanding view of the Dal Lake which is about 2 kilometres (1.2 mi) away. In the Kashmiri language 'Burz' means "birch", a tree species (that generally grows in the elevation range of 3,000 to 4,200 metres (9,800 to 13,800 ft) in the Himalayas), which is found in the excavated housing area in the form of roofing material, and thus confirming the existence of the tree even in the pre-historic Neolithic times.

== History ==
The first trial diggings at the Burzahom site were a limited exercise in 1936, carried out by the Yale–Cambridge Expedition headed by Helmut de Terra and Dr. Thomson Paterson. The Frontier Circle of the Archaeological Survey of India made detailed investigations of the site between 1960 and 1971; these were carried out by T.N. Khazanchi and his associates.

The extensive excavations done at this site, unearthing stratified cultural deposits, were the first of their type in Kashmir. In 1944, Mortimer Wheeler, Director General of the Archaeological Survey of India had conducted the first stratified archaeological excavations on the lines of geological model at other sites. Based on a similar model the Burzahom site has been named as the Northern Neolithic Culture in view of its distinctive structural features with profusion of tools made of bones and stones and tools representing the ritualistic practices.

Gufkral represents another related site in the area, near the town of Tral. Gufkral is located at Bandar village in Hardware area of Tral, 5 km from the sub district headquarter. The village falls between two nalla (streams) on an extensive deposit of Karewa (elevated table-land) where people used to live in ancient times. Also, Haripriya, and Anantapur, in the same area, are related.

The management and the protection of the Burzahom site, including the buffer zones, are under the jurisdiction of the Archaeological Survey of India and the State Department of Archaeology conforming to the Ancient Monuments and Sites Remains Act 1958 (Amended in 2010).

This site was nominated on 15 April 2014 for inscription as a UNESCO World Heritage Site, and is yet to be approved.

== Discovery ==
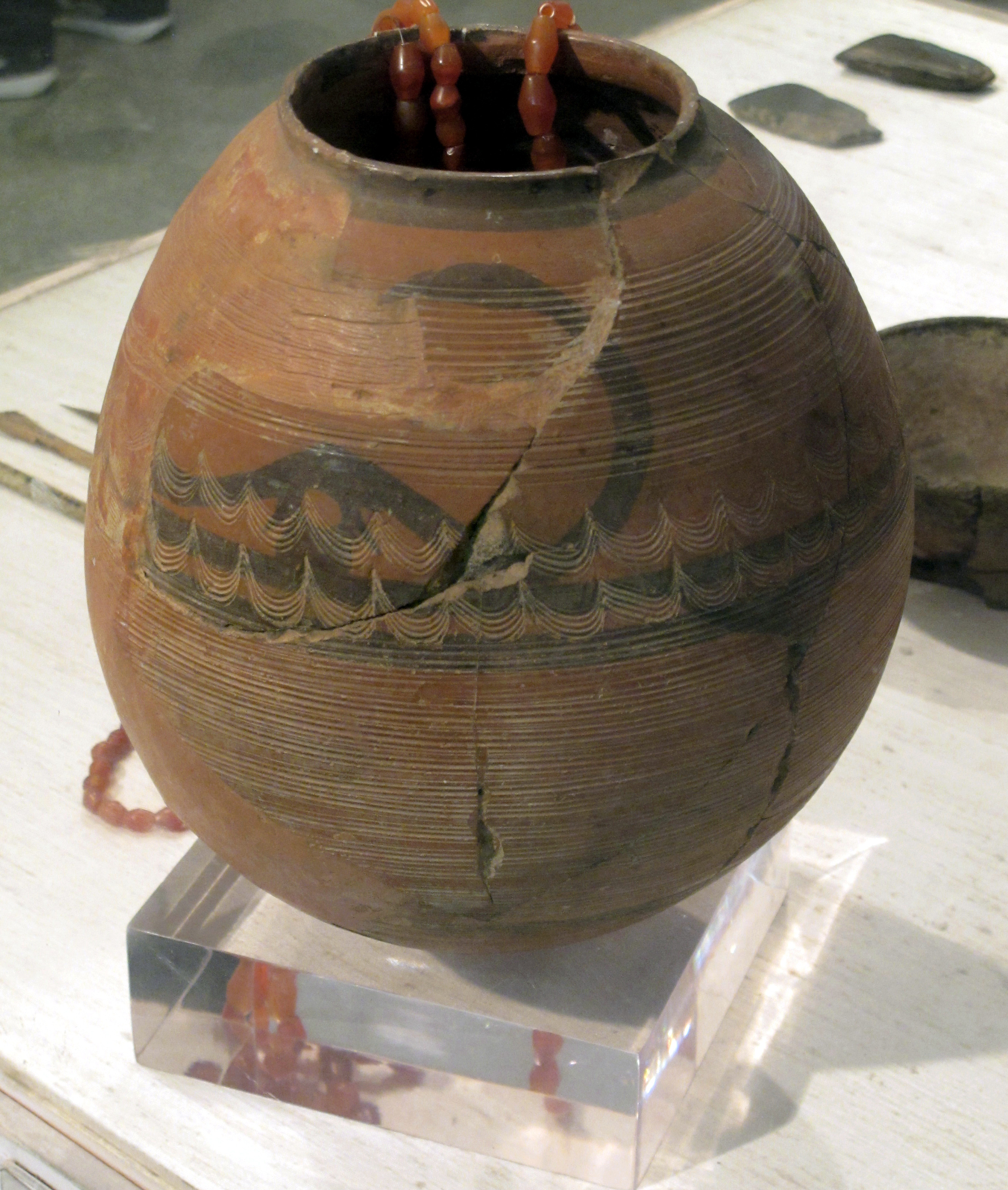
Pot, excavated from Burzahom with painting of a wild goat with long horns and hanging ears.

The excavation at Burzahom was carried out in both vertical (depth wise) and horizontal directions; the depth provided the stratification features while the phasing of each stratification was provided by the horizontal excavations. Four periods of continuous occupational sequence at the site were documented over a period of 11 years of investigations from 1960 to 1971. These are: Periods I and II of the Neolithic (Period I is called aceramic and Period II is called ceramic) origin, particularly characterized by dwelling pits (the largest measuring 2.74 metres (9 ft 0 in) at the top to 4.75 metres (15.6 ft) at the base at a depth of 3.95 metres (13.0 ft)); Period III of the Megalithic sequence noted by the free standing large stone Menhirs installed at the site by shifting boulders manually from the hills; and Period IV of the early Modern Period. The skeletal remains of the Neolithic humans found at Burzahom are similar to those found in Harappa of the Indus Valley Civilisation.

Burzahom's ceramic industry was mostly of hunting based culture and is different from the Chinese Neolithic pottery. The economy of the people was found to be based on hunting and gathering with a nascent stage of cultivation practices. Pottery made in Burzahom showed close affinity to those found in the Swat valley in present-day Pakistan, particularly in respect of its shapes and decorations of the black ware pottery. The burial practices and type of tools recovered from the site were inferred as having close resemblance to those found in the North Chinese Neolithic culture.

=== Period I ===
The remarkable find during this period was of pits which were inferred as dwelling units; these were in circular or oval shape dug in compact natural Karewa soil formation. Some of the deep pits had steps and ladder access to the bottom level. In some of the pits the stratification revealed ash and charcoal layers, which denoted human occupancy. Post holes on the sides of pits at the surface level denoted the presence of superstructures covered with thatch made of birch. Shallow pits of circular shape of 60–91 centimetres (24–36 in) diameter adjoining the housing pits were found to contain bones of animals and also tools made of bones (of antlers used for making tools) and stones (harpoons, needles with or without eyes, awls).

Carbon dating established that the earliest occupation at the site was dated to before 2,357 BC.

The pottery found at the site were in an early stage of hand crafting, of the coarse variety, in steel-grey, dull red, brown, and buff colours with mat prints at the bottom; they were in the shape of bowl, vase and stem. The antiquities did not reveal any signs of burials sites.

Late Kot-Diji type pots were found belonging to Period Ib.

=== Period II ===
In the Period II, the finds excavated revealed that people had moved out from pit dwelling to structures built at the ground level. However, the pits and its associated chambers formed the base floor of the superstructure, which was made up by filling the pits and covering it with mud plaster, and occasionally painted in red ochre. Post-holes around the pits revealed that the superstructures were made of wood built over compacted Karewa soil floors.

This period also brought out, for the first time, the burial customs of the Neolithic people. Both human and animal skeletons were found in deep oval shaped pits, located either below the floors of the dwelling units or in its precincts. These pits were filled with ash, stones and potsherds. Some of the human skulls found here had trepanning (bored hole) marks. In many pits, bones of dogs and antlered deer were found along with human skeletons. The skeletons of humans were found in the burial pits in a sitting position along with bones of animals.

Pottery finds showed better finish compared to the earlier Period I. The pots were of polished black ware, mostly handmade, in the form of a dish with stand, a high-necked jar, and so forth. Also found was a wheel turned red ware pot which contained 950 beads made from carnelian and agate (inferred as items for sale), which was thought to belong to the later part of this period. A very impressive painted pottery ware recovered from this period was a globular red ware pot made on a turntable; the painting on the pot was of a wild goat of black colour with long horns and hanging ears. Another pottery item which is of interest is a polished black ware in globular shape jar with a long neck and flaring mouth.

An interesting find of this period is of two standalone finished flat stone slabs. The carving on one is not distinct. The other stone slab is 48–27 centimetres (19–11 in) which depicts, on one polished side, sketches of hunting scenes such as a hunter spearing (with a Ker) an antlered deer and another hunter in the process of releasing an arrow, and a sketch of the sun and hb 9 supernova observation. The carved figures are distinctly visible.

Agricultural practices were noted during the Periods I and II and crops grown were inferred as wheat, barley and lentil; finding lentils established a link of the Neolithic people with Central Asia, crossing over the Himalayas. The presence of stone harvesting knives and millet on the other hand points to contact with cultures originating from the Yellow River, presumably through the Tibetan plateau (for instance Karuo culture).

The people who resided here were characterized as "long headed dolichocranic". Two female skulls, different from the male skulls, were also reported. The finds did not indicate of any external ethnic intrusions during the entire Neolithic period but showed more affinity to the Harappan people.

Burzahom represents the southernmost extent of what is known as Northern Neolithic culture of Asia.

=== Period III ===
Some Megalithic Period Menhirs are next to Neolithic pits, suggesting a gradual transition between the two phases. The Menhirs, boulders formed due to the varying temperatures, were brought down from the hills with great effort by the people and installed to mark notable events of the community. These are rough in shape, huge and of considerable weight and height, and are "free-standing". Craftsmanship was superior during this period with finds of wheel made durable hard red ware, copper objects, and tools made of bone and stone. Structures made of rubble were also found. Finds of a few copper arrowheads indicated knowledge of metallurgy.

=== Period IV ===
Period IV (dated to the 3rd–4th century AD), the last phase of human occupation at Burzahom, was related to the early Historical Period. The structures built were superior compared to the earlier period, and were made from mud-bricks. Pottery was also superior, of red ware type with slips and wheel turned. Some iron antiquaries were also found.

== Preservation ==
The site is maintained in the form that has been excavated, representing the natural setting of the Neolithic people. The exposed pits and the layout are well protected and well preserved.

== See also ==
- Chirand
- Sothi (archaeology)
- Siswal
- Gufkral

== Bibliography ==
- Kaw, M. K. (1 January 2004). Kashmir and Its People: Studies in the Evolution of Kashmiri Society. APH Publishing. ISBN 978-81-7648-537-1.
- Singh, Upinder (2008). A History of Ancient and Early Medieval India: From the Stone Age to the 12th Century. Pearson Education India. ISBN 978-81-317-1120-0.
- Sopory, S.K. (1 January 2004). Glimpses Of Kashmir. APH Publishing. ISBN 978-81-7648-547-0.
