= Naved =

Naved (Urdu: نوید) is a surname and male given name. Notable people with this name include:

== Surname ==
- Faisal Naved (born 1980), Pakistani cricket player
- Kashif Naved (born 1983), Pakistani cricket player
- Mohammad Naved, Pakistani terrorist
- Mohammad Naved (cricketer) (born 1988), Pakistani cricket player
- Rana Naved-ul-Hasan (born 1978), Pakistani cricket player

== Given name ==
- Naved Ahmed (cricketer, born 1971) (born 1971), Pakistani cricket player
- Naved Ahmed (cricketer, born 1978) (born 1978), Pakistani cricket player
- Naved Ahmed (cricketer, born 1986) (born 1986), Indian cricket player
- Naved Anjum (born 1963), Pakistani cricket player
- Naved Arif (born 1981), Pakistani cricket player
- Naved Ashraf (born 1974), Pakistani cricket player
- Naved Aslam, Indian actor and screenwriter
- Naved Jaffrey, creator of Boogie Woogie (Indian TV series)
- Naved Latif (born 1976), Pakistani cricket player
- Naved Malik (born 1986), Pakistani cricket player
- Naved Sarwar (born 1989), Pakistani cricket player
- Naved Yasin (born 1987), Pakistani cricket player
