= Ansar Ghazwat-ul-Hind =

Al-Qaeda-affiliated Islamist militant group in Kashmir

- أنصار غزوة الهند
- Flag of Ansar Ghazwat-ul-Hind
- Founders: Zakir Rashid Bhat †; Abu Dujana †; Arif Lelhari †
- Ameer: Zakir Rashid Bhat † (2017–19); Hameed Lelhari † (2019); Imtiyaz Shah † (2019–21); Unknown (2021–present)
- Deputy leader: Soliha Mohammad Akhoon † (2017–18); Burhan Koka † (2018–20); Unknown (2021–present)
- Chief Commander: Mustafa Abdul Kareem (since 2023)
- Spokesperson: Talha Abdul Rahman
- Dates active: July 2017–present
- Allegiance: Islamic Emirate of Afghanistan; Al-Qaeda; AQIS
- Group: Ansar ut-Tawhid wal-Jihad Hind
- Active regions: Jammu and Kashmir
- Ideology: Islamic Jihad; Ghazwa-e-Hind; Separatism
- Status: active
- Size: Unknown
- Wars: Kashmir conflict and the Insurgency in Jammu and Kashmir

Ansar Ghazwat-ul-Hind (Urdu: أنصار غزوة الهند, lit. 'Partisans of the Conquest of Hind') is an Al-Qaeda-affiliated Islamist militant group active in Kashmir. The group's stated objective is to create Kashmir as an independent Islamic state under Sharia law and to fight jihad against Indian administration of Jammu and Kashmir.

== Background ==
Zakir Rashid Bhat was an Islamist Kashmiri militant and separatist leader popularly known as Zakir Musa. He was a former field operational commander of Hizbul Mujahedeen. In May 2017, Musa criticized the Hurriyat leaders for calling the Kashmir conflict a political objective rather than a religious one to establish an Islamic state ruled with Sharia. He warned them not to become a "thorn" in the imposition of Sharia in Kashmir, but after a few hours, Hizbul Mujahideen immediately disassociated itself from Zakir Musa's statement and Zakir Musa in response quit the organization after releasing statements to support his argument that the struggle in Kashmir was not for political purposes. Following Musa's split, Pro-Zakir Musa Kashmiri militants formed a militant faction named Zakir Musa Army 313 to openly support Musa and his "Islamic Rule" ideology.

In July 2017, the faction joined Al-Qaeda as Musa was impressed by Al-Qaeda's religious objective of imposing Sharia law in Kashmir and he formed a new cell of Al-Qaeda named Ansar Ghazwat-ul-Hind. In the same month, the Global Islamic Media Front-affiliated Al Hurr media channel of Ansar Ghazwat-ul-Hind claimed that Zakir Musa had been named the head of Ansar Ghazwat-ul-Hind, a newly created cell of Al-Qaeda. After the killing of militant commander Abu Dujana and Arif Lelhari, a statement purported to be from Musa was released. The statement claimed that Abu Dujana and Arif Lelhari left Lashkar-e-Taiba, had joined Al-Qaeda and helped Musa to establish a new cell of Al-Qaeda in Kashmir. Officials stated that the voice in the video matched that of the earlier audio clips by Musa, though the state's DGP S.P. Vaid stated there was no way of authenticating the clips even though there were reports that Dujana and Musa were close at the time. Meanwhile, an audio clip circulated on media that claimed to be the last message from Dujana and Arif during their encounter. Two voices claim allegiance to Al-Qaeda; however, no gunfire is heard and the authenticity of the clip was not proven.

Zakir Musa was one of the most wanted militants in Jammu and Kashmir after Burhan Wani with a bounty of ₹10 Lakh on his head announced by the Government of India. In November 2017 the Ansar Ghazwat-ul-Hind formed an alliance with Hizbul Mujahideen. After the meeting of Riyaz Naikoo with Ansar Ghazwat-ul-Hind, Zakir Musa released an audio tape after a few days of meetings, where he called all Kashmiri Mujahideen groups to unite for Jihad against enemies of Islam, with the goal to achieve freedom from India and enforce a Sharia law-based Islamic revolution in the region. He also warned "Don't forget Kashmir if Pakistan withdraws its support to Kashmir, the insurgency would be also fought inside Pakistan". Afterward, Syed Salahuddin, the chief of Hizbul Mujahideen, released a statement threatening the Pakistan Army: 'We are fighting for Kashmiri Muslims in Kashmir and if Pakistan army withdraws its support, the war would be fought inside Pakistan too'.

== Objective ==
Days after its formation, Ansar Ghazwat-ul-Hind claimed that it was against Lashkar-e-Taiba, Jaish-e-Mohammed, and Hizbul Mujahideen, who rejected both Al-Qaeda's and the Islamic State's propaganda. The Ansar Ghazwat-ul-Hind also threatened Pakistan's ISI, including groups affiliated with it in Kashmir and its leader Zakir Musa also criticized the Pakistan establishment for "betraying the Kashmiri jihad." He stated that the objective of Al-Qaeda's Kashmir cell was to clear it from the Pakistan government, army and their sponsored agents he also threatened to "liberate India" from the Hindus and Musa, like his predecessor Burhan Wani, asked the Kashmiri Pandits to return to their homeland he stated during a video released after the killing of Burhan Wani in 2016, "We request Kashmiri Pandits to return to their homes. We take the responsibility of their protection." afterwards in response the United Jihad Council chairman and Hizbul Mujahideen leader, Syed Salahuddin, stated that the Kashmiri jihad movement is indigenous, and does not have a worldwide caliphate goal, and claimed that both Al-Qaeda-affiliated groups and the ISIS are attempts by the Indian government to ruin the image of the Kashmiri resistance movement but after few months Ansar Ghazwat-ul-Hind officially announced alliance with Pakistan affiliated groups especially with Hizbul Mujahideen in Kashmir against India and Al-Qaeda-affiliated Global Islamic Media Front released a video announcing Al Hurr as the channel of Ansar Ghazwat-ul-Hind.

It also claimed that the group's main objective is to impose Sharia law upon Kashmir under Shia-Sunni unity and also declaring jihad against Indian administration of Jammu and Kashmir in the process it also aims to spread the Islamic state caliphate to Jammu and Kashmir opposing democracy as being in violation of Sharia or Islamic law, rather than to split from India or to merge with Pakistan.

== Etymology ==
The group derives its name from the Islamic prophecy of Ghazwa-e-Hind, the ultimate conquest of India. Arabic word "Ansar" means supporters.

== Slogans ==
Ansar Ghazwat-ul-Hind claims to have two slogans: the first being "Kashmir Banega Darul Islam" (Kashmir will become [a] house of Islam) and the second being "Shariat ya shahadat" (Sharia or martyrdom).

== Allegiance to Al-Qaeda and Taliban ==
In July 2017, the Global Islamic Media Front Affiliated Al Hurr media Channel of Ansar Ghazwat-ul-Hind claimed that Zakir Musa had been named the head of Ansar Ghazwat-ul-Hind under the allegiance to Al-Qaeda, In September 2021, The group released a letter on social media in which group announced allegiance to Afghan Taliban after the takeover in Afghanistan.

== Foreign fighters ==
The Ansar Ghazwat-ul-Hind claims to have many foreign fighters in Kashmir from Pakistan and Afghanistan to join its jihad (holy war) against India.

== Activities ==
Ansar Ghazwat-ul-Hind primarily operates in the Indian territory of Jammu and Kashmir, and has also claimed responsibility for several attacks against Indian forces and government officials throughout the broader Kashmir region. The group has an estimated several hundred fighters and it has made use of social media videos, audios and posters to spread its propaganda through Al-Qaeda-affiliated media outlets called Al Hurr and Al-Sindh Media.

=== 2017 ===
On 7 December 2017, the group released a statement that condemned President Donald Trump's declaration of moving the United States embassy in Israel from Tel Aviv to Jerusalem.

On 25 December 2017, in a video of a Kashmiri militant declaring allegiance to the Islamic State of Iraq and the Levant and declaring a new ISIL Province in Kashmir, the fighter called on Ansar Ghazwat-ul-Hind to give allegiance to ISIL and wage jihad in Kashmir against the Indian government, but the group declined.

=== 2018 ===
In February 2018, the group released a video of Musa calling on Indian Muslims to attack Indian army patrols and checkpoints as well as Israeli companies interested in investing in India.

In April 2018, the group published material that encouraged Muslims across India and Kashmir to carry out lone wolf attacks.

On 15 November 2018, the Indian Security Forces claimed that Ansar Ghazwat-ul-Hind leader Musa appeared in Punjab. In December of the same year, the security forces claimed that Musa reappeared in Punjab.

On 18 November 2018, militia armed men threw grenades and opened fire at a Central Reserve Police Force (CRPF) camp in Kakapora, Jammu and Kashmir. One CRPF member was killed, and two others were injured in the attack. Jaish-e-Mohammad (JeM) claimed responsibility for the attack, but authorities suspected Ansar Ghazwat-ul-Hind carried out said attack.

=== 2019 ===
On 8 July 2019, Al-Qaeda leader Ayman Al-Zawahiri released a video titled, 'Don't forget Kashmir', (in Arabic) in which Zawahiri urged unification of Jihadists against India and freeing Kashmir from the clutches of "infidel India" and the "apostate state" of Pakistan. He further criticized the government of Pakistan and the Pakistan Army for its role in the decline of attacks against Indian forces in Jammu and Kashmir under the pressure of America and condemns the killing of Ansar Ghazwat-ul-Hind founder Zakir Musa, he also calls Musa and his predecessor Burhan Wani as notable Islamic martyrs of Kashmir describing them as role models of Muslim youth for global Jihad against the enemies of Islam.

On 21 November 2019, the group released an audio tape condemning the Indian court ruling on the Babri Masjid. It urged Muslims to retaliate against the decision and urged jihadists in Kashmir to intensify their attacks.

=== 2020 ===
On 6 January 2020, the group released a tape message to Muslims of Kashmir and India by Talha Abdul Rahman, the Spokesperson of group, condemning the 2020 Delhi riots by Hindu nationalists against the Indian Muslims in Delhi. The group urged Muslims to unite against Hindutva ideology, and he called Muslims to join the jihad against the enemies of Islam.

=== 2022 ===
On 18 January 2022, the group claimed responsibility for an attempted bomb attack in Ghazipur, Delhi. The group also claimed that the targets are pro-Hindutva Hindu nationalists in revenge for the 2020 Delhi riots against the Indian Muslims in Delhi by Hindu nationalists.

=== 2025 ===
Before the 2025 Delhi car explosion, the Indian police arrested Muzammil Ahmad Ganai from Pulwama and Adeel Majeed Rather from Qazigund, both of whom were doctors and are alleged to be part of a terrorist cells linked to the Islamist militant groups, Jaish-e-Mohammed and Ansar Ghazwat-ul-Hind.

== Operations against Ansar Ghazwat-ul-Hind ==
On 21 December 2018, deputy leader Soliha Mohammad Akhoon, also known as Rehaan Khan, was killed in an encounter with 42 Rashtriya Rifles and the CRPF, along with five other militants.

On 24 May 2019, Indian security forces killed Zakir Musa in an encounter in Tral region of Jammu and Kashmir. Security forces had to blast a chemist's house where Musa was hiding. The owner was sent in for negotiation to surrender, but Musa declined and continue the gunfight until he killed. At Musa's funeral was attended by more than 10,000 people, and there were protests by supporters or people who mourned.

On 22 October 2019, Indian security forces killed Hameed Lehari in an encounter in Awantipora, Jammu and Kashmir. He was the second leader of the organisation.

Jammu and Kashmir's Director General of Police, Dilbag Singh, said that the Ansar Ghazwat-ul-Hind had been "wiped out of Kashmir" on 23 October 2019.

On 22 April 2020, four militants of the group were killed in Shopian district's Melhora village during an encounter with Indian Army's 55 Rashtriya Rifles and the CRPF. Two over ground workers of Ansar Ghazwat-ul-Hind had been captured in Pulwama district on 22 May.

On 29 April 2020, Group's deputy chief Burhan Koka was killed in an encounter in Shopian's Melhora area. along with 2 other associates.

On 9 April 2021, Jammu and Kashmir's Director General of Police, Dilbag Singh, said that the Ansar Ghazwat-ul-Hind has been "wiped out of Kashmir" once again, after seven militants—including its chief—were killed in an encounter.

On 11 July 2021, Prashant Kumar of ADG Law and Order, UP, stated, “ATS UP has uncovered a big militant module. The team has arrested two militant linked with Al-Qaeda's Ansar Ghazwat-ul-Hind.”

On 14 June 2022, Jammu and Kashmir Police announced the killing of Kashmiri militant Abdullah Abbas Ghazi Bhat, also known as Abdullah Ghazi in an encounter, he was a senior member of Ansar Ghazwat-ul-Hind, an Al-Qaeda linked group. Police claimed he was reportedly killed with two Hizbul Mujahideen militants by Indian security forces during a secret counter-terrorism search operation on the behalf of Indian intelligence report on 11 June. He had been fighting alongside Hizbul Mujahideen militants in Kulgam and was killed in a exchange of fire in the town of Kulgam. The two Indian security forces were killed, while five were injured during the clash the security forces destroyed his home and hideout. On 14 June, a few days after his death, four Indian army soldiers were killed in lone wolf attacks at various locations and the main leading member of search operation a Jammu and Kashmir Police senior officer, was also murdered outside of his house on same day and police claimed that the officer was stabbed multiple times by a sharp lethal weapon in what is believed to have been a reprisal for Ghazi's death, however no group claim the responsibility and authorities suspected the over-ground worker loyalists of Al-Qaeda, Lashkar-e-Taiba and Jaish-e-Mohammed behind it.

In September 2022, two members of AGuH were killed by security forces near Srinagar city.

On October 19, 2025, Jammu and Kashmir Police conducted an operation against an inter-state terror module linked to Jaish-e-Mohammed and Ansar Ghazwat-ul-Hind, after discovering posters threatening security forces, which revealed this module was actively involved in identifying, radicalising, and recruiting individuals, alongside raising funds, arranging logistics, and procuring arms/ammunition for Improvised Explosive Devices (IEDs).

== See also ==
- Hizbul Mujahideen
- Lashkar-e-Taiba
- Jaish-e-Mohammed
- Osama bin Laden
