= Wafaa Bilal =

Iraqi American artist

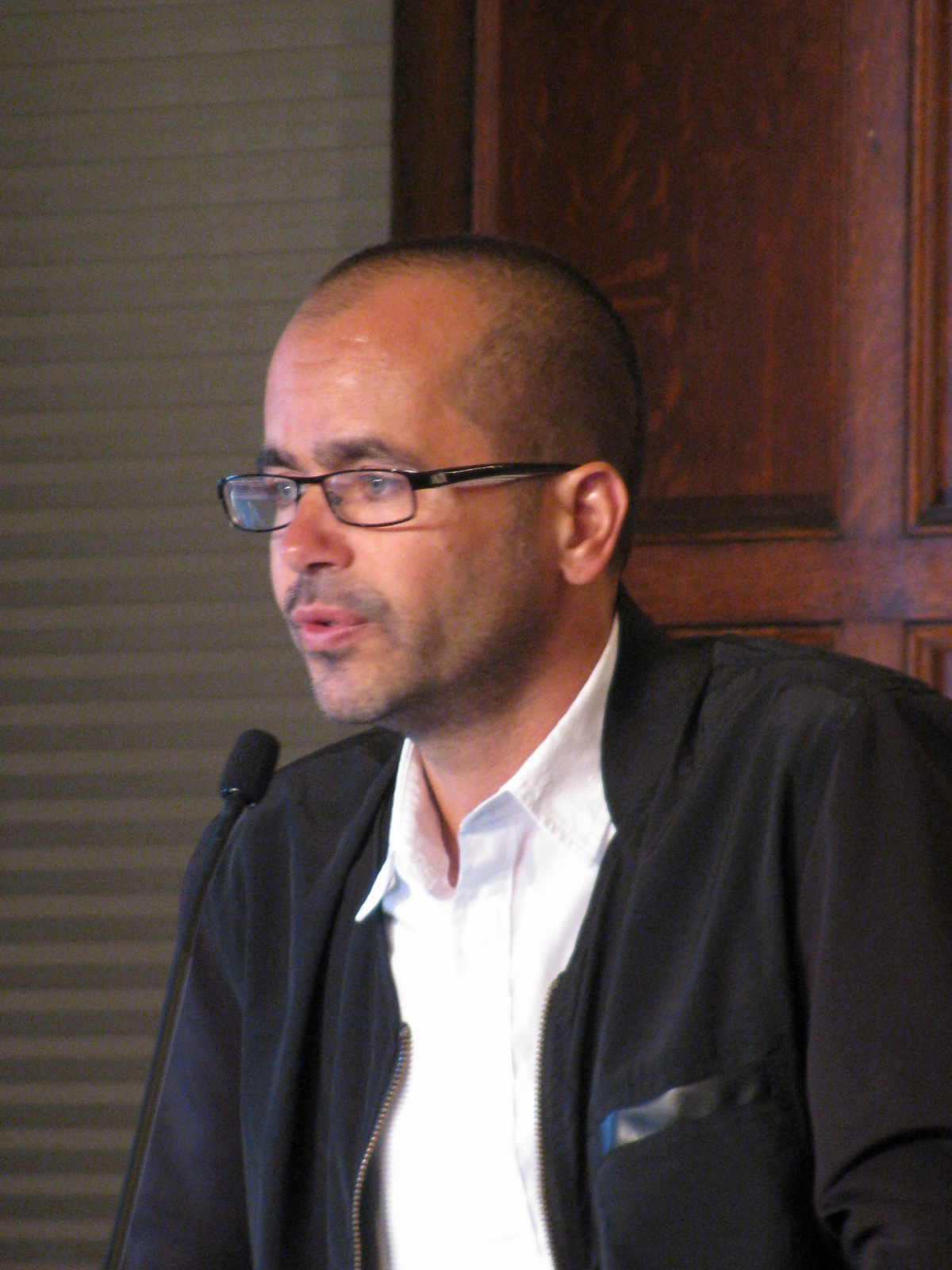
- Wafaa Bilal, 2013
- Born: June 10, 1966 (age 60); Najaf, Iraq
- Education: B.F.A., 1999 (University of New Mexico), M.F.A., 2003 (School of the Art Institute of Chicago), Honorary Ph.D., 2019 (DePauw University)
- Known for: Interactive Art, New Media Art, Performance Art, Photography
- Notable work: 168:1, Canto III, Domestic Tension, The 3rd I
- Website: Wafaabilal.com

Dr. Wafaa Bilal (Arabic: وفاء بلال [wæfæ bɪlˤɑːlˤ]; born June 10, 1966) is an Iraqi American artist, a former professor at the School of the Art Institute of Chicago and currently an art professor at the Tisch School of the Arts at New York University. He is a Creative Capital Award winner in 2021 for his project In a Grain of Wheat: Cultivating Hybrid Futures in Ancient Seed DNA and named one of Foreign Policy magazine's Leading 100 Global Thinkers in 2016 for his work as an advocate. Bilal's work, Canto III, was included as part of the Iranian pavilion at the 2015 Venice Biennale. Bilal's current work 168:01 brings awareness to cultural destruction and promotes the collective healing process through education and audience participation. He is best known for his work, Domestic Tension, a performance piece in which he lived in a gallery for a month and was shot by paintballs remotely by internet users watching from a webcam and for his book, Shoot an Iraqi: Art, Life, and Resistance under the Gun, based on that performance, which details the horrors of living in a conflict zone and growing up under Saddam Hussein's regime. He holds a BFA from the University of New Mexico, an MFA from the School of the Art Institute of Chicago, and was conferred an honorary Ph.D. from DePauw University.

== Life ==
Bilal's family is from Najaf, Iraq. He grew up during a particularly turbulent period of Iraq's history and his experience of war and revolution has informed his art. He dreamed of becoming an artist but was prohibited from studying art in a university in Iraq, because of the alleged disloyalty of a member of his family; he studied geography instead. He continued to produce artworks with themes that were critical of the Saddam Hussein regime. For this, he was arrested as a dissident.

In 1991, after refusing to volunteer to participate in the invasion of Kuwait and organizing opposition groups, he fled Iraq and lived in a refugee camp in Saudi Arabia for two years, teaching art to children. In this way Bilal became part of a generation of Iraqi artists and intellectuals who were forced into exile, where they were isolated from their heritage and current Iraqi art practices.

In 1992 he travelled to the United States to study art at the University of New Mexico in Albuquerque, from which he graduated with a BFA in 1999. He later moved to Chicago, where he earned an MFA from the School of the Art Institute of Chicago in 2003, and became an adjunct assistant professor the following year. In addition to his art he has given lectures about Saddam Hussein's regime and was interviewed by the History Channel.

== Domestic Tension ==
In May 2007, Bilal began a 30-day-long project called Domestic Tension in protest of the Iraq War. During the installation piece, Bilal confined himself to a small room at the FlatFile Galleries, located in Chicago. Although the artist was confined, he could be seen twenty-four hours a day through a camera that he had connected to the Internet. In addition to the camera, Bilal set up a remote-controlled paintball gun that viewers could use to shoot him at any time. The gun shot foul-smelling yellow paint and emitted a sound as loud as a semiautomatic gun each time it went off.

The inspiration for Domestic Tension stemmed from Bilal's experiences in refugee camps during the rule of Saddam Hussein, losing members of his family in the war, and trying to cope with the reality of war as it raged on the other side of the world. One day, Bilal learned that his people were being killed by soldiers who were not even stationed in Iraq—they had the power to shoot missiles "from an armchair in front of a computer somewhere, as if it were all some kind of video game."

The performance took its toll on Bilal, not only physically, but mentally and emotionally as well. Confined within the gallery, Bilal had no way to escape the constant threat of the paintball gun, the deafening sound of the semiautomatic, or the feedback he received from viewers watching his every move online. In addition to the physical welts he received from the paintball pellets, the artist became so overwhelmed by the constant threat of being shot that he experienced post-traumatic stress, as if he were actually in a war zone. In the chat room attached to the video feed, Bilal was constantly berated by his viewers, who accused him of trying to escape from the gun or even claimed that the performance was being faked. Whenever Bilal wasn't complying with what the viewers wanted, they would become angry, sometimes leaving comments full of "racism and explicit demonizing of all Otherness." Overall, a total of 60,000 shots were fired over the course of 30 days by "shooters" from 128 different countries.

Wafaa Bilal turned his experience from Domestic Tension into a book entitled Shoot an Iraqi: Art, Life and Resistance Under the Gun. The book serves as an autobiography, as well as an explanation of the performance piece.

== Virtual Jihadi ==
Wafaa Bilal created a computer based art piece titled Night of Bush Capturing: Virtual Jihadi which is a modified version of the game Quest for Bush, itself a "hacked" version of the popular commercial video game Quest for Saddam. While in the real game players target the ex-Iraqi leader, in Wafaa's modified version the artist casts himself as a suicide bomber who gets sent on a mission to assassinate President George W. Bush. On his website, Bilal says,

This artwork is meant to bring attention to the vulnerability of Iraqi civilians, to the travesties of the current war, and to expose racist generalizations and profiling. Similar games such as "Quest for Saddam" or "America's Army" promote stereotypical, singular perspectives. My artwork inverts these assumptions, and ultimately demonstrates the vulnerability to recruitment by violent groups like Al Qaeda because of the U.S. occupation of Iraq. In these difficult times, when we are at war with another nation, it is our duty as artists and citizens to improvise strategies of engagement for dialogue. This platform is a piece of fiction that uses the video game format to create alternative narratives and perspectives. Because we inhabit a comfort zone far from the trauma of conflict zone, we Americans have become desensitized to the violence of war. We are disconnected, disengaged while many others do the suffering. The game holds up a mirror that reveals our own propensities for violence, racism and propaganda. We can close our eyes, our ears and deny that it exists, but the issue won't go away.

In late February 2008 Wafaa Bilal was invited by Rensselaer Polytechnic Institute (Troy, New York) to present a lecture on this latest work. On March 6, the day after Wafaa's lecture, the RPI administration said they would not allow the exhibit to be supported on campus, and has since declined to reopen it. The decision came after the College Republicans called the Arts department "a safe haven for terrorists" on their blog. The statement has since been retracted. The institute has been subsequently criticized by advocates of free speech and artistic freedom.

== Dog or Iraqi ==
Wafaa was asked to participate in a net art piece called Dog or Iraqi while an artist in residence at Rensselaer Polytechnic Institute. He let his audience decide which one – a dog named "Buddy," or an Iraqi, himself – will be waterboarded at an "undisclosed location" in upstate New York.

== The 3rd I ==
Bilal's The 3rd I project was exhibited in the Mathaf: Arab Museum of Modern Art in Qatar on December 30, 2010. Bilal had a titanium plate implanted in the back of his head, to which a camera was attached. For one year, which began December 15, 2010, an image was captured once per minute and streamed live to www.3rdi.me and the Mathaf: Arab Museum of Modern Art. The website also showed his location via GPS. Bilal said that he wanted to capture the mundane while not knowingly taking the pictures. In an attempt to assuage privacy concerns, Bilal's university required him to cover the camera while on campus. On February 4, 2011, Bilal had the camera removed due to constant pain.

== Other works ==
He considers himself a political artist, dealing with war and oppression, and the Iraqi experience. He considers his main influence his experience growing up under the repression and violence of Baathist Iraq. He has also been inspired by his experiences of injustice and suffering in the United States. He has produced photographs and video installations that explore these emotions and conditions in hyperreality.

For example, his work Raze 213 had viewers smell a piece of meat decaying in acid; it was shut down by the New Mexico health authorities. It was a reference to a torture technique used by Saddam Hussein of dripping nitric acid randomly on prisoners. In August 2007 in San Francisco he recreated rooms of destroyed houses from Iraq, covered in ash, some from human remains.

== Selected works ==
- Sorrow of Baghdad (1999)
- Absinthe Drinker
- Raze 213 (1999)
- Mona Lisa (2002)
- A Bar at the Folies Begère (2003)
- Baiti "My Home" (2003)
- One Chair (2005)
- Midwest Olympia (2005)
- Human Condition (2005)
- Domestic Tension (2007)
- Shoot an Iraqi: Art, Life and Resistance Under the Gun (2008) ISBN 978-0-87286-491-7.
- Virtual Jihadi (2008)
- ... and Counting (2010)
- 3rdi (2010–11)
- Technoviking (2013)
- The Ashes Series (2003-2013)
- 168:01 (2015-2016)

== See also ==
- Iraqi art
- Islamic art
- List of Iraqi artists
