= Amlar =

- Village
- Location within Jammu and Kashmir Location within India
- Coordinates: 33.888°N 75.070°E
- Country: India
- Union Territory: Jammu and Kashmir
- District: Pulwama

Languages
  - Official: Kashmiri, Urdu, Hindi, Dogri, English
- Time zone: UTC+5:30 (IST)
- PIN: 192123

Amlar is a village in the Pulwama district of the Indian union territory of Jammu and Kashmir. It lies at a distance of almost 35 km from Srinagar and 6 km from main Tral town and 5 km from Awantipora. Its nearby villages are Nowpora, Lariyar, and Poshwan. On the Khandaypora (mohalla of Amlar) side, it is surrounded by a low mountain (Wudur).

== See also ==
- Jammu and Kashmir
- Awantipora
- Pulwama
