= Naved Ahmed =

Naved Ahmed may refer to:

- Naved Ahmed (cricketer, born 1971), Pakistani cricketer for Islamabad
- Naved Ahmed (cricketer, born 1978), Pakistani cricketer for Lahore Whites
- Naved Ahmed (cricketer, born 1986), Indian cricketer for Bengal
