= A. K. M. Rezaul Mazid =

Bangladeshi general

Abul Kashem Mohammad Rezaul Mazid
- Education: Bangladesh Military Academy
- Military career
- Allegiance: Bangladesh
- Branch: Bangladesh Army
- Service years: 1991 – 2025
- Rank: Major General
- Service number: BA - 4006
- Unit: Corps of Engineers
- Commands: Chief Consultant of Padma Multipurpose Bridge Project; Commander of 14th Independent Engineers Brigade; Commander of 34th Engineers Construction Brigade
- Awards: Bishishto Seba Padak (BSP)

Abul Kashem Mohammad Rezaul Mazid (Note: BSP, ndc, afwc, psc) is a retired two-star officer of the Bangladesh Army and former chief consultant general on the Padma Multipurpose Bridge. Mazid was the prime coordinator in the amelioration of the Cox's Bazar–Teknaf Marine Drive while serving as the commander of the 34th Engineers Construction Brigade.

== Career ==
Mazid is an army engineer who served as director of the Directorate of Works and chief engineer (army) in Army Headquarters in Military Engineers' Services until 2022. Earlier, he was commander of the Bangladesh Army's 34 Engineer Construction Brigade. He was project director of the country's first six-lane flyover at Mohipal in Feni. In November 2022, he became CCG, replacing Major General F M Zahid Hossain.
