= Baragam =

Baragam Baragram
- Village
- Location in Jammu and Kashmir, India Baragam (India)
- Coordinates: 33°53′28.2″N 75°03′26.9″E
- Country: India
- Union territory: Jammu and Kashmir
- District: Pulwama
- Elevation: 1,598 m (5,243 ft)

Languages
  - Official: Kashmiri, Urdu, Hindi, Dogri, English
- Time zone: UTC+5:30 (IST)
- PIN: 192123
- Telephone code: 01933
- Tehsil: Tral
- Post Office: Tral

Baragam, also known as Baragram, is a village in the Tral block of Pulwama district in the Indian union territory of Jammu and Kashmir. It is a small village located at 33°53′28.2″N 75°03′26.9″E. It lies almost 35 km (22 mi) from Srinagar, and 17 km (11 mi) from district headquarters, Pulwama .

The PIN code of Baragam is 192123 and its postal head office is Tral. Awantipora (5 km), Tral (7 km), Pulwama(30 km), Anantnag (35 km), Srinagar (35 km) are the nearby Villages and cities to Baragam. Baragam is surrounded by Dachnipora block towards South, Koviripora block towards North, Kakapora block towards west and Pulwama block towards west.

== Occupation ==
Agriculture is the main source of income of the people of Baragam. Besides this people are engaged in other economic activities mainly Walnut business.

== Climate ==
During summers it is quite warm and maximum temperatures may go up to 32 °C (90 °F), and during winters, it is shivering cold with temperatures generally remaining below freezing point. The village receives good amount of precipitation in the form of rains during summers and snow during winters.

== Baragam 2011 Census Details ==
Baragam Local Language is Kashmiri. Baragam Village Total population is about 1,100 and number of houses are near about 200. Female population is 47.8%. Village literacy rate is 62.1% and the Female literacy rate is 45.8%
