= Quest for Saddam =

2003 video game

- Developer: Petrilla Entertainment
- Publisher: Petrilla Entertainment
- Engine: Torque Game Engine
- Platform: Windows
- Release: May 14, 2003
- Genre: First-person shooter
- Mode: Single player

Quest for Saddam is a first-person shooter video game released by Petrilla Entertainment on May 14, 2003. With a gameplay style similar to Doom and a humorous approach to the plot, the goal is to fight Iraqi soldiers and eventually to kill Saddam Hussein. The game was later modded by the Global Islamic Media Front (an al-Qaeda propaganda organization) in Quest for Bush, which changed the game's premise to kill the game's boss, President George W. Bush.

== See also ==
- Quest for Bush
