= Sabzar Bhat =

Hizbul Mujahideen commander

- Died: 26 May 2017
- Military career
- Allegiance: Hizbul Mujahideen
- Rank: Commander
- Conflicts: Kashmir conflict: Insurgency in Jammu and Kashmir

Sabzar Ahmed Bhat was a Kashmiri militant, who was the area commander of the militant organisation Hizbul Mujahideen. He was killed in an encounter by the police on 26 May 2017 at Tral.

== Early life ==
Bhat's home village is reported to have been in Rathsuna, Tral, Jammu and Kashmir. He only finished half of his schooling, dropping out after failing his Class X examinations, and previously worked in the orchards and fields of his father.

== Hizbul Mujahideen ==
He reportedly joined militant organisation Hizbul Mujahideen in April 2015, after stealing a rifle from a CRPF soldier in Tral. Bhat is reported to have been involved in attacks on panchayat members and security forces, as well as the execution of civilians he believed to be informants. In October 2015, he was arrested for transporting two Lashkar-e-Taiba jihadists involved in the 2015 Udhampur Terrorist Attack. In that case, he was indicted on 29 January 2016.

Bhat was an aide and close friend to the previous Hizbul Mujahideen militant, Burhan Wani, who was commander and was killed in July 2016. Indian security forces considered him effective at using social media to recruit youth towards terrorism. Indian security forces previously located him in Rathsuna, in March 2017, but he was able to evade them after a 15-hour gunfight that left one policeman dead.

== Death ==
Bhat was killed in a firefight with Indian security forces in Soimoh, Tral, approximately forty kilometers outside of Srinagar. He was subsequently buried in Pulwama. His death sparked clashes and a police-imposed curfew, during which a youth was killed in clashes with the Central Reserve Police Force. Internet and phone service across Kashmir was suspended in an attempt to calm the region.

A previously unknown militant group, Mujahideen Taliban-e-Kashmir, claimed it had provided information on Bhat to security forces. The claim remains unverified, though some analysts suggested it reflected a growing schism between various terrorist groups in Kashmir, with members of Hizbul Mujahideen concerned that Zakir Musa may have betrayed Bhat.

=== Diplomatic protest ===
Pakistan's Adviser to the Prime Minister on Foreign Affairs Sartaj Aziz claimed that the killing of Bhat was an extrajudicial execution, and called on the United Nations and the Organisation of Islamic Conference to investigate.
