= Quest for Bush =

2006 video game

- Screenshot from Quest for Bush
- Developer: Global Islamic Media Front
- Publisher: Global Islamic Media Front
- Engine: Torque Game Engine
- Platform: Microsoft Windows
- Release: September 11, 2006
- Genre: First-person shooter
- Mode: Single player

Quest for Bush, also known by its literal Arabic translation The Night of Bush Capturing, is a free first-person shooter video game released by the Global Islamic Media Front (an al-Qaeda propaganda organization) in September 2006. The goal is to fight U.S. soldiers with an AK-47 through six levels and eventually to kill the boss, then-President George W. Bush, all while a nasheed plays in the background. The game is a modification of Quest for Saddam, released by Petrilla Entertainment in 2003.
