= Riyaz Naikoo =

Hizbul Mujahideen commander

Commander of Hizbul Mujahideen
- In office 2017–2020
- Preceded by: Zakir Musa
- Succeeded by: Gazi Haider

Personal details
- Born: April 1985 Beighpora, Jammu & Kashmir, India
- Died: 6 May 2020 (aged 35) Beighpora, Jammu & Kashmir, India
- Cause of death: Encounter
- Resting place: Sonamarg
- Citizenship: India
- Education: Msc Physics

Military service
- Allegiance: Hizbul Mujahideen (2012–2020)
- Activity years: 2010–2020
- Rank: Commander in chief
- Battles/wars: Kashmir conflict: Insurgency in Jammu and Kashmir; 2010 Kashmir unrest

Riyaz Ahmad Naikoo (also known as Mohammad bin Qasim or Zubair ul Islam, April 1985 – 6 May 2020) was one of the top ten most wanted Islamic terrorist of Jammu and Kashmir. He was the operational chief of Hizbul Mujahideen and was the organization's longest serving field commander.

== Early life and militant activities ==
=== Early life ===
Naikoo was born in Beighpora, a village in Awantipora tehsil of the Pulwama district in the Kashmir Valley of Jammu and Kashmir, India in April 1985 into a Muslim family. Some of his relatives have said that he had a passion for painting, especially roses, during his school and college days. After earning a degree in mathematics he became a math teacher at a nearby school. He gave free tuition to children from economically weaker backgrounds.

=== Teaching to militancy career ===
His career transition from teacher to militancy came during the 2010 Kashmir unrest when he was detained by the Indian security forces for his alleged support to separatist protesters demanding Indian forces to "quit Kashmir" later he was released in 2012 after his release in the third week of May 2012 he left his home and disappeared then on 1 June 2012 he resurfaced with a gun and become a militant of Hizb-ul-Mujahideen. In 2017 he became the commander (de facto chief) of Hizb-ul-Mujahideen in Jammu and Kashmir after the death of Burhan Wani and the defection of Zakir Rashid Bhat.

In March 2014, he was alleged to be involved in the killing of a Sarpanch's father, Haji Ghulam Mohammed Dar in Dogripora. He was also wanted for killing and abduction of police officers, firing on a police bus and requirement in other crimes.

In 2018, police detained Naikoo's 70-year-old father. In retaliation, family members of police were kidnapped by militants from across south Kashmir. His father was soon released and the 11 hostages were accordingly let go by Naikoo. Jammu and Kashmir Police had alleged that he would loot orchard owners. Naikoo started the practice of offering gun salutes to militants killed in encounters and posting them on social media. He was responsible for recruiting "scores of young Kashmiris in an armed quest for independence from India". Police say he rarely used mobiles, used a VPN when he had to, and was known to have used the Bat Messenger app to communicate. Naikoo's videos were circulated on the social media; one such video after the revocation of the special status of Jammu and Kashmir showed him saying that the revocation was "irrelevant to us" and the fight would continue. Naikoo carried a bounty of ₹12 lakh on his head.

Naikoo's last audio message in April was related to the COVID-19 pandemic where he requested people to follow medical advice to keep themselves protected.

== Encounter ==
Naikoo was killed in an encounter with 55 Rashtriya Rifles and Jammu and Kashmir Police on 6 May 2020 in Beighpora. He was with an associate, who was also killed. The encounter was viewed as a victory for the security forces. Naikoo had been among the top 10 on the most-wanted list in Kashmir. As per policy, Naikoo's body was not handed back to his family. He was one of Kashmir's longest surviving militants (May 2012 to May 2020 or for 8 years).

As a precautionary measure to curb the spread of news, government authorities information imposed communications and information blackouts by barring internet and mobile services across Kashmir Valley right after Naikoo's encounter. Protests against the killing of Naikoo were the first since August 2019, when the revocation of Kashmir's special status took place, with at least one protester dying and 50 seriously injured with bullet wounds to the chest and some with pellet injuries in one or both eyes. Syed Salahuddin, the head of Hizb-ul-Mujahideen, who is designated as a terrorist by India and the United States, said that "the sacrifice would help them achieve the mission that they had set out to achieve". On 10 May 2020 Saifullah, also known as Gazi Haider, replaced Riyaz Naikoo as the new operations commander.

== See also ==
- Insurgency in Jammu and Kashmir
- Hamid Gada
- Zakir Rashid Bhat
