= Karuo culture =

Neolithic culture in Tibet

Coordinates: 31.058°N 97.209°E

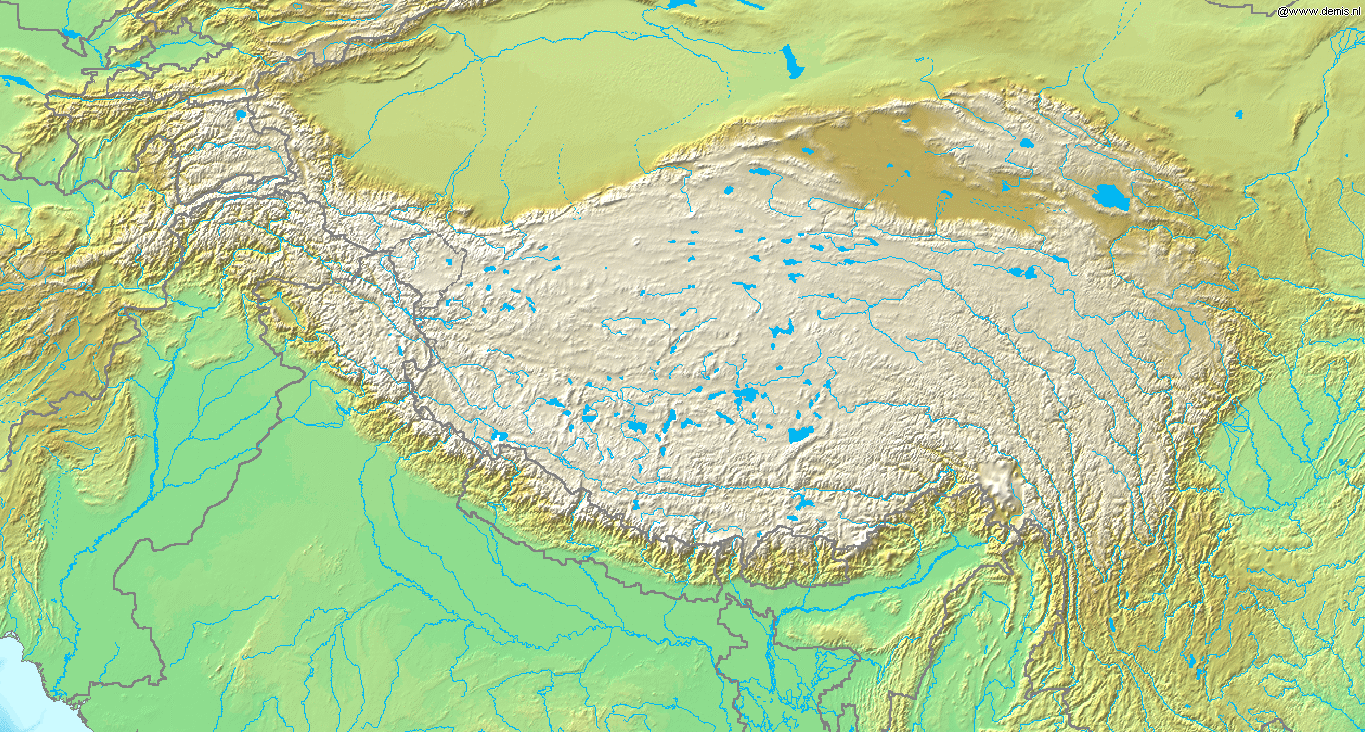
- Geographical range: Eastern Tibetan Plateau
- Period: Bronze Age
- Dates: c. 3300 BC – 2000 BC
- Type site: Karuo

The Karuo culture (3300 to 2000 BC) was a Neolithic culture in Tibet. The culture cultivated foxtail millet.

== Karuo type site ==
The type site at Karuo (卡若, Tibetan Kha.rub ཁ་ རུབ, although Mkhar ro has also been used) was discovered in 1977 at Chamdo County, Chamdo Prefecture, Tibet and excavated from 1978 to 1979. Located at about 3,100 m (10,171 ft) above sea level, the site covered an area of 10,000 m^{2}. Over 7,000 artifacts have been discovered at Karuo, including 1,060 stone artifacts, 1,284 pottery shards and 4,755 bone objects. It is one of only a few archaeological sites on the Tibetan Plateau dating back so far, and it is in good enough condition for the foundations of houses to still be found, along with roads, walls, and stone altars in addition to the individual artifacts.

Appearance-wise, the pottery at Karuo shows many similarities with pottery found at Majiayao sites, primarily the later phases, Machang and Banshan; however, the Karuo pottery was made using different methods and appears to be merely imitative. The tool assemblage at Karuo also shows similarities with those found at sites in western Sichuan.

The remains of 34 houses were found at the site. During the earlier stages, the houses at Karuo were round and semi-subterranean. During the later stages, the houses at Karuo were rectangular and subterranean. The later houses were more solidly built and represents a shift to more permanent habitation at Karuo.

Karuo is the site of the oldest permanent settlement in Tibet and represents the earliest evidence for agriculture on the Tibetan Plateau. Agriculturally, the people at Karuo relied primarily on foxtail millet, while some evidence for broomcorn millet was also discovered. The oldest evidence for foxtail millet at Karuo dates to around 3000 BC. Stone harvesting knives were used as harvesting implements. The people of Karuo also supplemented their diet with hunting.

The residents of Karuo suddenly abandoned the settlement around 1750 BC. This is likely due to a change in climate, as Karuo likely required optimal conditions (higher temperatures) for foxtail millet to be grown successfully; Karuo coincided with a period of warmer temperatures in the region, and a return to cooler temperatures likely made foxtail millet cultivation at the site untenable. Broomcorn millet requires even higher temperatures for cultivation, so the broomcorn millet found at Karuo must have been obtained from trade with lower elevation sites.
