= Stone harvesting knives =

Neolithic East Asian tool

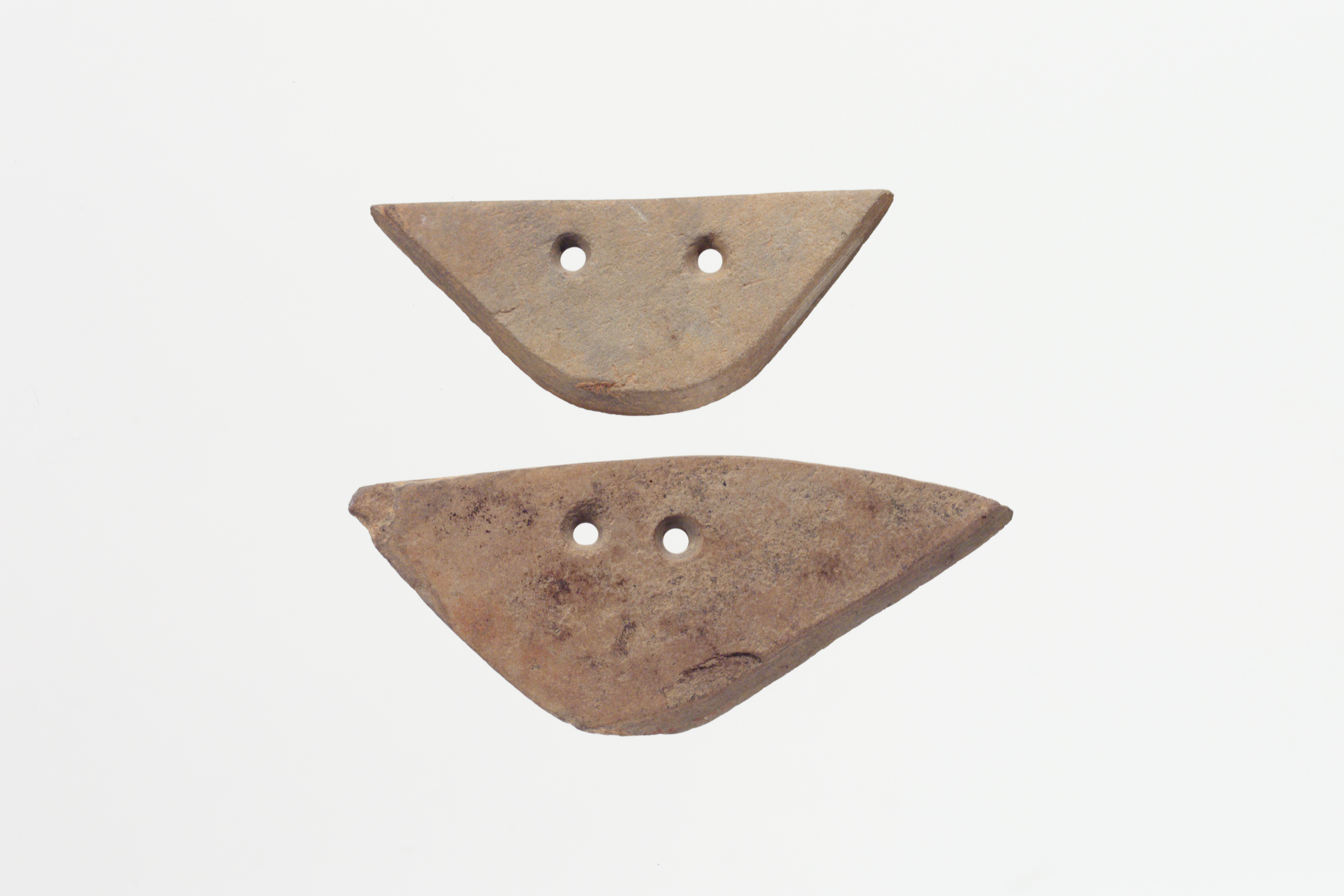
Triangular harvesting knives, Songgukri, first millennium BCE

Stone harvesting knives (Chinese: (xisheng) shidao (系绳)石刀, Korean: dol khal 돌칼, Japanese ishibōchō 石庖丁) are a very distinctive tool, which first appears during the Yangshao culture, around 4600 BCE, and remain in use the Han dynasty or even later in Taiwan. They first appear in the Yellow River Basin, associated with the cultivation of millets (Setaria italica and Panicum milliaceum), and eventually spread to a vast zone from Swat and Kashmir to the West, to Yunnan in the Southwest, Taiwan in the Southeast and Korea, Japan and Primorye in the Northeast.

These knives are distinguished from earlier stone knives found in the Peiligang culture by the presence of side notches or perforations, which are thought to have been used to attach cords, hence the name xisheng shidao 系绳石刀 cord-attached stone knives used by scholars such as Luo Erhu.

The earliest knives are rectangular in shape, notched knives being sometimes chipped rather than polished, but from the fourth millennium BCE on, other shape appear, including lunate (Chinese: 半月形石刀, Korean: 반달돌칼, with straight or curved blade), bay (with curved handle and blade) and triangular.

Ceramic harvesting knives made of reworked pottery are also found alongside stone knives in the early Yangshao period, but gradually become less frequent (without disappearing altogether) and never extend as far as stone knives.

Stone harvesting knives remain associated with millet agriculture until they reach the Lower Yangtze river region in sites such as Pishan 毘山 (Late Songze--early Liangzhu, ca. 3500-3100 BCE), where they start being associated with the harvesting of rice exclusively.

In Korea, millet agriculture spreads first without harvesting knives in the Chulmun culture, while stone harvesting knives appear together with rice agriculture in the Mumun culture.

In Japan, harvesting knives arrive together with rice and millets with the Yayoi culture, in the early first millennium BCE.

From the Han dynasty, stone harvesting knives are gradually replaced by metal harvesting knives (Chinese: 銍), which have remained in use until the XXth century.

== Harvesting knives and the spread of the Sino-Tibetan family ==
Harvesting knives along with millets have been seen as possible archaeological correlate of demic diffusion of the speakers of several language families, in particular Sino-Tibetan.. They arrive in Kashmir and Swat by 2000-1700 BC, in sites such as Gufkral and Burzahom, which are located a mere 100 km from the area where the westernmost West Himalayish Pattani language is spoken.

== Sources ==
- Jacques, Guillaume; Stevens, Chris (2024), "Linguistic, archaeological and genetic evidence suggests multiple agriculture-driven migrations of Sino-Tibetan speakers from Northern China to the Indian subcontinent", Quaternary International, 711 (30): 1–20, Bibcode:2024QuInt.711....1J, doi:10.1016/j.quaint.2024.09.001
- Jacques, Guillaume; Stevens, Chris; Kan, Yu-Chun; Fuller, Dorian (2026), "Harvesting knives in Neolithic East Asia", Quaternary International, 781 110418, doi:10.1016/j.quaint.2026.110418
