= Lariyar =

- Village
- Location in Jammu and Kashmir, India Lariyar (India)
- Coordinates: 33.893128°N 75.087040°E
- Country: India
- State: Jammu and Kashmir
- District: Pulwma
- Subdistrict: Tral

Population (2011)
  - Total: 1,167

Languages
  - Official: Kashmiri, Hindi, Urdu, Dogri, English

Lariyar is a small village in Tral area of Pulwama district in Jammu and Kashmir, India. The population was 1,167 at the 2011 Indian census.
