= Abu Qasim (militant) =

Lashkar-e-Taiba commander (d. 2015)

- Died: 29 October 2015; Kulgam, Jammu and Kashmir, India
- Other name: Abdul Rahman
- Military career
- Allegiance: Lashkar-e-Taiba
- Rank: Commander

Abu Qasim, also known as Abdul Rahman (died on 29 October 2015) was a Lashkar-e-Taiba commander and Pakistani national, who was the mastermind behind the 2015 Udhampur terrorist attack. He was killed on 29 October 2015 in the Kulgam area of Kashmir, in a joint operation by Jammu and Kashmir Police and the Indian Army. He had been active in the Kashmir Valley since 2009 and carried a cash reward of INR 20 lakh ₹2,000,000 (US$21,000) on his head.

Qasim was a resident of Multan, Pakistan. He was head of the Lashkar-e-Taiba's operations in Kashmir, its senior most Commander and top strategist, and the main recruiter, as reported by Indian Express.

== See also ==
- Lashkar-e-Taiba
- 2015 Udhampur terrorist attack
