= F. M. Zahid Hossain =

F M Zahid Hossain
- Military career
- Allegiance: Bangladesh
- Branch: Bangladesh Army
- Service years: 1986 – 2022
- Rank: Major General
- Unit: Corps of Engineers
- Commands: Construction Consultant General and Director of Padma Multipurpose Bridge; Commandant of Engineers Centre and School of Military Engineering; Commander of 24th Engineers Construction Brigade
- Awards: Senabahini Padak (SBP)

F M Zahid Hossain, SBP, afwc, psc is a retired major general in the Bangladesh Army who was the chief consultant general of construction supervision of the Bangladesh Army and chief coordinator for security and safety of the Padma Multipurpose Bridge.

== Early life ==
Hossain passed SSC and HSC from Jhenidah Cadet College in 1982 and 1984, respectively. He completed his Bachelor of Science degree at the University of Chittagong. He has a Bachelor of Engineering degree and a Master of Engineering degree from Bangladesh University of Engineering and Technology. He has a master's degree in defense studies from the National University of Bangladesh. He has an executive MBA from the American International University-Bangladesh.

== Career ==
He served at the Directorate of Works and Chief Engineer (Army) in Army Headquarters while he was a lieutenant colonel. Hossain also served at the Military Institute of Science and Technology from September 2011 to October 2012 as a senior instructor. He worked at the Engineering Center and School of Military Engineering.

From 21 December 2014 to 2 September 2015, Hossain was the head of the Faculty of Civil Engineering at the Military Institute of Science and Technology.

In July 2021, Hossain distributed relief material in Zajira Upazila, Shariatpur District, during the COVID-19 pandemic in Bangladesh.
