= Tral =

- Town
- Interactive map of Tral
- Location in Jammu and Kashmir, India Tral (India)
- Coordinates: 33.93°N 75.1°E
- Country: India
- Union territory: Jammu and Kashmir
- District: Pulwama
- Elevation: 1,662 m (5,453 ft)

Population (2011)
  - Total: 120,196

Languages
  - Official: Kashmiri, Urdu, English
  - Spoken: Kashmiri
- Time zone: UTC+5:30 (IST)
- PIN: 192123
- Telephone code: 01933
- Literacy: 64%
- Website: www.pulwama.gov.in

Tral is a town, sub-district, and a notified area committee in the Pulwama district in Jammu and kashmir (Union Territory) of India. The town is situated at a distance of 40 kilometres (25 mi) from the summer capital, Srinagar and 26 kilometres (16 mi) from district headquarters, Pulwama. Tral is the second largest municipal area committee in Pulwama district.

== History ==
Gufkral represents an important site in the area. Gufkral is located at Banmir village in Hurdumir area of Tral, five km (3.1 mi) from the sub-district headquarters. The area falls between two nallahs (streams) on an extensive deposit of Karewa (elevated tableland) where people used to live in ancient times.

According to historical accounts, Shah-e-Hamdan gifted a Lal-e-Badakshan (a ruby from Badakhshan) to Sultan Sikandar; in return, Sultan Sikandar granted Shah-e-Hamdan land on which to build khanqahs at Tral, Sopore, and Wachi.

== Geography ==
Tral is located at 33.93°N 75.1°E. The average elevation is 1,662 metres (5,453 ft) and its average area is 110 km^{2} (42 sq mi).

The main town area of Tral is divided into two parts/divisions – Upper Tral (Tral-i-Bala) and Lower Tral (Tral-i-Payeen). There is a significant difference in the altitudes of these two divisions/parts, as their name suggests. The population of Lower Tral (Tral-i-Payeen) is more than that of Upper Tral (Tral-i-Bala).

== Villages in Tral Tehsil ==
- Ali Gund
- Amirabad
- Amlar
- Arigam Ullar
- Aripal
- Baragam
- Batagund
- Brental
- Bathnoor Jagir
- Begh Gund
- Boochu
- Chandrigam
- Chatrugam
- Chewa Ullar
- Cheribugh
- Dadasara
- Dar Ganie Gund
- Deedarpora
- Dewar
- Dharamgund
- Doonigund
- Gameraj
- Gutroo
- Gulab Bagh
- Gulistan
- Gulshanpora
- Gwaang
- Hajinar
- Hurdumir
- Heewan
- Jawahirpora
- Khanagund (Midoora)
- Khasipora
- Kuchmulla
- Nader
- Lalgam
- Lalpora
- Laribal
- Lariyar
- Lurgam
- Lurow Jagir
- Machhama
- Mandoora
- Monghama
- Naher
- Nigeenpora
- Naibugh
- Nanner
- Nawdal
- Nazneenpora
- Nargistan
- Panner Jagir
- Panzoo
- Pethgam Gadpora
- Pinglish
- Pranigam
- Quil Shikargah
- Rathsuna
- Reshipora
- Syedabad
- Sangrama
- Seer Jagir
- Shahpora
- Sheerabad/Shairabad/Bulli/Boli
- Saimoh
- Satoora
- Takiya Gulab Bagh
- Wagad
- Kaarmulla
- Nagbal
- Machama

== Demographics ==
As of the 2011 Indian Census, Tral had a population of 1,10,196 with 57,536 males constituting 52.21% of the population and 52,660 females constituting 47.79% of the population. Out of 1,10,196, 17,844 is urban and 92,352 is rural population of Tral.

=== Religion ===
According to the 2011 census, Islam is practised by about 89.51% of the population, while 7.41% follow Sikhism and 2.48% follow Hinduism.

Religious Demographics of Tral
Religion	Urban	Rural	Total
Islam	15852	82780	98632
Sikhism	107	8058	8165
Hinduism	1817	920	2737
Other	68	594	662
TOTAL	17844	92352	110196

== Education ==
Tral has an average literacy rate of about 64%. There are various educational institutions in and around Tral town. Tral has two educational zones:- Zone Tral and Zone Lurgam, which consist of 201 government educational institutes and 33 private schools up to senior secondary level besides a degree college an Islamic College for females, namely Islamic Oriental College, and an Industrial Training Institute.

== Tourist attractions ==
Nagaberan (Upper Dachigam), Wasturwan (Syedabad), Gufkral, Shikargah, Panner Dam, Aripal Spring, Narastan, Hajan, and Dilnag are the main tourist attractions of Tral. Tarsar-Marsar lakes are also accessible via the meadows of Nagaberan.

=== Tral Wildlife Sanctuary ===
On 26 October 2019, the government declared a new breeding ground for endangered Kashmiri stag (Hangul) in Tral area. It was named as Tral Wildlife Sanctuary which is spread over 154.15 km^{2} (59.52 sq mi) and came into being by merging Paner-Shikargah forest area in Tral with Overa-Aru Wildlife Sanctuary in Pahalgam.

== Security situation ==
Tral is a volatile area and a traditional hotbed of militancy. Burhan Wani, former commander of Hizbul Mujahideen, hailed from Sharifabad, Tral. Hizbul Mujahideen commander Sabzar Bhat, successor of Burhan Wani, also hailed from Rathsuna Tral and was killed in Saimoh village (Tral) by Indian security forces, thus sparking days of unrest. Ansar Ghazwat-ul-Hind (Kashmir-based Al-Qaeda Cell) is also believed to be operating from Tral as its founder and chief, Zakir Musa, hailed from the Noorpora area of Tral.

== Notable people ==
Notable people living in or coming from the Tral area include:

- Ali Muhammad Naik – former MP, MLA, speaker of the Legislative Assembly.
- Maulana Noor Ahmad Trali – religious scholar.
