= Abu Dujana (militant) =

Lashkar-e-Taiba Commander

- ابو دجانة
- Born: Gilgit-Baltistan, Pakistan
- Died: 1 August 2017; Pulwama, Jammu and Kashmir, India
- Organization: Ansar Ghazwat-ul-Hind
- Known for: Attacks on security forces
- Allegiance: Lashkar-e-Taiba, al-Qaeda
- Reward amount: ₹1,500,000

Abu Dujana (died 1 August 2017) was an Ansar Ghazwat-ul-Hind militant, former Lashkar-e-Taiba commander and Pakistani national who was killed in a joint anti-militant operation in Pulwama, Jammu and Kashmir. Dujana was Lashkar-e-Taiba's chief commander for the Kashmir Valley. He was listed among the most-wanted in Jammu and Kashmir for several attacks on security forces. He was an A+++ category militant and carried a reward of ₹1,500,000 (US$16,000) on his head.

Abu Dujana was the mastermind behind several attacks in the south Kashmir, including one on a Central Reserve Police Force convoy at Pampore and another at the Entrepreneurship Development Institute of India in the Sempora area in 2016.

== See also ==
- Lashkar-e-Taiba
