= 2009 Shopian rape and murder hoax =

Rape and murder case in the Indian-administered territory of Jammu and Kashmir

- Shopian (India) Shopian (Jammu and Kashmir)
- Location: Bongam, Shopian, Jammu and Kashmir, India
- Date: 29 May 2009
- Attack type: rape and murder, later determined to have been accidental deaths
- Deaths: 2

In 2009, allegations began circulating about the abduction, rape and murder of two young women – Asiya Jan and Neelofar Jan – allegedly by the Central Reserve Police Force of India. Between 29 and 30 May 2009, at Bongam, Shopian district, Jammu and Kashmir, the two women (sisters-in-law) had gone missing from their orchard on the way home on 29 May 2009. The next morning, their bodies were found both one kilometer apart. Local police concluded the women appeared to have drowned in a stream, rejecting allegations that their deaths were homicides.

On 22 June 2023, the Jammu and Kashmir administration, invoking Article 311(2)(c) of the Constitution of India, terminated two doctors, Dr. Bilal Ahmad Dalal and Dr. Nighat Shaheen Chilloo, claiming the two were "actively working" with Pakistan-based groups and falsifying evidence in the case. According to officials, the Central Bureau of Investigation (CBI) found that the deaths of Asiya Jan and Neelofar Jan on 29 May 2009, were due to accidental drowning, not rape or murder. The doctors allegedly manipulated the post-mortem report to frame security forces, aiming to incite disaffection against the Indian state. The CBI charge-sheeted them and 11 other people in December 2009 for "misleading the investigations and fabricating evidence about rape and murder".

== Victims ==
Neelofar Jan, aged 22 and Asiya Jan, aged 17, were sisters-in-law and resided in Bongam, Shopian. Neelofar Jan was married to Shakeel Ahmed Ahangar and the couple had a two-year-old son. Asiya Jan was the daughter of Abdul Gani Ahangar.

== Initial stages of investigations ==
Local villagers stated that the two women were raped and the murdered by members of security forces. A protest called by Syed Ali Shah Geelani of the Hurriyat called for a shutdown of business, but later turned violent, as a consequence of which the administration declared a curfew.

A press release by the police on 30 May stated that "Post-mortem conducted revealed no marks on the dead bodies including private parts." No FIR was registered for either rape or murder and the government of Jammu and Kashmir ordered for a judicial probe to be led by retired Justice Muzaffar Jan into the incident due to people's lack of faith in police investigations. Concerns arose after the doctor who conducted the post-mortem admitted to the Central Bureau of Investigation that the vaginal swabs that she had submitted to them for testing were fabricated from discarded lab items, and that she had not taken any swabs from the victims. Later, testing by the Central Forensic Laboratory proved that the samples submitted after post-mortem did not match the victims.

On 7 June 2009, Jammu and Kashmir police filed FIR of rape and murder following widespread protests across the state.

== Case history ==
On 31 May 2009, the Chief Minister of Jammu and Kashmir, Omar Abdullah, appointed retired Justice Muzaffar Jan to carry out the probe and complete the inquiry in one month's time. The Superintendent of Police, Dr Haseeb Mughal, and The Chief Prosecuting Officer, Abdul Majid Dar, were to assist in the probe, headed by Justice (retired) Muzaffar Jan. The report would be subsequently tabled in the state assembly to make it public. The notification issued in this regard by the Home Department said that the Commission shall:

- ascertain whether there had been any foul play in their death and, if so, identify the person/persons responsible.
- perform all other functions necessary for holding of inquiry and submit its report within one month from the date of the notification.
- ascertain whether there was any failure on the part of any government department in the conduct of any investigation or handling of the post-incident situation.
- The Commission, appointed in exercise of powers conferred by Section 3 of the J&K Commission of Inquiry Act, shall recommend action as deemed necessary against the person/persons involved/responsible and suggest action as may be necessary to ensure non-repetition of such incidents.

The government has further directed that the provisions of sub-section 2, 3, 4, 5 and 6 of Section 5 of Commission of Inquiry Act shall be applicable to the Commission.

=== Outcome of Justice Jan commission ===
The final report filed by Justice Jan Commission is summarised in seven parts.

- "Part 1" (PDF). hindu.com. Archived from the original (PDF) on 27 July 2013.
- "Part 2" (PDF). hindu.com. Archived from the original (PDF) on 27 July 2013.
- "Part 3" (PDF). hindu.com. Archived from the original (PDF) on 27 July 2013.
- "Part 4" (PDF). hindu.com. Archived from the original (PDF) on 27 July 2013.
- "Part 5" (PDF). hindu.com. Archived from the original (PDF) on 27 July 2013.
- "Part 6" (PDF). hindu.com. Archived from the original (PDF) on 27 July 2013.
- "Part 7" (PDF). hindu.com. Archived from the original (PDF) on 27 July 2013.

=== Role of the Press ===
Justice Jan Commission also concluded that a lot of incorrect reporting from the press was noted in regard to the case. It recommended that firm guidelines should be made to ensure authentic news is published in such cases, to prevent law and order problems. Commission observed multiple instances of incorrect reporting by the press under the section 'Press Recommendation'. For instance, it was widely put out that the girls have been gangraped, but no evidence of it was found by the medical experts. Similarly, it was reported that their clothes were found to be torn, which was also found to be untrue by the Commission. Most importantly, media publicised a 'last phone call' of Neelofer to her husband, and it was presented that she told him that she was being chased by CRPF persons near the river. However, Neelofer's husband (Shakeel), her brother (Syed) and her cousin sister (Posha), all gave their statement to the Commission, on oath, that neither did she own a mobile phone nor did she call alleging such chase by any CRPF persons.

=== Timeline of probe and police findings and fact-finding committee ===
Date	Details
6 June 2009	Justice (retired) Muzaffar Jan established his office in Circuit House Shopian and started its functioning. The Shopian Bar Association formed a six-member ‘fact finding committee’ which included Advocate S M Iqbal, Advocate Ajaz Hussain, Advocate Ghulam Hassan Dar, Advocate Sheikh Mubarak and Advocate A M Mir and headed by Advocate M.Y. Bhat. The Forensic Science Lab report confirmed gang rape of the duo. Reports were presented to the authorities on Sunday, 7 June 2009.
7 June 2009	Police registered a case under section 376 of Indian Penal Code after Forensic Sciences Laboratory (FSL) report confirming rape on two women. The case was registered under FIR no 112/2009 in Police Station Shopian.
8 June 2009	The director general of police, Kuldeep Khoda, ordered that a three-member special investigation team consisting of Shah-Din Malik (SP commandant IRP 5th battalion as Incharge), Mushtaq Ahmad Shah (deputy superintendent of police, Awantipora) and Najeeb Hussain Nahvi (senior prosecuting officer of Crime Branch Kashmir) expeditiously investigate the matter. The three-man team would investigate the case under the supervision of DIG South Kashmir Range. Commission ordered police to handover a complete report about the duty schedule and leave schedule of the policemen stationed in various pickets around the place wherefrom the two women disappeared on 29 May besides commission along with his team also visited both the spots from where police recovered the bodies.
9 June 2009	CoI summoned all the doctors of both teams which had conducted post-mortems of the victims and recorded their statements in detail. Health officials submitted their report to DGP. Reports ruled out death of the victims due to drowning or consuming poison. The report said unmarried girl Asiya died due to violent sexual assaults. The assaults were so violent that she sustained severe multiple injuries, resulting in bleeding of various body parts and subsequent death while Neelofar died of neurogenic shock.
10 June 2009	Police filed FIR against murder of the duo under 302 Ranbir Penal Code.
12 June 2009	Former SP Javed Iqbal Mattoo admitted his failure of duties in front of the commission led by retired Justice Muzaffar Jan, who seized his SIM card. The SP said received a call from Station House Officer at 5:30 am on 30 May 2009 for recovery of body of Neelofar Jan and instead of reaching the crime site, he was busy exercising at his residence and to add on, he didn't appoint any guards to the crime site for recovery of any evidence or links to culprits. He further mentioned that there were distinct marks of violence and injuries on the bodies of victims but still no FIR was filed against it.
13 June 2009	The inquiry commission led by Muzaffar Jan questioned and recorded statements of the Deputy Inspector General, Rakesh Kumar, former Deputy Commissioner, M R Thakur and Dr Bilquees (a lady doctor), who assisted first post-mortem.
14 June 2009	The commission with Muzaffar Jan as its head, questioned The Head of the Forensic Medicine Department (Dr. Fareeda Noor), the Head of the Legal Cell of the Forensic Medicine department (Javed Iqbal Hafiz), along with Shakeel Ahmad, Mushtaq Ahmad, and Suhail Ahmad. The commission accused Hafiz of delay in sending the FSL report of victims to Shopian police. He had received the report on 2 June 2009 but kept it undisclosed for five days. The commission further mentioned FSL report, which confirms rape, as UNSETTLED and INDEFINITE to prove the cause death of the victims. Dr Noor mentioned that the cause of death could have been easily identified had samples from vital organs like heart, spleen, brain been obtained at the time of post-mortem. Hence, commission might order exhumation of the victims' bodies to establish justified cause of death of the duo.
17 June 2009	The Commission of Enquiry and Special Investigating Team questioned four Special Operations Group's officials and asked a woman police officer and an expert from forensic medicine from Srinagar to assist them in further progress.
21 June 2009	The inquiry commission led by Muzaffar Jan submitted a 300-page interim report to Chief Minister Of Jammu and Kashmir Omar Abdullah confirming rape and murder of the two victims. The report further stated negligence of civil administration, police and doctors in mishandling the case leading to destruction of vital evidence related to the case.
22 June 2009	The government, on basis of Interim Report of Commission Of Inquiry, suspended the former Superintendent of Police (Javaid Iqbal Mattoo), the Deputy Superintendent of Police (Rohit Baskotra), the former Station House Officer (Inspector Shafiq Ahmad), the Sub-Inspector (Gazi Abdul Karim) and the Legal Cell Head, Forensic Science Laboratory (Javaid Iqbal Hafiz) for alleged negligence in handling the incident.
23 June 2009	The Jammu and Kashmir High Court Bar Association, which was probing the matter independently, submitted its report to the High Court and a hearing for same was announced on 29 June 2009 by the court.
25 June 2009	Dr. Bilal Ahmad Dalal and Dr. Nighat Shaheen Chilloo were placed under suspension failure to follow due procedure during autopsy; the latter claimed she had only been called in as an expert to conduct the gynecological examination on the victims while she was suspended for negligence in conducting the autopsy, which she was never asked to do. She alleged she was being victimized for telling the truth.
30 June 2009	Deadline for submission of final inquiry report extended for another 10 days on the request of Commission. Report to be submitted on 10 July. Special Investigation Team (SIT) of police submitted the status report along with its objections over two petitions before Chief Judicial Magistrate Shopian for the two separate petitions related to the case. One petition was filed by Shakeel Ahmad, the brother of Asiya and husband of Neelofar, in which he had prayed that the four police officers of FSL indicted by the Jan Commission and later placed under suspension by the government for destroying evidence be made accused in the rape and murder case. The court had asked the government to file objections by 30 June. In another petition filed by the Shopian Bar Association, CJM was urged to monitor the investigations and ask the SIT to present the status report and case dairy in the court. The petition had also sought brain mapping of those whose names the SIT after investigation had involved in the case. Bar Association in its petition wanted registration of a murder case, presenting of a report of investigations into court, appointing of a special investigation by the court and monitoring of investigations by the court. It had also urged the High Court that directions be given to the state government not to allow police, SOG, CRPF and army personnel in Shopian to move out of station from their camps while the investigations were in progress.
12 August 2009	Allegations of tampering with DNA test reports in the Shopian case rocked the Jammu and Kashmir Assembly with opposition and ruling party members insisting on a debate on the issue, leading to suspension of the question hour.

== Rejection of probe ==
The High Court Bar Association, on 1 June 2009, rejected the probe ordered by the government demanding a sitting Judge of High Court or Chief Justice to carry out the probe instead of a retired Justice, Muzaffar Jan, while separatist leader Syed Ali Shah Geelani demanded Amnesty International probe the incident and also urged the High Court Bar Association probe the matter at their own level so the people would learn the truth. However, the Advocate General of Jammu and Kashmir, Muhammad Ishaq Qadri, commented that the Commission of Inquiry headed by a sitting or a retired judge does not make any difference regarding the legality of its findings, which are recommendatory in nature in both the cases. Unionist leader of the opposition in the assembly and the PDP president, Mahbooba Mufti, also rejected the government's inquiry commission into the case, and called upon the prime minister, Dr. Manmohan Singh, to review the performance of the state's ruling coalition personally as according to her, it had failed to extent of not registering an FIR of rape and murder in the case.

== Protests, arrests and curfew ==
As soon as the news about the incident spread in the Kashmir Valley, pre-mediated protests started. These protests were followed by the strike call by the secessionist leaders. Demands for justice, self-determination and removal of the Indian forces started, as planned. As soon as the protests started, police and Indian armed forces in order to halt the protests tried to control them peacefully and fired tear gas canisters as a last resort. Many separatist leaders were put under house arrest or jailed. The CBI probe resulted in exhuming the bodies for examination and it was found that Asiya's hymen was intact, thereby ruling out rape.

Date	Details
30 May 2009	As soon as the news about the incident spread in the area, the entire area was rocked by spontaneous protests. Hundreds of people, including a large number of women, took to streets shouting anti-India and pro-separatist slogans. Police used tear gas and batons to disperse them, who retaliated by pelting stones.
31 May 2009	Heavy protest was seen throughout Jammu and Kashmir. Police lobbed scores of tear gas shells and cane charged to quell the protesters injuring more than 40 protesters.
1 June 2009	Hurriyat Conference (G), chairman, Syed Ali Geelani called for a strike and peaceful protests over the incident. A complete shutdown was observed throughout Jammu and Kashmir with all government offices, shops, schools, banks remained closed. Protests were observed in Anantnag, Baramulla, Budgam, Bandipora, Kupwara, Ganderbal, Pulwama, Shopian, and Kulgam. Protesters resorted to stone pelting after police and paramilitary troops fired tear gas shells to disperse the crowd, injuring more than two dozen people. In Shopian, the home of a local legislator was damaged by mobs. Hurriyat Conference (G), chairman, Syed Ali Geelani renewed the strike call for next two days.
2 June 2009	A complete shutdown and protest was seen throughout Jammu and Kashmir in response to the Hurriyat chairman, Syed Ali Geelani's extended strike call.
4 June 2009	The complete valley was shut down with heavy protest against the incident. In Srinagar, 80 people including 8 policemen were injured. The S.P. of Police, city South, Irshad Ahmed and four policemen were injured and a CRPF bunker belonging to 157 Battalion was set on fire when group of youths pelted stone on the police party in Batmaloo, Srinagar. Protests also marred polling in Hazratbal Assembly Constituency.
5 June 2009	Shops, businesses, schools, government offices and banks remained closed across the Kashmir for fifth consecutive day in response to strike call by separatists to protest alleged rape and murder of two women from Shopian. The Hurriyat Conference(G) chairman, Syed Ali Geelani, renewed the strike through Sunday, when a comprehensive programme would be delivered for further action. He was authorised by the Majlis Shoura, the highest decision-making body of the amalgam.
7 June 2009	The seventh day of continued shutdown and protest throughout Kashmir Valley leading to injuries sustained by 40 civilians and 6 police officers.
8 June 2009	The 8-day-long shutdown in entire Kashmir valley was revamped but strict protests were observed throughout. The Hurriyat Conference (G) asked male students, female students, and employees to hold peaceful protests within their campuses on Tuesday, Wednesday and Thursday, respectively, followed by PHULWAMA MARCH on Friday. The Shopian district saw heavy injuries caused by police and CRPF troops against peaceful protests. Five men (Zahoor Ahmad, Ashiq Ahmad Ganai, Shawkar Ahmad, Jalal-ud-din Bhat, and Fazlul Mateen) were critically injured as police broke out firing at Sofan Namam of Shopian district. Four men (Javed Ahmad Bhat, Imtiaz Ahmad Bhat, Shakeel Ahmad Ganai and Shahnawaz Ahmad) were severely injured in tear smoke shelling at Rang Kadal in Shopian. Riyaz Ahmad, sustained heavy injuries due to beating by troopers.
19 June 2009	The Varmul March of the Hurriyat Conference (G) was crushed by police and paramilitary forces by sealing all the roads to Varmul under a curfew-like situation. A complete shutdown was seen throughout Kashmir.
20 June 2009	The strike was observed with complete shutdown of the valley as per the Hurriyat Conference (G)'s call. Shops, banks, government offices, business, school were all closed with no public transport on the roads. The police and troops didn't allow any vehicle to head towards Srinagar from other parts of Kashmir due to visit of Vice President of India, Mohammad Hamid Ansari, who visited to attend the annual convocation of the Kashmir University. The strike at Shopian entered its 22nd day with continuous protests. The police and CRPF troops quelled peaceful protests with tear gas shelling and rubber bullets, injuring 12 people including six women. One woman, named Razia, the daughter of Abdul Rasheed, was severely injured and admitted to SKIMs.
23 June 2009	On the Hurriyat's call, teachers throughout the Kashmir valley protested, demanding punishment for the culprits responsible for the incident. The largest protest was seen at Press Colony, Srinagar by the teachers. The Jammu Kashmir Freedom League's activists also protested at Lal Chowk, Srinagar, followed by a march towards the United Nations office to submit a memorandum about human rights violations in the valley but police prevented them.

=== Curfew ===
Date	Details
31 May 2009	An undeclared curfew was imposed in Shopian district.
1 June 2009	In the old city, section 144 crpc was imposed to maintain law and order. Police imposed restrictions on the movement of people.
30 May 2009	Hurriyat leaders Syed Ali Geelani, Mirwaz Umar Farooq, Yasin Malik, and Shabir Shah were kept under house arrest so as not to lead agitation.
3 June 2009	Several Peoples Democratic Party (PDP) activists were detained after they tried to carry out the protest demonstration at Lal Chowk in Islamabad township and the Awami National Conference (ANC) district President, Bashir Ahmad Pahalwan, was also detained. The Police arrested Hurriyat Conference (G) chairman, Syed Ali Shah Geelani, from his residence at Hyderpora and was released at mid night from Humhama Police Station.
5 June 2009	The JKLF Chairman, Yasin Malik, with some supporters, were detained by police while they were leading the protest against the incident after Friday prayers.
6 June 2009	The Hurriyat Conference (M), Chairman, Mirwaiz Umar Farooq, The Hurriyat Conference (G) chairman, Syed Ali Shah Geelani, the JKLF Chairman Yasin Malik, and about a dozen other separatist leaders remained under house arrest in the Kashmir Valley. The chief of the Democratic Freedom Party (DFP) Shabir Ahmad Shah and more than 70 other senior and second rank leaders also remained under detention in different jails and police stations.
10 June 2009	The SP of Shopian, Javed Iqbal Mattoo, was transferred to Ramban and Shahid Mehraj who was holding Deputy Commandant IRP, 12 replaced his position. This action was taken due to delays by him in filing FIR regarding the incident.

== See also ==
- Rape in Kashmir Conflict
