= 2015 Udhampur terrorist attack =

Terrorist incident in Udhampur, India

At 7:30 am 5 August 2015, two members of the Lashkar-e-Taiba terrorist group attacked a Border Security Force (BSF) convoy in Udhampur, killing two BSF troops and wounding 10 civilians. One of the assailants, Mohammed Naved fled, while his accomplice, Mohammed Noman was killed in the attack. Noman is said to have tried boarding the bus, but was intercepted and killed by CRPF Jawan Suresh Kumar. Naved fled the scene to the Udhampur village, where he took three locals as hostages. He was later overpowered by the hostages and subsequently arrested.

The attack occurred during a period of tension between Pakistan and India; mere days before talks hosted by the National Security Advisor, during which officials on both sides were set to discuss border-related issues between the two countries. Tensions quickly arose when it was discovered the attackers were of Pakistani origin, and claims that Pakistani officials were helping militants cross the Line of Control resurfaced.

The Lashkar-e-Tayyaba mastermind behind the attack, Abdul Rehman, was killed on October 29, 2015, in Kulgam, Kashmir, in a joint operation by the J&K Police, and the Indian Army. One of the operatives of the Lashkar-e-Taiba, Hanzla Adnan, who was behind the attack, was claimed by the Indian authorities that he was killed by Unknown gunman in Karachi, Pakistan.

Sabzar Bhat, a Hizbul Mujahideen militant and truck driver, was indicted for transporting the two attackers to the site of the attack on August 15.
