= Abu al-Qasim al-Zayyani =

Abu al-Qasim az-Zayyani
- أبو القاسم الزياني
- Born: 1734/35; Fes
- Died: 1833; Fes
- Occupations: historian, geographer, poet, statesman

Abu al-Qasim al-Zayyani (Arabic: أبو القاسم الزياني) or, in full, Abu al-Qasim ibn Ahmad ibn Ali ibn Ibrahim az-Zayyani (1734/35–1833) was a Moroccan historian, geographer, poet and statesman from the Berber Zayane tribe in Morocco. He undertook diplomatic missions to the Ottoman court and engineered government attempts to bring tribes under central authority. His writings include several historical accounts of the Ottoman and Alaouite dynasties. Az-Zayyani wrote fifteen works in the field of history and geography. Some authors even consider him the greatest historian of Morocco.

== Origins ==
Az-Zayyani has left his genealogy, which, according to his grandfather, goes back to Sanhaj, the ancestor of the Sanhaja tribes, by Zayyan, the eponymous ancestor of the tribe itself, by Amalu, father of Zayyan, and by al-Yasa', who would have converted to Islam in the reign of the Umayyad Caliph Abd al-Malik ibn Marwan (eighth century AD). He cites as the guarantor of this ancestry the great Berber genealogist Sabiq ibn Sulayman al-Matmati.

== Biography ==
On his return from the journey he made among the Zayyans in 1689, the Alaouite Sultan Isma'il brought back to Meknes az-Zayyani's grandfather, who became his Imam and died in this city the same year as him 1727. His son Ahmed then moved to Fez, where the future historian (az-Zayyani) was to be born eight years later.

Abu'l-Qasim az-Zayyani was born in Fes in 1734/35. He was from the Zayyan tribe, a big Berber tribe in Moroccan Middle Atlas, where his grandfather Ali ibn Ibrahim who was a Jjrisconsult and a valuable genealogist ,lived in the zawiyya of Aroggo, near Adekhsan. Among his grandfather's work was a book on Berber genealogy.

Abu'l-Qasim made his Islamic studies in Fes, which he completed in 1785. He was then twenty-three years old. He had taken courses in the mosques of al-Qarawiyyin and al-Andalusiyyin and frequented the two madrasas of al-Sahrij and al-'Attarin. His principal masters were, first of all, Ahmed ibn at-Tahir ach-Chargi, then the biographer Muhammad ibn at-Tayyib al-Qadiri, Abd al-Qadir Boukhiris, Mohammed Bennani, and above all the famous jurisconsult Abu Hafs 'Umar al-Fasi, to the lessons of which were pressed the already known ulama, like Abd as-Salam Hassin, al-'Arbi al-Qosantini, Muhammad Sahnun, al-Walid al-'Iraqi, Yahia ach-Chafchawani, Muhammad al-Huwwari and Muhammad ibn Abd as-Salam al-Fasi.

During the reign of Sultan 'Abd Allah, the year in which his studies ended, az-Zayyani accompanied his father and mother, who had resolved to accomplish the pilgrimage; He was their only son and they wanted to settle with him definitively in Medina. Thus the two houses and the library of the historian's father were sold. They first went to Cairo to join the caravan of the Egyptian pilgrims; But instead of gaining the Hijaz by land, they preferred to embark on the sea for Arabia by renting a boat. The journey was less fatiguing, and at the same time afforded the opportunity of making a commercial operation which might be fruitful. They bought, with all the money they had, various merchandise, which they carried from Cairo to Suez on renting camels. But bad luck had already begun to fall on az-Zayyani: during the crossing would happen the first of seven nakabat (calamities) who struck him during his life. Arrived in view of yanbu', the ship that carried pilgrims traffickers broke on the reefs, and the cargo was lost: passengers and crew escaped death. The Moroccan family landed on Arab land in the utmost destitution. Fortunately, az-Zayyani's mother had sewed three hundred pieces of gold in her belt to counteract a misadventure that was always possible in such a distant journey. She handed them over to her husband, who hired a mount to Jeddah and Mecca, and all three went on their pilgrimage. Then they continued on Medina with the Egyptian caravan and visited the tomb of the Prophet. But with such precarious resources they could no longer think of settling in the city. It was therefore necessary to return to Morocco. After having bought, with the sum which remained to them, some provisions of road, they returned slowly to Egypt, by land route, with the caravan of the pilgrims of this country. Arrived in Cairo, they could get some money, which allowed them to rest a little before getting back on the road. Instead of attending, during this time, the many schools of Cairo, where Islamic studies were taught, az-Zayyani found nothing better than "to learn alchemy and divination and to search for the peculiarities of metals and stones".

Nearly two years had passed since their departure from Fes. At the moment when they were going to resume their journey, they learned of the death of the Moroccan Sultan 'Abd Allah and the accession of his son Mohammed. At Alexandria, no boat weighed anchor; piracy was in full swing and, on the other hand, the Seven Years' War was ongoing. They ended, however, by embarking on a French ship leaving for Livorno. They arrived in this city and stayed there for four months, waiting for a new opportunity to leave, and, despairing of finding one, they finally decided to return to Morocco by land, to the Straits of Gibraltar, along the Mediterranean coasts of France and Spain. They thus passed to Marseilles and Barcelona, hoping to see the end of their odyssey soon. In Barcelona they learned that the French besieged Gibraltar and that it was impossible to cross the strait. They had to wait until the blockade was raised to be able to go to the port and from there to Tetouan. They arrived finally to Fez, having on them only a sum of seven silver mithqal. Immediately in his hometown, Abu al-Qasim az-Zayyani went to visit his old fellow students. His trip had made him different from these latter, whom he found, for the most part, attached to the makhzen of the new Sultan Mohammed ben Abdallah. However, in order not to be seen zd inferior by his former classmates, he immediately applied for a secretarial post, which was granted to him. His father, who had probably suffered disrespect in the previous reign, tried by all means to dissuade him from entering the administrative career. Ez-Zayyani didn't change his decision.

The task of imperial secretary in Morocco remained unchanged for a long time. The katib presented himself at the palace every day, except Thursday and Friday. He often wrote or copied there. Often the letters addressed to the governors of the cities and the tribes, the Sherifian rescripts, and circular letters were among the copy work. Moroccan Makhzen was a center of intrigues and slander. Scribes were always on the look-out for the slightest oversight of their colleagues, ready to denounce each other for the slightest breach of the established rule. The sultans' officials contributed for centuries to anarchy and disorder; sovereign individuals were rare, who have been able to put a stop to their actions and escape from their ever-present guardianship. Ez-Zayyani, who, in this milieu, almost arrived as an intruder, after a long stay abroad, with new acquaintances and an open mind, was skilful enough to keep himself in place and to make his qualities recognised soon.

== Death ==
According to the author of salwat al-anfas, al-Kattānī. Az-zayyani died at the time of the Asr of Sunday 17 November 1833. He would have lived thus ninety-nine years. He was buried, by order of the sultan, in the zawiyya of the Nasiriyya Sufi order, which is in Fes, in the district of es-Siaj.

== Works ==
We know, thanks to Torjomana, the order in which he wrote these books. Those are:

- Al-Tarǧumān al-muʻarib ʻan duwal al-mašriq waʾl-maġrib (A general history since the creation of the world until the thirteenth century of the Hijrah)
- Al-bustan al-jarif fi dawlat awlad mawlay 'ali al-sharif (A history of the Alaouite dynasty)
- Ad-Durrat as-saniyyat al-faʻiqa fî kachf madhâhib ahl el-bidaʻ min ar-ra-wâfiḍ waʾl-khawârij waʾl-muʻtazila waʾz-zanâdiqa (An urjūza on the heresies of Islam)
- Alfiyyat as-sulûk fî wafayât al-mulûk (An obituary of a thousand verses rajaz, relating to all Muslim rulers, with a comment)
- Tuḥfat al-ḥādī al-muṭrib fī rafʻ nasab shurafāʼ al-Maghrib (A genealogy treatise of Maghreb's Ashraf)
- Risâlat as-sulûk fi-ma yajib ʻalaʾl-mulùk (A political treatise for sovereigns)
- Riḥlat el-hodhdhâq li-mochâhadat al-buldân waʾl-âfâq (A summary of geography)
- Jamharat al-tījān wa-fahrasat al-yāqūt wa-al-luʼluʼ wa-al-marjān fī dhikr al-mulūk wa-ashyākh al-Sulṭān al-Mawlá Sulaymān (A fahrasa)
- Kachf al-asrar fi ʾr-radd ʻala ahl al-bida' al-achrar (A refutation of the heresies of Islam)

== Bibliography ==
- Lévi-Provençal, Évariste (1922). Les historiens des Chorfa: essai sur la littérature historique et biographique au Maroc du XVIe au XXe siècle (in French). Paris: Émile Larose.
