= Mohammad Naved =

Mohammad Naved aka Qasim/Usman is a Pakistani man who was arrested in Udhampur, Jammu & Kashmir, for his alleged involvement with the terrorist organization Lashkar-e-Taiba and 2015 Udhampur terrorist attack.
