= AK Mosharraf Hossain Akand =

Bangladeshi politician

Member of Bangladesh Parliament
- In office 1973–1975

Personal details
- Party: Awami League

Abul Kasem Mosharraf Hossain Akand (Bengali: এ কে মোশাররফ হোসেন আকন্দ) is an Awami League politician in Bangladesh and a former member of parliament for Mymensingh-14.

== Career ==
Akand was elected to the National Assembly of Pakistan in 1970 for Mymensingh-VI. He was on the 34-member committee that drafted the Constitution of Bangladesh in 1972.

Akand was elected to parliament from Mymensingh-14 as an Awami League candidate in 1973.
