= Burhan Wani =

Kashmiri Islamist militant (1994–2016)

- Born: 1994; Dadasara, Tral, Pulwama district, Jammu and Kashmir, India
- Died: 8 July 2016 (aged 21) or 22); Bumdoora, Kokernag, Anantnag district, Jammu and Kashmir, India
- Burial place: Tral, Jammu and Kashmir; 33.904°N 75.085°W
- Military career
- Allegiance: Hizbul Mujahideen
- Active: 2010–2016
- Conflicts: Kashmir conflict: Insurgency in Jammu and Kashmir †

Burhan Wani (19 September 1994 – 8 July 2016) was the leader of Hizbul Mujahideen, an Islamist terrorist organization of the Kashmir conflict. (Note: Hizbul Mujahideen was designated as a designated as a terrorist group by the United States, European Union, India and Canada.) He had become a popular figure amongst the local Kashmiri populace, having done so primarily through a strong social media presence, and was responsible for moulding the insurgency in Jammu and Kashmir into a youth-oriented movement. Wani was a militant leader and had reportedly recruited numerous foot-soldiers through his personal efforts.

As a militant leader, Wani was actively sought by Indian security forces, who had imposed a bounty for his capture. He was located in a remote village in the Anantnag district of Jammu and Kashmir and subsequently killed in a firefight with Indian forces on 8 July 2016. Wani's killing sparked massive protests across the entire Kashmir Valley in what became the worst span of unrest in the region since the 2010 unrest. As a result, the state of Jammu and Kashmir was placed under 53 consecutive days of curfew, which was fully lifted by 31 August 2016. The protests that followed Wani's killing resulted in the deaths of more than 96 people and injuries to over 15,000 civilians and 4,000 Indian security personnel.

== Early life ==
Wani was born in 1994 in Dadasara, a village situated on the outskirts of the town of Tral in the Pulwama district of India Union Territory of Jammu and Kashmir, to Muzaffar Ahmad Wani, the principal of a public higher-secondary school, and Maimoona Muzaffar, a postgraduate of science who taught Qur'an classes in her village. Muzaffar was affiliated with the Jamaat-e-Islami Kashmir organization and had expressed sentiments of Kashmiri separatism early on, also taking pride in having taught to students who would later become Kashmir Administrative Service and Kashmir Police Service officers. Burhan had four siblings. The town of TraI has been a perpetual militant hotbed of hardline separatism.

== Militancy career ==
Wani planned to be a doctor and had obtained more than 90% marks in his Class 8 exam but left his home on 16 October 2010, ten days before his secondary exam and enrolled for the militant cause at about an age of 15, joining Hizbul Mujahideen. His family claims that the root of his disillusion with Indian state apparatus laid in an incident in the last summer, when state police allegedly beat him up, along with his brother Khalid and a friend for no fault of theirs, after asking them to purchase cigarettes for them. Burhan's cousins were already involved with the militant movement since about 2008, and had joined Hizbul Mujahideen in 2010.

Burhan Wani used social-media, leveraging "a clever mix of ideology, religion and a deep sense of persecution" in chaste Kashmiri to romanticize the militant movement and wielded unforeseen influence in the local populace as a poster-boy, attracting numerous young adults into the cause. He oft-elaborated about the idea of India being entirely incompatible with Islam thus mandating a destruction at any cost, and aimed of unfurling the flag of Islam on Delhi's Red Fort. In 2013 Burhan's notability as a mujahid was further boosted, after he was erroneously described as being killed, across social media.

There was a remarkable increase in the anti-India rhetoric of Burhan's speeches, after his brother Khalid was killed by the Indian Army on 13 April 2015 when he went to meet him (Burhan), along with three friends. The army claimed that Khalid was a militant sympathizer who had taken his friends to get them recruited and was subsequently killed in an encounter. The family of Khalid however alleged that he died in custody, claiming that his body showed no bullet wounds but clinical signs of physical torture. The three friends of Khalid meanwhile escaped but ran into an army cordon, where they alleged being tortured before being rescued by the state police.

In August 2015, the state government imposed a bounty of ₹10,00,000 on Burhan's head. In another report, The Diplomat claimed that Burhan had $1500 bounty on him. A Facebook post about a month back showing Burhan along with 10 other militants in militant attire with heavy arms had gone viral in Kashmir. The videos however continued, with him urging people to take up arms against the state and to refuse to collaborate with Indian elements. Police have often approached the judiciary, for enacting bans on social networking pages that disseminated Burhan's messages.. In a video released in June 2016, he assured Amarnath pilgrims of safe passage but threatened to attack the proposed colonies for armed personnel and opposed separate colonies for Kashmiri Pandits, describing them as being "on Israel Pattern for Hindus". He also urged the state-police to stay out of their way, threatening to attack all security forces. Security forces couldn't trace back specific attack on armed forces back to Burhan but he is believed to have masterminded several of them.

== Death ==
Burhan Wani was killed in an anti-insurgency operation on 8 July 2016 along with two other militants, later identified as Sartaj Ahmad Sheikh and Pervaiz Ahmad Lashkari. He and his companions were killed in Bumdoora village in Kokernag area by a joint team of the special operations group of the Jammu and Kashmir Police and 19 Rashtriya Rifles. Security forces later stated that the operation had actually begun on 7 June when Burhan, along with his companions, had come to Kokernag in order to procure weapons. Some army and police officials later said that the security forces had received intelligence regarding the presence of Sheikh but did not know Wani too was present along with him. The state's Chief Minister Mehbooba Mufti and the Deputy Chief Minister Nirmal Kumar Singh also stated that the security forces were unaware of his presence and would have given him a chance had they known about his presence there.

According to police officials, the security forces faced resistance from locals who resorted to stone-pelting. The encounter began at 16:30 and ended at 18:15. The militants were hiding in a house during the operation and started firing on the troops conducting search operations. All three were killed in the ensuing encounter. Jammu and Kashmir Police's Director General K. Rajendra confirmed that Wani was killed in an exchange of fire between security personnel and the militants.

The local residents denied awareness of Wani's presence in the village. According to them, the police arrived around noon and said that they were combing the area in preparation for an inauguration by the Chief Minister Mehbooba Mufti. They cordoned off the area by 16:00 and took positions around the house where Burhan and his associates were present. When the militants tried to come out and escape, they were shot down. After their death, hundreds of villagers came out mourning the death and clashed with the police, CRPF and attacked army camps in the area. He is believed to have been succeeded by Sabzar Bhat, who was also killed by Indian security forces shortly afterwards.

=== Reaction ===
A large crowd attended his funeral on 9 July. The crowd was estimated to number 200,000 and was described by reporters as the largest ever gathering. The last rite prayers were also performed in absentia in all major towns of Kashmir. His body wrapped in the flag of Pakistan was buried next to that of his brother Khalid in Tral. Militants were also present at his funeral and offered him a three-volley salute.

After the news of his death spread, violent protests erupted in some areas of Kashmir Valley. Separatist leaders called for shutdown in Kashmir which was repeatedly extended before being called off in February 2017. Police stations and security forces were attacked by mobs. Stone pelting was reported from many parts in Kashmir, including upon transit camps of Kashmiri Pandits. Internet services along with train services were suspended and the national highway was shut down. The Amarnath pilgrimage was repeatedly resumed and suspended due to the unrest. More than 200 Kashmiri Pandit employees fled the transit camps during night time on 12 July due to the attacks by protesters on the camps. The house where Burhan was killed was set ablaze by a mob on suspicion that its residents had tipped-off the security forces about Burhan. Curfew was imposed in all districts of Kashmir on 15 July and mobile phone networks were suspended. The curfew was lifted from all parts on 31 August 2016. More than 90 people died in the unrest and over 15,000 civilians were injured. Indian security forces reportedly used assault rifles to open fire on protestors. Over 4,000 security personnel were also injured during the unrest.

Peoples Democratic Party leader Muzaffar Hussain Baig alleged that the standard operating procedure had not been followed during the encounter involving Wani and his accomplices. Baig demanded that a commission be appointed to probe Wani's killing. Deputy Chief Minister Nirmal Singh refused, stating that it was an anti-terrorist operation and there was no need for an inquiry.

A day after Wani's death former Chief Minister of state Omar Abdullah said that his killing had made him the new icon of the disaffected section of the Kashmiri society and further warned that more Kashmiris will join the militancy after his death. On 12 July, Pakistan's Prime Minister Nawaz Sharif in a statement expressed "shock" over the killing of Burhan Wani which was criticised by the Indian government. Sharif called Wani a "martyr" on 15 July. The Indian Ministry of External Affairs in response criticized Pakistan for "glorifying" terrorists belonging to proscribed terrorist organisations. Indian Prime Minister Narendra Modi criticised the media alleging it was portraying the slain Wani as a hero. Pakistan's Ambassador to the United Nations Maleeha Lodhi during meeting with UN officials raised the killing of Wani describing it as an "assassination of a Kashmiri youth leader". During his speech at the United Nations General Assembly on 21 September, Sharif described Burhan Wani as a "young leader" who had emerged as a symbol of the latest "Kashmiri Intifada".

His family was allowed to be given ex-gratia compensation of ₹4,00,000 by the Jammu and Kashmir government in December 2016 for the controversial killing of his older brother Khalid. This led to protest by opposition parties as well as Bharatiya Janta Party. Chief Minister Mufti denied on 18 January 2017 that any compensation had been paid.

== Legacy ==
=== India ===
India arrested journalist Asif Sultan in August 2019, after he wrote a piece titled "The Rise of Burhan Wani".

Wani became the face of the Kashmir independence movement, and was also compared with the revolutionary Bhagat Singh.

Wani had released a group photo on 1 July 2015 of himself seated with ten other militants, all armed and dressed in army fatigues, which went viral. The militants in the photo were Sabzar Ahmad Bhat, Waseem Malla, Naseer Ahmad Pandit, Ishfaq Hameed, Tariq Ahmad Pandit, Afaaquallah Bhat, Adil Ahmad Khanday, Saddam Padder, Waseem Ahmad Shah and Anees. They have all since been killed, apart from Tariq, who surrendered in May 2016.

In 2021, Muzaffar Wani, the father of Burhan Wani, was photographed unfurling the Indian national flag at a government school in Tral during an Independence Day event.

Several separatist and terrorist organizations were accused of inciting unrest in Jammu and Kashmir following the killing of Burhan Wani, allegedly acting under instructions from Pakistan’s Inter-Services Intelligence (ISI) according to Indian sources. In 2024, six such groups—including four factions of the Jammu and Kashmir Peoples League and two factions of the Muslim Conference—were banned under the Unlawful Activities (Prevention) Act (UAPA). The Centre stated that these groups organized violent protests and issued hartal calls that led to 86 civilian deaths and injuries to thousands. Despite multiple opportunities, including public hearings in Srinagar, none of the organizations challenged the bans, and the tribunal upheld the government's decision after reviewing the evidence, interpreting their silence as an acceptance of the charges.

=== Pakistan ===
In July 2017, Pakistan Today praised Wani and compared his death to the death of Che Guevara, stating "History repeats itself".

On the Pakistani independence day in August 2017, Wani was featured on a special train named Azadi Train which was organised by Pakistan Railways in the memory of the country's national heroes.

== Bibliography ==
In 2020, Pakistan-based authors released sympathetic biographies of Wani: Zulkaif Riaz in English with Burhan Muzaffar Wani, and Bashir Sadozai in Urdu with Burhan Wani Shaheed.

== In popular culture ==
- Burhan Wani's killing was depicted in Hindi-language movie Article 370.

== See also ==
- Kashmir conflict, ongoing territorial conflict between India and Pakistan since 1947 and between India and China since 1962
- Insurgency in Jammu and Kashmir, an ongoing militant uprising against the Indian administration in Jammu and Kashmir
- Mediation of the Kashmir dispute by the United Nations, international mediation of the India–Pakistan dispute
- 2009 Shopian rape and murder case, incident in Indian-administered Jammu and Kashmir
- 2010 Kashmir unrest, series of protests and riots in Indian-administered Jammu and Kashmir
- 2016–2017 Kashmir unrest, series of protests following the killing of Burhan Wani in July 2016
