= Naved Ahmed (Islamabad cricketer) =

Pakistani cricketer (born 1971)

Personal information
- Born: 22 April 1971 (age 55); Islamabad, Pakistan
- Batting: Right-handed
- Bowling: Right-arm leg spin
- Role: Batsman

Domestic team information
- Years: Team
- 1993–2001: Islamabad

Career statistics
Competition	FC	LA
Matches	27	15
Runs scored	669	359
Batting average	15.20	23.93
100s/50s	0/3	1/1
Top score	72	120
Balls bowled	271	2
Wickets	3	0
Bowling average	65.33	n/a
5 wickets in innings	0	0
10 wickets in match	0	n/a
Best bowling	2/22	0/4
Catches/stumpings	33/–	7/–
- Source: CricketArchive, 20 May 2015

Naved Ahmed (born 22 April 1971) is a former Pakistani cricketer. A right-handed top-order batsman, his career for Islamabad spanned from 1993 to 2001, and included a number of matches as captain.

== Career ==
Born in Islamabad, Naved played at under-19 level for Islamabad, and in January 1992 scored 45 against the touring English under-19 side. He made his senior Wills Cup debut in October 1993, against Rawalpindi. On his first-class debut the following season, against Lahore City in the Quaid-i-Azam Trophy, Naved made a first-innings duck, and was one of nine batsman to fall to Naved Anjum (who finished with 9/35). In the second innings he was out to Test bowler Abdul Qadir for one run. During the 1995–96 Wills Cup season, Naved was appointed captain for all three of Islamabad's matches, despite being only 24 and having played only one prior match in the format. He first became a regular for Islamabad during the 1996–97 season, when his seven Quaid-i-Azam matches yielded 223 runs (the sixth-best return for his team). His season included a maiden first-class half-century, 72 against Lahore City, and also a maiden limited-overs half-century, a man of the match 69 against Peshawar in the Wills Cup.

Naved also had a successful 1998–99 season, entrenching himself as one of Islamabad's opening batsmen. Against Khan Research Labs in the Tissot Cup (the renamed Wills Cup), he scored the only century of his career, finishing with 120 from 121 balls as Islamabad successfully chased a target of 321. In the Quaid-i-Azam, he played eight out of nine possible matches, and finished with 244 runs, including two half-centuries. Naved also made his first-class captaincy debut, captaining Islamabad in three consecutive matches late in the season. The following season, he briefly captained Islamabad in both formats, but was later dropped from the side altogether as his form deteriorated. However, he did take career-best bowling figures against the Karachi Blues in one Quaid-e-Azam match, finishing with 2/22 bowling right-arm leg spin. The 2000–01 season was Naved's last at first-class level. He finished his career with 669 first-class runs at an average of just 15.20, with a slightly better list-A record – 359 runs at 23.93.
