= Gufkral =

Archaeological site in Jammu and Kashmir

Gufkral Cave
- Location within Jammu and Kashmir Location within India
- Interactive map of Gufkral Cave
- Coordinates: 33°55′30″N 75°06′30″E
- Discovery: 1981

Gufkral ('guf' means cave and 'kral' means potter) is a site inhabited by potters who utilize the caves. Caves and archeological site are located at Banmir village in the Tral Tehsil of the Pulwama District, in the Kashmir Valley of Jammu and Kashmir, India. The cave of Gufkral is one of the oldest caves in Kashmir and some estimates trace their origin 2000-3000 BCE.

The excavation by an Archaeological Survey of India team led by A K Sharma from 18 August to 20 October in 1981 revealed that the site was occupied for five periods from the Aceramic Neolithic to Megalithic periods.

== Location ==
Gufkral is situated 41 km (25 mi) southeast of Srinagar near the tehsil town of Tral in the Pulwama district of the Kashmir Valley in Jammu and Kashmir, India.
