= Dadasara =

Village in Jammu and Kashmir, India

Dadasara is a village in the Tral sub-district in the Pulwama district of the Indian union territory of Jammu and Kashmir..

The name of Dadasara is derived from the two words "Dadah", meaning deep, and "Sar" meaning lake. Dadasara is believed to have been once a deep lake. It is second largest village of Tral by area and population.
