= Global Islamic Media Front =

Islamist propaganda organization associated with al-Qaeda

The Global Islamic Media Front (GIMF) is an Islamist propaganda organization that is associated with the terrorist group, al-Qaeda, and other jihadist groups. The GIMF is known by the U.S. Federal Bureau of Investigation (FBI) as an "underground media" organization. The GIMF specializes in production of jihadist material for distribution. It is one of several organizations that jihadists use to spread information via the Internet, including the well-known As-Sahab. Their slogan that is used on their materials is "Observing Mujahideen News and Inspiring the Believers." There is no indication who the leader of this organization is.

== History ==
The GIMF has a direct precedent in two "sister" propaganda platforms: the Global Islamic Media Group (GIMG) and Global Islamic Media Centre (GIMC). The former was a distribution list set up on June 29, 2001, in one of the virtual groups spaces offered free of charge by Yahoo to its e-mail account users and was followed later by a website. Access to its materials required a password. Six months after it was created, GIMG had over 600 subscribers, a figure that grew constantly until it reached 7400 by the time the group disappeared in the spring of 2004. The list was administered from Canada by a man nicknamed "Abu Banan" to distribute ideological and propaganda manuals and texts. In May 2004, following the publication of the video showing the beheading in Iraq of American contractor Nick Berg by the Jordanian terrorist Abu Musab Al Zarqawi, the website disappeared after being targeted by anonymous hackers. The second group, the GIMC, was closely linked from its beginnings to Ahmad al-Wathiq Billah, the anonymous author of numerous Internet texts on the global jihad strategy.

The Global Islamic Media Front was first recognized as an extension of Al Qaeda in March 2003 when GIMF published a strategy paper on its Yahoo! Groups account suggesting a terror attack in Spain, which ultimately occurred 3 months later. The group was called Global Islamic Media (GIM). In 2004, GIM had 7,400 members which Al Qaeda was communicating with. It has since been deleted. Yahoo! Groups was a medium for Islamist extremist communications as a group profile can easily be deleted. GIM was used to release statements and was recognized by Al Qaeda and its followers as the only veritable source of Al Qaeda communications at the time. Al Qaeda leadership informed its followers that all information released on the internet must be routed through its Yahoo! Group to be valid. Since the dismantling of the GIM Yahoo! Group, GIMF material can be found in jihadist threads across the internet.

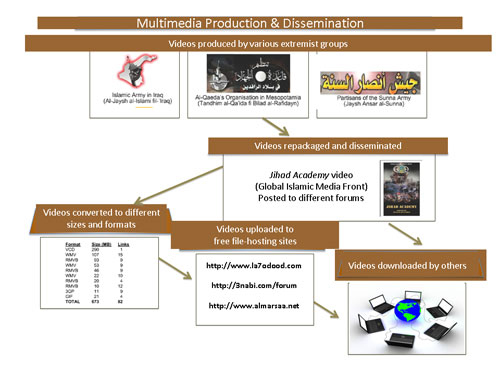
A flow chart produced by the FBI demonstrating the known production and dissemination process for GIMF videos

The GIMF provides translation, repackaging, and dissemination services of jihadist and extremist videos. They distribute material directly from the mother sites of jihadist organizations as well as collect leadership-authorized material from jihadist websites and put it together for distribution. The repackaged videos are converted to various sizes and formats and uploaded to free file-hosting sites for easy download for viewers. The process used by GIMF to produce and disseminate videos is pictured in the figure to the right. The other major task that the Global Islamic Media Front undertakes is to provide testing and confirmation services for validating that the materials it releases are authentic. GIMF translates its productions from Arabic primarily into German, but translates into English and French as well.

== Themes ==
GIMF materials utilize one of the most important techniques of propaganda: repetition. (see Propaganda “techniques”) Researchers at the Combating Terrorism Center at West Point produced a study that examined 100 recurring visual themes in extremist Islamic propaganda. When one examines GIMF-produced images, one sees the same motifs time and again. The use of visual motifs helps develop shared understandings and a relatable story line among jihadists.

In addition to visual themes, researchers have found three main communication themes in GIMF videos: legitimating ("Things are getting worst for you/the enemy and better for us"), propagating ("We continue to plan attacks against you"), and intimidating ("We easily penetrate your security walls").

The IntelCenter classifies seven different categories of jihadist videos: produced videos (the most advanced video releases done by jihadist groups that includes footage from several categories combined to target a large audience), operational videos (videos of attacks executed by a group), hostage videos (videos made in order to make demands and show hostages. Daniel Pearl was featured in a hostage video), statement videos (strategic videos of statements made by jihadist leaders in order to send a message to a large audience. Osama bin Laden's statement videos with English subtitles are an example.), tribute videos (videos made to commemorate the death of a martyr or a mujahid killed by an enemy), internal training videos (the only products that are not intended for public consumption. They are rarely edited and are utilized for internal purposes only), and instructional videos (used to instruct jihadi members in a specific skill. The most common is the instructional video for making a suicide bomber vest).

A large portion of GIMF productions has been devoted to militant training videos. Al Qaeda and other jihadist groups realize the importance of the internet to train its followers. GIMF has produced instructional videos illustrating how to make and use explosive devices. The benefit of these videos to members of Al Qaeda is that they can be viewed anywhere there is internet access, allowing for the mobility of and increasing in training sites.

== Voice of the Caliphate ==
The Voice of the Caliphate is the major publication that GIMF produces. It is the jihadi internet video newscast that debuted in 2005. It was a new approach taken by Al Qaeda to reach an audience. Instead of relying on television networks and other news media to publish its videos, Voice of the Caliphate enabled jihadists to spread messages and propaganda without censorship. "The name of the broadcast refers to the Islamic empire that emerged following the death of the prophet Muhammad in the 7th century, eventually stretching from Turkey to Spain and creating an era of Islamic influence that bin Laden has said Muslims should reestablish."
