= Muhammad Ahsan Dar =

Kashmiri Islamist separatist leader

- Born: 1952 (age 73–74); Sariwarpora Pattan, Baramulla, Jammu and Kashmir, India
- Other name: Master Ahsan Dar
- Occupation: Ex-School-Teacher
- Known for: Founding the Hizbul Mujahideen
- Children: 4

Muhammad Ahsan Dar (Kashmiri: مُحمد احسن ڈار; born 1952) is a Kashmiri Islamist militant separatist leader from Jammu and Kashmir. He was the founder of an Islamist militant group called Ansarul Islam in mid-1980s, which later became the core of Hizbul Mujahideen. Formed in September 1989, Hizbul Mujahideen was an umbrella group of a dozen Islamist groups in the Kashmir Valley and was sponsored by Pakistan's Inter-Services Intelligence and Jamaat-e-Islami. Ahsan Dar served as the head of the united group for a few years, but was marginalised the Jamaat-e-Islami patron Syed Salahuddin. He later founded a new group called Muslim Mujahideen in 1992, which operated for a few years. It was eventually neutralised by Hizbul Mujahideen and Indian security forces, and Ahsan Dar retired from militancy.

== Early life ==
Ahsan Dar was born in Sariwarpora, Pattan tehsil, Baramulla district in Jammu and Kashmir, India.

He worked as a school teacher in Jamaat-e-Islami school (run by Falah-e-Aam Trust). He was given the nickname "Master" when he joined militancy.

== Militancy ==
In 1984, when Dar was visiting Mumbai for a family visit, he was queried by someone about Maqbool Bhat. To his embarrassment, he did not know who he was. He later learnt about him and decided to become a separatist. He sought out an acquaintance who knew the techniques of militancy, and obtained lessons, sharing them with his friends.

=== Ansarul Islam ===
According to the received version of events, Dar went to Pakistan in 1986 on a passport. Pakistani authorities told him that they were not yet prepared for him but would contact him when it was time. (Note: This would appear to be the time when Pakistan was negotiating with the Jammu Kashmir Liberation Front (JKLF), whose agenda was independence for the whole of the former princely state of Jammu and Kashmir, including the Pakistani-administered portions.) He was given a "letter", presumably certifying this. Returning to Kashmir, Dar formed the group Ansarul Islam ("helpers of Islam"). Other prominent members of the group were Hilal Ahmed Mir (a.k.a. Nasirul Islam, "friend of Islam"), Mohammed Ramzan Sofi (a.k.a. General Abdullah) and Ghulam Rasool Shah (a.k.a. Imran Rahi).

According to journalist Arif Jamal, (Note: Arif Jamal was described in 2009 as "a former contributing writer to the New York Times" and "a visiting fellow at the Centre on International Cooperation at New York University". He had "worked for the Muslim, the News, and the Pakistan Times, as well as for international media including Radio France International and the CBC." (Jamal, Shadow War 2009, back cover) Much of his information is from interviews conducted with Kashmiri militants in Pakistan and also militant literature published in Pakistan in Urdu.) on the other hand, the group had long been existence before Ahsan Dar's involvement. It was founded by Hilal Ahmed Mir in 1984 under the name Shubbabul Islam and later changed its name to Ansarul Islam. The group trained its members in the use of local guns at first and later sent them to Afghanistan for training in automatic weapons, through the Kashmir Line of Control, in the middle of 1986. The group's aim was to establish the unity of ummah (the worldwide community of Muslims) and establish a caliphate.

Members of Ansarul Islam had links to the Jamaat-e-Islami Kashmir, and were opposed to the secular mission of the Jammu and Kashmir Liberation Front (JKLF). However, when the JKLF launched an armed insurgency in July 1988, Ansarul Islam also operated under its banner. It regarded itself as an "unofficial wing" of the JKLF. Indian security forces held Ansarul Islam responsible for the bombings on 31 July, and started a large-scale roundup of Muslim youth. Ahsan Dar and other senior leadership of Ansarul Islam were arrested. (Note: According to Arif Jamal, the bombings were actually carried out by Al-Hamza, another Islamist group that was also operating under the JKLF banner. (Jamal, Shadow War 2009, p. 139))

Ahsan Dar escaped from a hospital when he was taken for a medical checkup after a few months, (Note: Biberman, Gambling with Violence (2019, p. 82) states "eight months in prison".) he found that most of his colleagues were either in prison or had gone to Pakistan. Dar went to Pakistan himself, and spent a month in a rented house with twenty other aspiring militants. He returned to the Valley in the summer of 1989 and met Syed Ali Shah Geelani. Geelani was glad to help but only in his individual capacity. Jamaat-e-Islami had not yet signed up to militancy.

=== Hizbul Mujahideen ===
According to the received version of the events, Ahsan Dar co-founded a new organisation called Hizbul Mujahideen ("party of holy warriors") along with Hilal Ahmed Mir. The version accepts that it was Mir's idea, who reportedly told Dar that he had to take more credit for his (the group's) work, instead of benefiting the JKLF. Since Ansarul Islam was known to the authorities, they needed to operate under a new name.

According to Arif Jamal, the majlis-i-shoura of Ansarul Islam met at Hadiderpura (Budgam district) on 11 June 1989 and decided to change the name to Hizbul Mujahideen in order to broaden its appeal. The group elected Hilal Ahmed Mir as its amir. Ahsan Dar is not mentioned in this context.

Parallel to this development, the Jamaat-e-Islami of Azad Kashmir sent a clandestine militant called Masood Sarfraz to the Kashmir Valley with the mission of bringing all the Islamist militant groups under a single umbrella to form a serious organisation parallel to the JKLF. Hizbul Mujahideen also turned out to be the chosen name for Sarfraz. He brought together some of the smaller militant cells heretofore operating under the JKLF banner in September 1989 and formed a parallel "Hizbul Mujahideen". After three weeks of negotiations, the two groups merged in October 1989. At this meeting, Ahsan Dar was chosen as the chief commander and at a later meeting Hilal Ahmed Mir was chosen as the amir. (Note: The preference for Ahsan Dar at this stage would seem to be his Jamaat-e-Islami background. Many of the militants had Jamaat background and Pakistan's ISI had wanted the militancy to be under Jamaat's control. Hilal Ahmed Mir was of Deobandi persuasion, and had no affinity to the Jamaat.)

=== Jamaat-e-Islami control ===
Dar was also affiliated with Jamaat-e-Islami. Though Hizbul had no official support from Jamaat, several of its members and affiliates were among Hizbul's founders. The pro-independence JKLF's expansion and growth in power worried both the Jamaat and Pakistan. In an attempt to counter it, Jamaat started taking over Hizbul Mujahideen and in 1990, Dar declared Hizbul as the "sword arm of Jamaat". Yusuf Shah a.k.a. Syed Salahuddin who was a staunch Jamaati, gradually started taking over the leadership of Hizbul. Dar, the chief commander, despite the Jamaat takeover had become increasingly independent and was opposed to Jamaat's plan to impose a "shura"-style council leadership. Dar was also disillusioned by the killings perpetrated by Hizbul Mujahideen on members of other militant organizations and pro-independence leaders and activists. He was expelled by Salahuddin loyalists in 1991 and formed his own group along with the loyalists in 1992, naming it as "Muslim Mujahideen". The group quickly fell apart after his arrest in 1993.

In spite of all this, Dar, however, remained close to Syed Salahuddin, who also heads the United Jihad Council.

== Current life ==
He was arrested and released in 1999 after seven years in detention. He was last arrested on 14 January 2009 and released on 25 December 2012.

== See also ==
- Syed Ali Shah Geelani
- Hurriyat and Problems before Plebiscite
- Kashmir conflict
- 2014 Jammu and Kashmir Legislative Assembly election

== Bibliography ==
- Biberman, Yelena (2019), Gambling with Violence: State Outsourcing of War in Pakistan and India, Oxford University Press, ISBN 9780190929961
- Garner, George (2013). "Chechnya and Kashmir: The Jihadist Evolution of Nationalism to Jihad and Beyond". Terrorism and Political Violence. 25 (3): 419–434. doi:10.1080/09546553.2012.664202.
- Jamal, Arif (2009), Shadow War: The Untold Story of Jihad in Kashmir, Melville House, ISBN 978-1-933633-59-6
- Joshi, Manoj (1999), The Lost Rebellion, Penguin Books, ISBN 978-0-14-027846-0
- Riedel, Bruce (2012), Deadly Embrace: Pakistan, America, and the Future of the Global Jihad, Brookings Institution Press, ISBN 978-0-8157-2283-0
- Staniland, Paul (2014), Networks of Rebellion: Explaining Insurgent Cohesion and Collapse, Cornell University Press, ISBN 978-0-8014-7102-5
- Wani, Aijaz Ashraf (2019), What Happened to Governance in Kashmir?, Oxford University Press India, ISBN 978-0-19-909715-9
