= Abdul Majeed Dar =

Commander of Hizbul Mujahideen

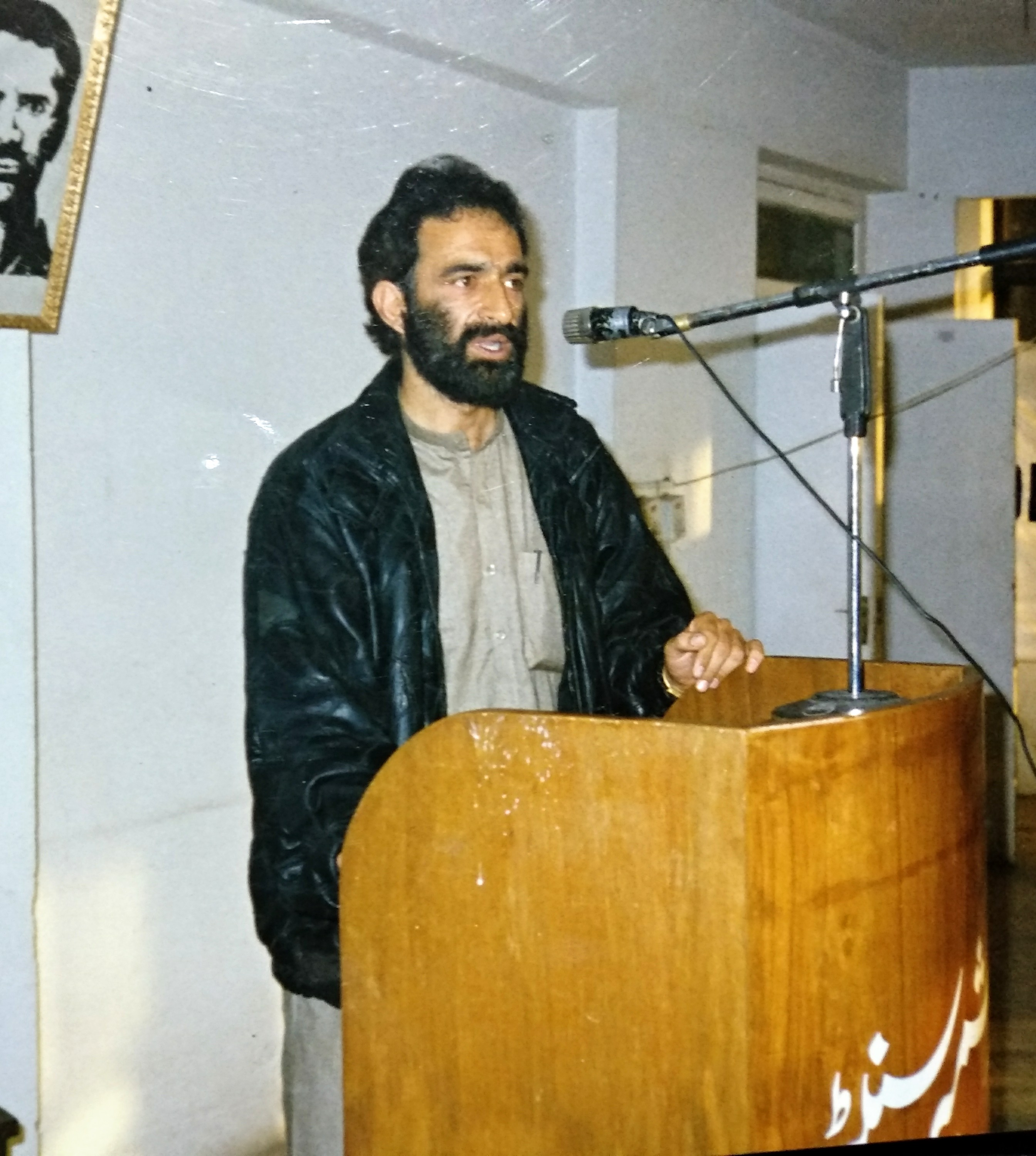
- Born: Sopore, Jammu & Kashmir
- Allegiance: Hizbul Mujahideen
- Rank: Former Chief Commander
- Commands: Hizbul Mujahideen till 2001
- Other work: Politician, Peace Activist

Abdul Majeed Dar was a former chief commander of the militant group Hizbul Mujahideen in Jammu & Kashmir till 2001. He later gave up violence and sought to restore peace in Kashmir.

He was a Politician by profession. Dar originated from the town of Sopore where he worked with the Muslim league during 1970's. In this period, he was involved with Syed Ali Geelani and went to jail several times. In the late 1980s, after the rigged 1987 elections, he became a militant along with his friend Fazl-ul-Haq Qureshi. By 1990, he was the leader of the organization Tahreek-e-Jihad-e-Islami (TJI) along with Bashir Ahmed Regoo alias Bashir Reagan who was given the name Reagan for his intelligence. In 1991, Dar merged this group with the Hizb, bringing in several thousand followers. In the following years, rivalries developed within the Hizb, culminating in a killing of 21 people in an Azad Kashmir village in near the border in 1998.

== Visions of peace ==
Praveen Swami, citing friends of Dar, has written that soon afterwards, he went for Hajj, and had a revelation standing in front of the Kaaba, and where saw "a vision of the suffering that a decade of terror had inflicted on Jammu and Kashmir." Eventually, after the much-maligned Chittisinghpura massacre of March 2000, several voices within the Hizb joined Dar in seeking a return to more peaceful approaches. In July 2000, Dar, along with four other Hizb commanders, declared a unilateral ceasefire in a declaration from the outskirts of Srinagar. The ceasefire was ratified by the Azad Kashmir-based commander Sayeed Salahudeen, but was criticized strongly in the Pakistan media. It was withdrawn by Salahudeen by September.

At the time, Dar had said, "we want to show the world that we are not hard-liners and we are flexible in the search for a solution."

Unsubstantiated rumors claimed that Dar been in touch with the Indian nodal intelligence agency Research and Analysis Wing (RAW) and also the Intelligence Branch (IB), and that Hizb had elected him operational commander in order to declare the ceasefire. Though the move was immediately endorsed by the Hizb leadership, it led to deep divisions between the followers of Dar and Salahuddin. After this incident he also had refused to participate in then held assembly elections or even to support any party.

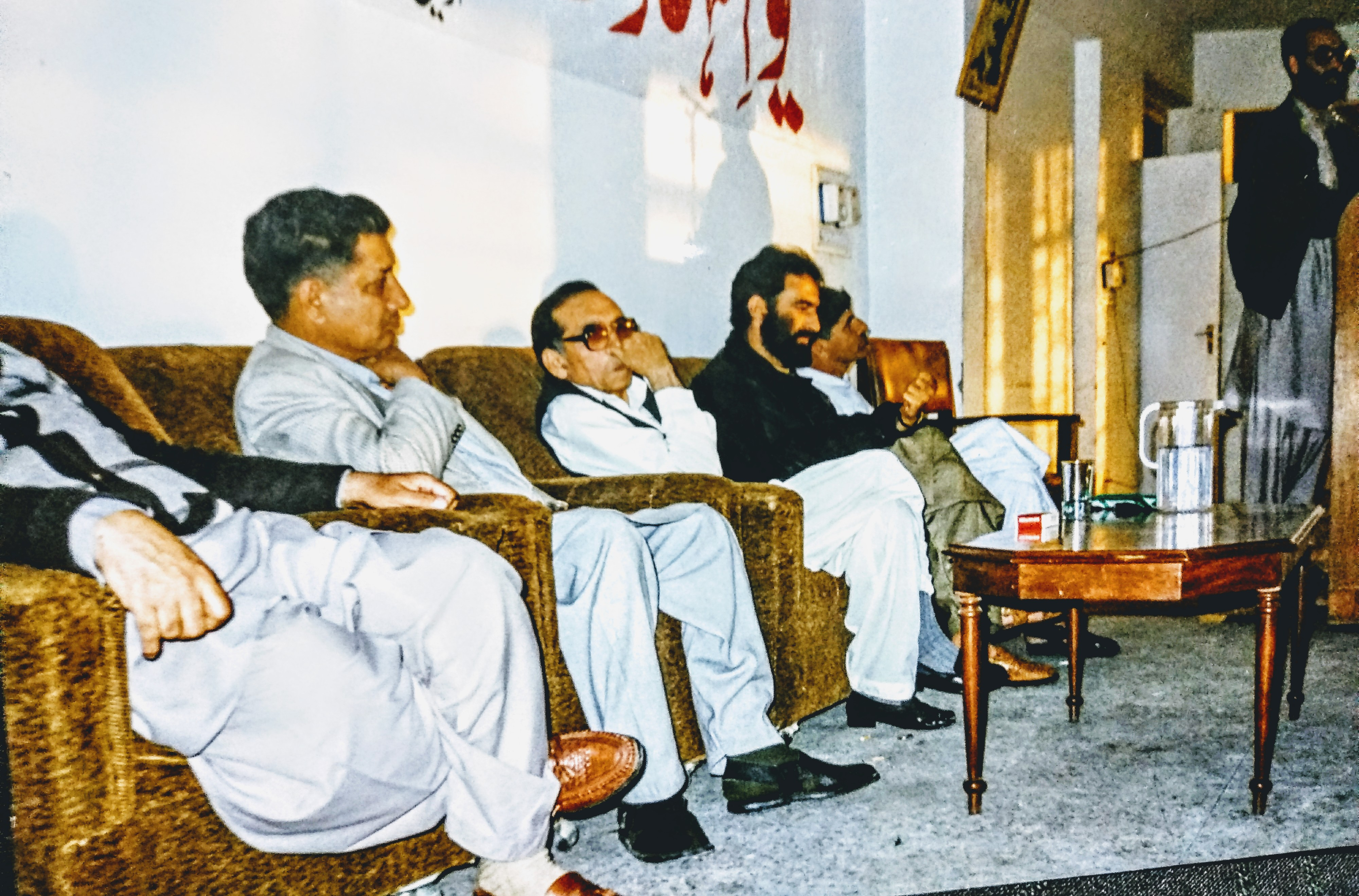
JKLF founder Amanullah Khan with Abdul Majeed Dar

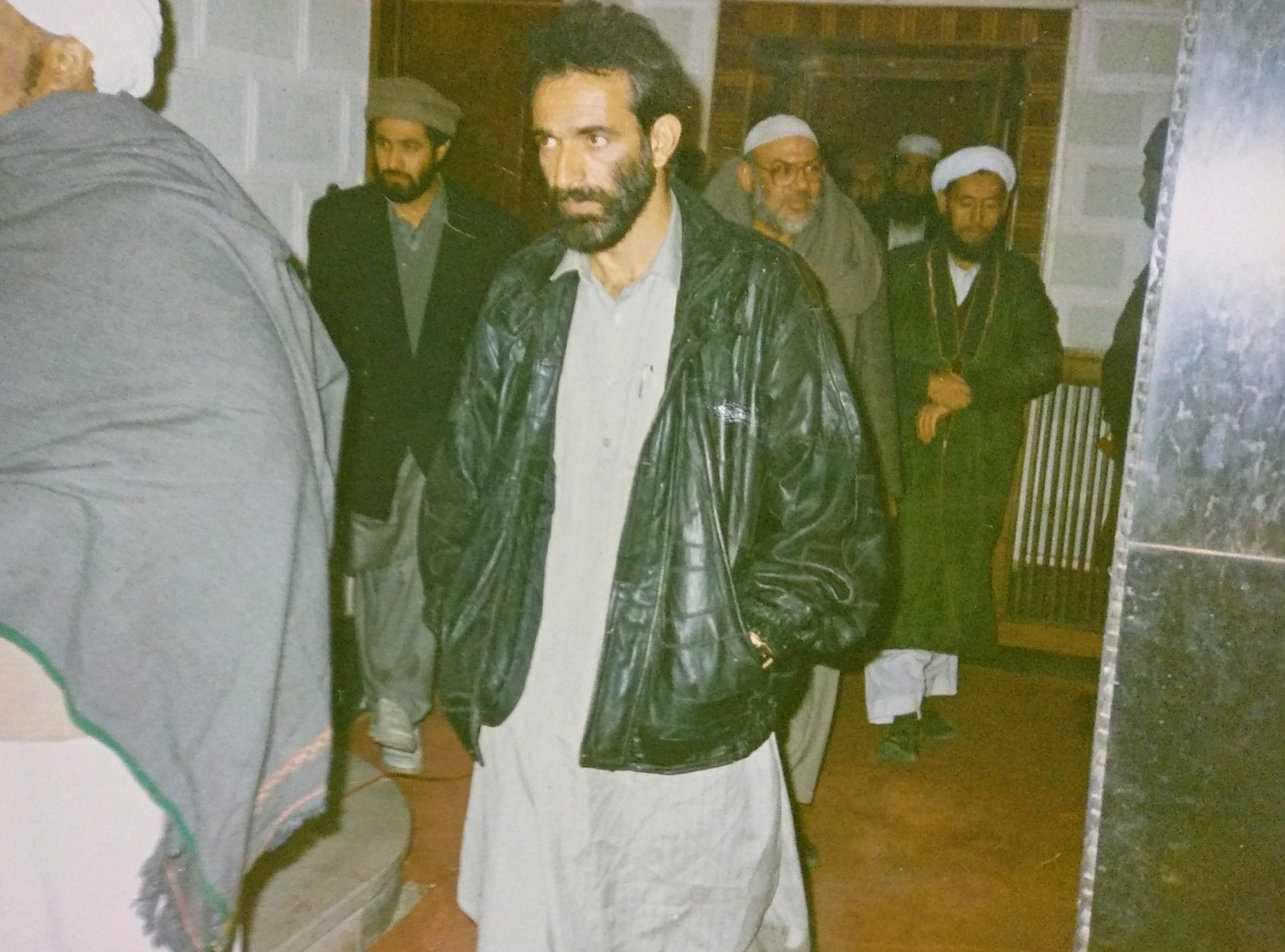
Abdul Majeed Dar after attending a conference

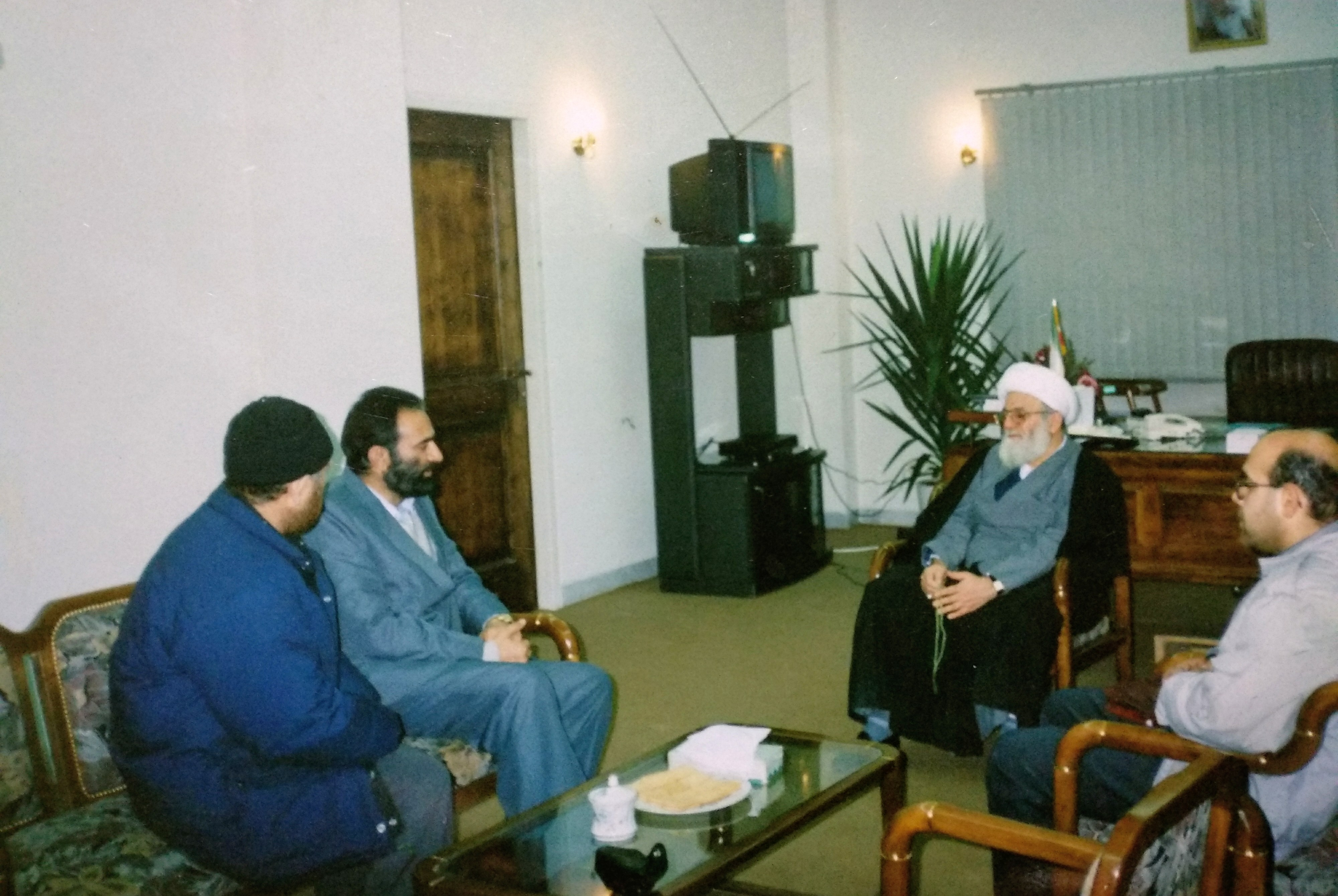
Abdul Majeed Dar in a meeting in Iran

== Assassination ==
In 2001, Hizb commander and Dar's friend, the moderate Abdul Hamid Tantray, was assassinated.

In 1997 April, Bashir Reagan (Bashir Ahmed Regoo) Commander in Chief Hizb and Co-founder Tehreek-e-jihad-e-Islami was assassinated at Sopore.

In 2002 May, Dar was expelled from the Hizb along with Asad Yazdani and Zafar Abdul Fateh . Three weeks later, on 21 May, the moderate Abdul Gani Lone was killed.

In March 2003, as he was coming out of his house in Sopore, Dar was shot dead by two gunmen. No one claimed responsibility for the attack.
