= Al-Badr (Jammu and Kashmir) =

Militant group operating in Jammu and Kashmir, India

- اَلْبَدْرْ
- Al-Badr flag
- Leaders: Arfeen Bhai; Jasniel Rihal; Bahkt Zameen Khan
- Commander: Hamzah Burhan (Chief Operational Commander in Kashmir Valley)
- Dates active: 1998–2022
- Group: United Liberation Front
- Headquarters: Mansehra, Khyber Pakhtunkhwa, Pakistan
- Active regions: Jammu and Kashmir
- Ideology: Separatism; Islamism; Islamic fundamentalism jihadism
- Status: Defunct
- Part of: United Jihad Council

Al-Badr (Arabic: اَلْبَدْرْ, romanized: al-badr, lit. 'the full moon') was an Islamist militant group formerly active in the insurgency in Jammu and Kashmir in India. The group was formed by the Pakistani Inter-Services Intelligence (ISI) in June 1998.

It is believed the group was encouraged by the ISI to operate independently from their previous umbrella group, Hizb-ul-Mujahideen (HM). Prior to the group's separation from HM, they participated in the fighting in Afghanistan in 1990 as part of Gulbuddin Hekmatyar's Hizb-l-Islami (HIG) alongside other anti-Soviet Afghan mujahideen. India and the United States have declared it a terrorist organisation.

== Foundation and separation ==
The group was originally led by Arfeen Bhai, also known as Jannisar or Lukmaan, when it separated in 1998 and is currently led by Bahkt Zameen Khan. In 2002, Zameen declared jihad against the U.S. forces in Afghanistan after being responsible for prior attacks against coalition forces there beginning in 2001. Al-Badr went on further in 2002 to order all women police in the Rajouri District of Kashmir to quit their jobs by mid-January the next year. The group has stated membership in the United Jihad Council (UJC), a coalition of Pakistan-based militants who are active in the Jammu Kashmir region. They have been linked to Jamaat-e-Islami and alleged to have connection with al-Qaeda. The groups stated purpose is to liberate the Indian states of Jammu and Kashmir to be merged with Pakistan. Al-Badr opposes negotiations to end the violence in Kashmir and opposes the Line of Control (LoC) and calls for the strengthening of the jihad.

== Designation as terrorist organisation ==
On 1 July 2002 Al-Badr was banned by India under The Unlawful Activities (Prevention) Act, 2004. In April 2005 State Department of United States Government identified Al-Badr as a terrorist organisation in its list of 40 Designated Foreign Terrorist Organisations.

== Location ==
The Islamic fundamentalist group Al-Badr operates covert Al Badr training camps in Pakistan to train Pakistani civilians to serve as fighters in the conflict in Kashmir. Group has training camps in the Mansehra area of North West Frontier Province (NWFP) in Pakistan, and in Kotli and Muzaffarabad in Azad Kashmir.

In the 1990s, militants trained at al-Badr camp in the use of RDX and C4 explosives. Shaukat Ahmed Khan, the author of an article about the camps, in the Times of India, said he was kidnapped from his home in India by recruiters for the camp; and that when he made clear he wasn't interested in fighting on behalf of Al Badr those running the camp cut out his tongue, and cut off his right hand. He said they spared his life because he was a fellow Muslim.

== Armed activity ==
The group's first armed activities date back to the year 2000, with the death of two foreign members of the group in an enconunter at the outskirts of Srinagar. In later months more encounters between militants and security forces were registered, the most relevant being the one that occurred in Putushahi village, Kupwara district where three militants were killed.

On 28 November 2002, Militants fired a rocket at a state-owned radio station, All India Radio, in Srinagar, made important material damages. It wasn't until 24 February 2005 when armed assailants attacked the Kashmir's Administrative Headquarters in Srinagar, taking hostages about 250 employees, and after a two hours encounter, the attackers where shot dead while three policemen and two civilians were killed in the ensuing operation.

On 27 October 2006, two members of al-Badr were apprehended in Mysore in what Indian police are calling a foiled terror attack. Mohd Ali Hussain and Mohd Fahad were captured carrying a laptop, chemicals often used for creating improvised explosive devices (IEDs), detonators, an AK-47 rifle, a pistol, a cell phone, a digital camera and passports as well as sketches of the state legislature building, 'Vidhan Sabha'. In April 2008, members of Al Badr abducted two policeman in Surigam village, Kupwara district. Days later the officers were found dead at the next day.

It is believed the group has been weakened in recent years due to increased presence of Indian security forces along the Line of Control (LoC) that separates India from Pakistan. Indian security forces gauge the strength of al-Badr to be between 200 with 120 of those forces being foreign mercenaries. Al-Badr is currently one of only two Kashmiri separatist groups that employ suicide squads as a tactic, the other being Lashkar-e-Tayyeba.

On 4 June 2018 Al-Badr took the responsibility for grenade attacks in Shopian and Tahab, Pulwama injuring 23 people, including eight security personnel. On 17 August, other grenade attack were reported in Awantipora, killing a civilian and three more were wounded, being claimed the attack by Al Badr.

On 31 January, militants threw a grenade at security personnel in Anantnag, wounding two CRPF personnel and five civilians.

A year later, members of Al Badr abducted the off duty soldier Shakir Manzoor in Rambhama, Kulgam district, being found dead in August 2020. Al-Badr claimed responsibility for the incident and stated that Manzoor was killed. The body of the soldier were found in advance descomposed state. In 19 August, militants kidnaps Nisar Ahmad Bhat, a Bharatiya Janata Party (BJP) panchayat member, in Khanmoh, Shopian. Days later were found dead and the militants and Al Badr militants said that Nisar Bhat was wrapped in "anti-movement activities". On 5 November 2020 Al Badr militants attacks a J&K Bank branch in Tak Mohalla, Shopian, stealing Rs 60 lakh from a cash va.

The last incident involving the group was in January 2022, when two of its militants were killed in gun fight with the Security Forces in Kashmir. After that incident there have been no reports of the group and the group is considered to be defunct.

== See also ==
- Hizbul Mujahideen
- Lashkar-e-Taiba
- Jaish-e-Mohammed
- Soviet-Afghan war
- Afghan Civil War (1989-1992)
