= Idhayam =

Idhayam (lit. 'heart') may refer to:

- Idhayam (film), a 1991 Indian Tamil-language film
- Idhayam (brand), a brand of sesame oil in India
- Idhayam (2009 TV series), an Indian Tamil-language soap opera
- Idhayam (2023 TV series), an Indian Tamil-language television series

== See also ==
- Hriday, an Indian male given name
