= Asiya Andrabi =

Kashmiri separatist leader

- Born: 1962 (age 63–64)
- Citizenship: Indian
- Education: University of Kashmir, B.Sc Biochemistry; M.A Arabic
- Known for: Founder of Dukhtaran-e-Millat
- Spouse: Ashiq Hussain Faktoo
- Children: 2
- Convictions: 8 Counts (Note: Punishment for being a member of a terrorist gang or organisation; Offence relating to membership of a terrorist organisation; Supporting a terrorist organisation; Promoting enmity between different groups; Imputations prejudicial to national integration; Criminal conspiracy; Statements conducing to public mischief; Conspiracy to commit offences against the State)
- Penalty: Life imprisonment

Details
- Date apprehended: 6 July 2018

Asiya Andrabi is a Kashmiri separatist and founding leader of Dukhtaran-e-Millat. This group is part of the separatist organisation All Parties Hurriyat Conference in the Kashmir Valley. Government of India has declared it as a banned organization. The organisation claims that it aims for the freedom of Kashmir from India.

Until her arrest, she was one of the most important women separatists in the valley. She married Ashiq Hussain Faktoo (a founding member of the Hizbul Mujahideen) in 1990. Her husband has been in jail since 1992, convicted of murder.

Asiya Andrabi had a major role in starting and backing-up various protests in the Kashmir Valley. She is best known for supporting Masarat Alam in the 2010 Kashmir unrest across Kashmir by using her village network of Dukhtaran-e-Millat operatives for rally support. She hoisted the Pakistan flag and sang the Pakistani national anthem in Kashmir on 25 March 2015. Later on, she was booked for that.

On 12 September 2015, she slaughtered a cow and released a video in a bid to defy the ban on sale of beef in Jammu and Kashmir.

On 6 July 2018, Asiya was taken into custody by the National Investigation Agency (NIA).

== Personal life and education ==
Asiya did her BSc in Biochemistry. She did her post graduation in Arabic from Kashmir University. She married Ashiq Hussain Faktoo in 1990. As of 2015, Asiya's husband Faktoo has been in jail for 23 years.

Her younger son, 15-year-old Ahmed bin Qasim, was in class IX in Srinagar while her older son, 22-year-old Muhammad bin Qasim, was living with Andrabi's elder sister in Malaysia in 2015. He was the captain of his university cricket team in 2015. Most of Asiya’s relatives have shifted to Pakistan, Saudi Arabia, England and Malaysia. One of her nephews, Zulqarnain is a captain in the Pakistan Army and a second nephew Irtiyaz-un-Nabi is an aeronautical engineer and lecturer in the International Islamic University, Islamabad.

Andrabi founded her religious beliefs on the teachings of the neo-fundamentalist Jamiat Ahl-e-Hadith, which adheres to the pristine teachings of Islam as to accept everything which is good according to religious text and reject what has not been enjoined by the Islamic Shariah.

== Role in Kashmir politics ==
In pro-Pakistan and activism and separatism, Asiya is senior to Syed Ali Shah Geelani who used to be a member of the Jammu and Kashmir Legislative Assembly in the 1980s when she founded Dukhtaran-e-Millat. In 1982, Asiya was associated with a Madrassa ‘Talimul Quran’ for women which was later turned into Dukhtaran-e-Millat. She started inviting women to read, understand and practice their faith. She was accused of mobilizing women against India.

On inspiration behind formation of "Dukhtaran-e-Millat" she said,

“I was an ambitious girl. I was shocked by this objection on my wish to study outside. But in that disappointed state Mayil Khairabadi’s book 'Khawateen ki Baatein' came to my rescue."

The cover story of the book was of Maryam Jameela, a woman who converts to Islam after studying the religion thoroughly. For Asiya, Jameela’s story was “an eye opener” to practice Islam. Then Asiya turned to be fundamentalist Muslim.

Asiya shot into prominence in the late 1980s when she launched the DeM. However, she jumped into the separatist campaign, which began with the armed insurgency in 1990. In 1993 she was arrested for her anti-national activities, was later released in 1994, and she went underground until 2004. Asiya faced monthly arrests in 2007 to 2009. During the unrest of 2010, she was held for two consecutive years. Along with Masarat Alam (leader of the pro-Pakistan Muslim League), Asiya is believed to be one of the masterminds of the protests of 2010, and they spearheaded the “Quit Jammu and Kashmir” campaign. In 1982, Asiya was associated with a Darsgah Talimul Quran for women which was later turned into Dukhtaran-e-Millet. She started inviting women to read, understand and practice their faith. “This was the aim of my life now. We mobilized to bring Islam in our society,” she added. One of the campaigns of the Darsgah was to demand reserved seats for ladies in local buses while other was to remove posters of nude women across the cinema halls – before the era of Militancy started in the valley. It was only after five years of the formation of her organization, the government objected. “After the elections were held in 1987, darsgahs were locked throughout the valley. When they reached us, our women resisted. I was young and full of passion to resist,” Asiya added. “But police raided my house and office. They told my father that I was mobilizing women against India but he retorted saying that I was just trying to bring social reform,” she recalls.

== Arrests ==
She was arrested on 28 August 2010 by Jammu and Kashmir Police for waging war against India and for inciting violence. She was again arrested on 17 September 2015 in connection with a couple of cases registered against her. The cases included waving Pakistani flags and addressing, via phone, a conference in Pakistan recently. Andrabi, who was not keeping well, as per DeM sources, was sent to Women's Police Station, Rambagh, Srinagar. The court granted her bail, but she was arrested again, and Kashmiris protested against her rearrest.

On 6 July 2018 Asiya and two others connected to her, Nahida Nasreen and Sofi Fahmeeda, were shifted from Srinagar jail and brought to New Delhi by the National Investigation Agency (NIA). They have been booked under various sections of the Indian Penal Code (IPC) for sedition apart from other things. Following this, on 16 July 2018, a Delhi court ordered the three to one month of judicial custody at Tihar Jail.

On 25 March 2026 she got life imprisonment for her conviction in Unlawful Activities (Prevention) Act by a court in Delhi following her arrest in 2018 by National Investigation Agency.

== Criticism ==
- In 2001, she spearheaded a campaign to impose dressing restriction over Kashmiri women, which was criticized by members of the Kashmiri community.

== See also ==
- Kashmir conflict
