= Ashiq Hussain Faktoo =

Kashmiri separatist leader

- Born: 23 March 1967 (age 59); Srinagar, Jammu and Kashmir, India
- Spouse: Asiya Andrabi
- Children: 2
- Conviction: Murder (1 count)
- Penalty: Life imprisonment

Details
- Victims: 1
- Country: India
- State: Jammu and Kashmir
- Date apprehended: February 5, 1993

Qasim Faktoo (also known as Mohammad Qasim) is a Kashmiri separatist and militant, serving life imprisonment for the murder of Hriday Nath Wanchoo. He had been among the earliest members of Hizbul Mujahideen.

== Personal life ==
Faktoo graduated in Commerce from Islamia College Srinagar. He claims to have been denied selection in the state constabulary for failing to pay bribe; this incident motivated him to rally against the state and with the passage of time, become a secessionist. Faktoo is married to Asiya Andrabi, the co-founder of Dukhtaran-e-Millat.

=== Education ===
He earned his PhD in Islamic Studies in 2006, from the prison, and has been since working towards a second PhD in the same field.

== Politics ==
Faktoo's introduction into radical Jihadi secessionist politics was via Mohammad Abdullah Bangroo, a co-founder of Hizbul Mujahideen. In 1990, he was inducted as a spokesman for the group. In 1999, Faktoo launched Muslim Deeni Mahaz, a separate separatist group.

== Assassination of Hriday Nath Wanchoo ==
=== Murder ===
On 5 December 1992, Hriday Nath Wanchoo was assassinated by gunmen at Balgarden in Srinagar; renowned for documenting abuse of human rights by the state, he was among the rare Pandit secessionists and one of the two Hindu ministers in the "government in-absentia" run by Jammu Kashmir Liberation Front. Initial media narrative centered on how the local administration had released two militants in exchange for murdering Wanchoo, one of whom (Zulkar Nan) would be killed in an encounter. Days before his death, Wanchoo had confessed in private, about threats to his life from local administration as well as the security apparatus.

=== Investigation and Prosecution ===
The state government roped in Central Bureau of Investigation (CBI) to investigate the murder; the agency assigned blame on a militant group called "Jamait-ul-Mujahidin" comprising twelve Kashmiri Muslims including Faktoo. He was arrested along with Andrabi, at the Srinagar Airport, upon returning from Delhi. By the time, the investigation concluded, four of the accused had died and five had absconded, leaving only three — Faktoo himself, Mohammad Shafi Khan, (Note: Also known as Shafi Shariati, Khan had been a faculty of Persian at the University of Kashmir. He jumped bail, and remained absconding before being captured in 2011.) and Ghulam Qadir Bhat (Note: Bhat was a constable with the Jammu and Kashmir Police.) — for the trial under Terrorist and Disruptive Activities (Prevention) Act (TADA) before a special court in Jammu. Confessions had been obtained from all of them. Faktoo secured bail from the Jammu and Kashmir High Court in 1999; however, he was arrested in Delhi, upon arrival from London, on charges of carrying RDX and incarcerated.

In July 2001, the TADA Court acquitted Faktoo and others in light of procedural deficiencies in obtaining confessional statements and the absence of any other corroborative evidence. CBI appealed the judgement before the Supreme Court of India; (Note: The TADA act mandates the Supreme Court of India as the sole authority for appeal. In usual cases, the first venue for appeal would have been the Jammu and Kashmir High Court.) in January 2003, a bench of S. N. Variava and B. N. Agrawal disagreed with the court's characterization of the confession and sentenced all to life-imprisonment. Faktoo and Khan filed a review petition but the Court rejected re-adjudication, in September of the same year, after a closed-court hearing. A writ-cum-review petition was filed by Faktoo and Khan in August 2016; however, the Court declined to entertain the petition on procedural grounds.

==== Duration of life-imprisonment ====
In 2007, Faktoo filed a petition before the High Court for premature release since he had already spent fourteen years in jail; accordingly, a Review Board was set up, who recommended his release. The Government disagreed with the recommendation premising upon the gravity of the case but Justice Mansoor Ahmad Mir rejected the explanation, ordering the Government to reassess Faktoo's release within three months; on appeal, a division bench overturned the judgement and held that TADA convicts can only be considered for release upon twenty years of imprisonment. In 2012, having spent twenty years in prison, Faktoo filed a fresh appeal before the Kashmir High Court for premature release; Justice Mir did not find Faktoo's case fit to grant remission. In media interviews, Faktoo claims to have declined multiple release-offers from the Government of India that were conditional on his renouncement of the separatist cause and contesting in local polls.
