= Joint Resistance Leadership =

The Joint Resistance Leadership (JRL) refers to the alliance of top ranked separatist leaders of Kashmir. The resistance leadership includes Yasin Malik, Mirwaiz Umar Farooq and formerly Syed Ali Shah Geelani.

== Activities ==
The Joint Resistance Leadership was formed by Yasin Malik, Mirwaiz Umar Farooq and Syed Ali Shah Geelani in 2016 during the 2016–2017 Kashmir unrest. It has been actively involved in the actions which advocates separation of Kashmir from India. They issued the protest calendars in the Kashmir Valley in the form of shutdowns or marching towards certain areas, and also called for boycott of elections.
