= Syed Salahuddin =

Kashmiri militant leader (born 1946)

Syed Mohammed Yusuf Shah
- Born: 18 February 1946 (age 80); Soibugh, Kashmir and Jammu, British India (now in Jammu and Kashmir, India)
- Education: University of Kashmir
- Spouse: Nafisa
- Children: 7

Mohammad Yusuf Shah (born 18 February or December 1946), commonly known as Syed Salahuddin, is the head of Hizbul Mujahideen, a militant organization operating in Kashmir. He also heads the United Jihad Council, a Pakistan-based conglomeration of jihadist militant groups sponsored by the ISI, with the goal of merging Jammu and Kashmir with Pakistan.

Salahuddin vowed to block any peaceful resolution to the Kashmir conflict, threatened to train more Kashmiri suicide bombers, and vowed to turn the Kashmir valley "into a graveyard for Indian forces." He is listed on the Most Wanted List of India's National Investigation Agency. He is named as a Specially Designated Global Terrorist by the US Department Of State. Salahuddin dismissed the listing as "a joint move by the US, Israel, and India to express their animosity towards Pakistan." Pakistan also dismissed sanction against him. In May 2020, Indian media called an attack on him a warning by Pakistani intelligence.

In August 2020 India's Enforcement Directorate filed a charge-sheet. A court in New Delhi issued a summons in 2021 in relation to a terror funding case. In 2022, India's NIA court ordered charges to be framed against him and others.

== Early life and education ==
Syed Mohammad Yusuf Shah was born in December 1946 in Soibugh, Budgam, a village in the Kashmir Valley. His maternal grandfather Gulla Saheb was a well-known spiritual figure. His father was a farmer.

Yusuf Shah studied under his maternal grandfather's guidance, who took an interest in his education. In high school, Shah composed poetry in English and regularly participated in debate competitions. He finished Intermediate in science with first-class marks. Then he studied arts at the Sri Pratap College, Srinagar and Masters in Political Science at the University of Kashmir, receiving his degree in 1971. Later he became an Islamic teacher at a madrasa or traditional religious seminary.

== Political career ==
=== Jamaat-e-Islami ===
A year after his graduation, Yusuf Shah was appointed as the tehsil chief of Jamaat-e-Islami Kashmir for Budgam. Later he became the chief Nizam-e-Aala for the Jamaat-e-Islami's student wing, Tehreek-e-Talaba. In 1986, he was appointed the district chief of Jamaat for the Srinagar district. According to a biography in the Hindustan Times, he was a notable Islamic scholar and preacher. His Friday sermons at the Exhibition Grounds in Srinagar were popular with the youth. His sermons were contemporary and "had the power to articular what was in our minds", according to Showkat Ahmad Bakhshi of the Islamic Students League.

=== Muslim United Front ===
In 1987, Yusuf Shah contested the J&K assembly election as a candidate of the Muslim United Front, in Srinagar's Amira Kadal constituency. The Islamic Students League campaigned for him and provided the "street power" to counter the cadres of the National Conference. Yasin Malik served as his campaign manager and Ajaz Dar, who had a licensed gun, served as his unofficial bodyguard. There is consensus among the scholars that the election was 'stolen' and Ghulam Mohiuddin Shah of the National Conference was declared as the winner despite Yusuf Shah having had the lead. Yusuf Shah as well as Yasin Malik, along with other supporters, were arrested and put in jail without trial.

== Militancy career ==
=== Hizbul Mujahideen ===
After his arrest for violent protests and release in 1989, he then joined Hizbul Mujahideen founded by Muhammad Ahsan Dar alias "Master" who later parted from Hizbul Mujahideen. He soon took over as the chief of Hizbul Mujahideen and then adopted nom de guerre "Syed Salahuddin", named after Saladin, the 12th century Sunni Muslim political and military leader, who fought in The Third Crusade.

We are fighting Pakistan's war in Kashmir and if it withdraws its support, the war would be fought inside Pakistan

— Syed Salahuddin

In June 2012 in an interview, Hizb-ul-Mujahideen chief Syed Salahuddin accepted that Pakistan had been backing Hizb-ul-Mujahideen for fight in Kashmir. He had declared to start attacking Pakistan if it ceased support of jihadis in Jammu and Kashmir, as they were fighting "Pakistan's war".

=== Designation as a terrorist by U.S. ===
On 26 June 2017 the US Department of State has designated Mohammad Yusuf Shah, also known as Syed Salahuddin, as a Specially Designated Global Terrorist (SDGT) under Section 1(b) of Executive Order (E.O.) 13224, which imposes sanctions on foreign persons who have committed, or pose a significant risk of committing, acts of terrorism that threaten the security of U.S. nationals or the national security, foreign policy, or economy of the United States. As a consequence of this designation, U.S. persons are generally prohibited from engaging in transactions with Salahuddin and all of Salahuddin's property and interests in property subject to United States jurisdiction are blocked. He is designated as an Indian national with a date of birth of 1952 and addresses in Muzaffarabad (the capital of Pak administered Kashmir, Pakistan), Rawalpindi (the Pakistan military headquarters) and Islamabad.

Pakistan rejected the US sanctions against him.

== Personal life ==
=== Family ===
Shah is married, with five sons and two daughters. Writing in 2017, Indian journalist Barkha Dutt, who met him in Rawalpindi, stated that none of Syed Salahuddin's children had been involved in militancy, and that four of them had held government jobs.

Two sons were removed from government offices in Jammu and Kashmir in 2021. In the next month one of his sons, Syed Shakeel Yousuf was arrested, in a terror funding case. Shahid, another son, had been arrested before.

== See also ==
- Kashmir conflict
- Islamic terrorism
- Islamic extremism
- Pakistan and state-sponsored terrorism
- Terrorism in India
- List of terrorist incidents in India

== Bibliography ==
- Bloeria, S. S. (2012), "Conflict overview", in V. R. Raghavan (ed.), Conflicts in Jammu and Kashmir: Impact on Polity, Society and Economy, Vij Books India Pvt Ltd, pp. 15–56, ISBN 978-93-82573-33-3
