= Altaf Ahmad Shah =

Kashmiri separatist (1956–2022)

Personal details
- Born: 1956
- Died: 11 October 2022 (aged 65–66) All India Institute of Medical Sciences
- Party: All Parties Hurriyat Conference

Altaf Ahmad Shah (c. 1956 – 11 October 2022) was a Kashmiri separatist who was a senior leader of the All Parties Hurriyat Conference. Shah was lodged in New Delhi's notorious Tihar Jail since his arrest in 2017, and died in custody. He was the son-in-law of Kashmir Azadi Tehreek leader Syed Ali Geelani.

== Death ==
He died of cancer on 11 October 2022 in All India Institute of Medical Sciences.

Pakistan Prime Minister Shehbaz Sharif commented in a tweet:

Deeply grieved at passing of prominent Kashmiri leader Altaf Shah, son-in-law of Syed Ali Geelani, while in Indian captivity. Modi regime denied him treatment despite knowing he was cancer patient. Custodial killings are norm in Modi's India. My condolences to the bereaved family.
