= Hriday =

Hriday is an Indian masculine given name. Notable people with the name include:

- Hriday Gattani (born 1991), Indian musical artist.
- Hriday Shetty, Indian film director.
- Hriday Nath Wanchoo, (died 1992), Kashmiri communist trade-unionist.
- Hriday Lani, Indian screenwriter.
