= Dukhtaran-e-Millat =

Kashmiri separatist organization

Daughters of the Nation
- Dukhtarān-e-Millat دُخترانِ مِلّت
- Other name: Daughters of the Faith
- Leader: Asiya Andrabi (POW)
- Dates active: 1993 – 2018
- Active regions: Jammu and Kashmir
- Ideology: Islamism; Jihadism; Separatism
- Political position: Far-right
- Status: Defunct

Dukhtaran-e-Millat (transl. Daughters of the Nation; abbreviated as DeM) was an all-women Kashmiri separatist organisation that advocates for jihad to establish Islamic law in Kashmir and for the independence of Jammu and Kashmir from India and accession to Pakistan. It is a front organisation of the Hizbul Mujahideen, a jihadist militant group.

The group was founded in 1987, and is headed by Asiya Andrabi, an "Islamic feminist". During the Kashmir militancy in the early 1990s, the group issued threats to women not wearing a face veil and burqa, some of whom became victims of acid attacks.

The Government of India designated it a terrorist organisation and banned it in 2018.

The group mainly advocated through internet platforms rather than armed activity. On 2018, NIA arrested its leader Asiya Andrabi and her secretary for promoting terrorist activities, after her arrest the group became inactive and is considered as defunct.
