= Jamaat-e-Islami Kashmir =

Political organisation in Jammu and Kashmir

- Abbreviation: JeI-JK
- Founders: Maulana Saaduddin Tarabali Maulana Ghulam Ahmad Ahrar Hakim Ghulam Nabi
- Founded: 1953
- Banned: 28 February 2019
- Headquarters: Srinagar, Jammu & Kashmir, India
- Ideology: Islamism; Islamic fundamentalism Islamic revivalism Social conservatism Separatism; Regionalism
- Political position: Right-wing to Far-right
- Religion: Islam
- International affiliation: Jamaat-e-Islami
- Colors: Green, white, cyan

Party flag

The Jamaat-e-Islami Kashmir or Jamaat-e-Islami Jammu and Kashmir (JIJK) is an Islamic political party based in the city of Srinagar in the Indian-administered territory of Jammu and Kashmir. It is distinct from the Jamaat-e-Islami Hind. The organisation's stated position on the Kashmir conflict is that Kashmir is a disputed territory and the issue must be sorted as per the UN or through tripartite talks between India, Pakistan and representatives of Kashmir.

== Origins ==
=== Reformist roots ===
The JIJK stemmed from Islamic reformist activities in Kashmir in the late nineteenth century, when Jammu and Kashmir was under Dogra rule. One of the pioneers during this phase was the Mirwaiz of Kashmir, Maulana Rasul Shah, who formed the Anjuman Nusrat ul-Islam ("The Society for the Victory of Islam") in 1899 which aimed to impart both modern and Islamic education, and eliminate what were seen as un-Islamic "innovations" (bida'at) and superstitions that had become part of the popular Sufi practices.

The Anjuman activists established the Islamiya High School and the Oriental College in Srinagar. Rashul Shah's successor, Mirwaiz Yusuf Shah, connected Anjuman with other Islamic reformist groups throughout India. He created the Muslim Printing Press, inaugurated two weeklies called al-Islam and Rahnuma, and published the first translation and commentaries of the Quran in the Kashmiri language.

The connections with other Indian Muslim groups brought the Ahl-i-Hadith movement to Kashmir. Sayyed Hussain Shah Batku, began a campaign to eradicate innovations in Kashmiri Muslim society. Although this movement failed due to a lack of mass support, it formed a precursor to JIJK's later reformist agenda.

=== Origins of the Jamaat-e Islami Kashmir ===
Jamaat-e-Islami Kashmir's progenitors came from middle-class families associated with Sufism, who were disillusioned with the secular politics of the National Conference and the Muslim nationalism advocated by the Muslim Conference. They chose to work for Islam advocated by the Islamist ideologue Maulana Maududi, who founded Jamaat-e-Islami in India.

The early pioneers included Sa'aduddin Tarabali, who came from the family of Sufi mystic Ahmad Sahib Tarabali. Tarabali influenced many Kashmiri men in Shopian, then a political hub, including Maulana Ghulam Ahmad Ahrar, a member of the Islamic reformist group Majlis-i-Ahrar, who also came from a family of Sufi connections, and Hakim Ghulam Nabi of Pulwama, who came from a family of Pirs. These men were dissatisfied with the contemporary religious practices in Kashmir which they saw as un-Islamic and were also dissatisfied with secular Kashmiri leaders such as Sheikh Abdullah who were deemed to be insufficiently Islamic.

The first all-India ijtema of Jamaat-e-Islami was held at Pathankot in 1945, which was attended by four Kashmiris. Sa'aduddin, Qari Saifuddin and Muhammad Hussain Chishti established the Jamaat in Kashmir and thus Sa'aduddin became the amir, a position he held till 1985.

Jamia Masjid in Srinagar became the location of Jamaat's weekly meetings as the group distributed Maududi's literature. The Jamaat expanded its presence from Srinagar to other places in the Valley as Qari Saifuddin and Ghulam Rasul Abdullah undertaking travels to spread the Jamaat's message. The Jamaat's first large ijtema was organised in Srinagar in late 1945 which was attended by between seventy and a hundred people including government servants, youth and traders.

== History ==
After the Partition of India, the Jamaat activists based in Srinagar, favoured Jammu and Kashmir to join Pakistan while at that time most Kashmiri Muslims rallied behind Sheikh Abdullah, who was pro-India. The pro-Pakistan constituency provided a base of support for the Jamaat. Soon afterwards, Jammu and Kashmir joined India, spurred by the Pakistani tribal invasion, and Sheikh Abdullah was appointed as the prime minister of Kashmir.

During 1947–1952, an increasing number of educated youth and low and middle-ranking government servants came to be attracted to the Jamaat, which established a number of schools and expanded its activities in the media and mosques.

In 1952 the Jama'at-i-Islami Hind decided to separate its Kashmir branch because of the disputed nature of Jammu and Kashmir. Under the leadership of two committed Jamaat members, Maulana Ahrar and Ghulam Rasul Abdullah, the Jamaat in Kashmir drafted its own constitution which was passed and accepted in November 1953. In October 1954, at a special meeting held in Barzalla, Srinagar, Sa'aduddin was elected as the President of the organisation by a large majority. The Central Advisory Committee held its first meeting two months later.

Sa'aduddin spread the work of the JIJK from Kashmir Valley, where it had until then been concentrated, to Jammu. Sa'aduddin was particularly concerned about the Muslims of Jammu as they had suffered communal violence abetted by the Maharaja during Partition and suffered from the feeling of being an insecure minority thereafter. He warned his colleagues in Kashmir that Jammu Muslims needed to be helped otherwise they could be Hinduised in terms of culture and faith. The Jamaat expanded in size considerably in the 1950s. The National Conference's autocratic rule and the perception that it had sold Kashmir's interests to India caused a disillusion with that organisation among Kashmiri youth began enlisting as Jamaat members or came to sympathise with it. As opposition to Indian rule mounted, due to India's failure to uphold its promises to the Kashmiri people, growing Hindu chauvinism, threats to Kashmiri Muslim identity, rigged elections, the failure of the state to provide jobs to an increasing number of educated youth in the public sector and the continued domination of the administrative service by Kashmiri Pandits the Jamaat found an increase in its support. However, the mounting support for the Jamaat was also contributed in part to its advocacy of piety and social Islamisation programs.

The Jamaat in particular appealed to lower middle class young men from towns such as Srinagar, Baramulla and Sopore and were typically from the first generation of educated members of their families. This class was disillusioned with the popular Sufism of Kashmiri shrines which they came to see as 'un-Islamic' and also found in the Jamaat a medium for political assertion. The Jamaat's advocacy for both modern and religious education and its community work also appealed to sections of the new generation. The Jamaat sought also to address contemporary political issues. The JIJK became part of debates concerning unity of Muslims, the growing spread of alcohol, increasing corruption in the state's administration, providing fertilizers to farmers, Kashmir's disputed status and the militant Hindu agitation in Jammu for the state's full integration with India.

Despite the organisation's growth in the 1950s the group also faced opposition from several sections of Kashmiri Muslim society. Many Sufis associated the group with the 'worldwide nexus' of Wahhabis and considered the Jamaat a threat to their own interests. Despite sharing a common background with the Ahl-i-Hadith movement, the Jamaat encountered opposition with them too as the Ahl-i-Hadith feared that the Jamaat would win over its own support base. The response of the Jamaat to its opponents was tactful.

From the 1950s onwards Jamaat attempted to influence Kashmiri opinion through its extensive works in the education sphere and its participation in elections. The Jamaat received funds from donations, members' fees and properties endowed to the organisation by members and sympathisers. By the 1970s the JIJK became a powerful organisation with a membership presence all over the state, particularly in the Kashmir Valley. But the organisation has still remained a largely Kashmiri Muslim group. The JIJK's stronger presence in Anantnag district was due to the high literacy rates in the district, demonstrating the Jamaat's appeal to the educated class. The weaker presence in Srinagar was explained by the presence of the traditional Sufi leadership in that city.

The JIJK came to conflict with the Indian state throughout the 1960s since it questioned the legality of India's administration of Jammu and Kashmir and demanded that the matter be solved by a plebiscite in accordance with UN Resolutions.

In December 1963 when a holy relic was stolen from the Hazratbal shrine in Srinagar and the movement demanding the relic's recovery turned into a popular agitation for freedom and the demand of self-determination. During this time JIJK participated in voicing this demand and also at the same time prevented Hindu-Muslim communal violence. The Awami Action Committee was set up, where Qari Saifuddin represented the Jamaat, to continue this struggle. The Indian authorities arrested the leaders of the Committee including the Qari. In addition to the event of the relic's theft, corruption, unemployment and poverty in the state contributed to Kashmiri hostility to Indian rule. Due to the JIJK's strident and consistent challenge to the Indian control of the state it earned increasing support from growing numbers of Kashmiri Muslims.

== Views on Sufism ==
The Jamaat's stance to Sufism was relatively moderate compared to that of the Ahl-i-Hadith movement and it even chose to operate within the existing Sufi frameworks to present its teachings as the true teaching of Sufism untainted by added layers of superstition. Qari Saifuddin was himself the chairman of the famous Sufi shrine at Khanyar, Srinagar and translated the works of the fourteenth century Sufi saint Nuruddin Nurani. Sa'aduddin translated Mir Sayyed Ali Hamadani's works from Persian to Urdu and wrote works re-interpreting Sufi practices and ideas to align with the Jamaat's concerns about the proper observance of Shariah. However, despite its relatively moderate stance towards the Sufi shrines, in contrast to the stance of the Ahl-i-Hadith movement, the Jamaat found it could not get popular acceptance due to its attitude against the shrines as it came to be charged of being 'Wahhabi' and 'anti-Sufi'.

== Educational works ==
Sa'aduddin Tarabali realised the importance of the education sector in Kashmir and the organisation was one of the first non-governmental groups to work in this sector. The JIJK established a number of schools, including good ones where both modern and Islamic disciplines were taught. Part of the reason JIJK felt a need to establish its own schools was the feeling that the Indian educational system was threatening Kashmir's Islamic culture.

Eventually the JIJK established a presence among teachers and students in colleges in the Kashmir Valley. In 1977 the JIJK created the Islami Jamiat-i-Talaba (The Islamic Union of Students) for student members and sympathisers.

In the early 2010s it was estimated that the JIJK ran at least 300 schools with 10,000 teachers and 100,000 students.

== Electoral politics ==
Although the JIJK questioned Indian control over the state it adopted a flexible attitude towards participating in the elections which were held under the framework of the Indian Constitution. This was a tactical compromise as JIJK wanted to employ democratic means to expand its influence and prepare for the gradual acquisition of the government machinery. JIJK justified its participation in the elections as a means to influence the Indian government to resolve the Kashmir dispute.

The JIJK fielded some of its members as independent candidates in the local panchayat elections. It also sponsored some candidates for the 1969 local panchayat elections, which were held on a non-party basis, and some of the sponsored contestants managed to be elected. The emergence of the JIJK as a serious oppositional force to the National Conference reflected increasing alienation of common Kashmiris from the National Conference due to its autocratism and the perception that it had collaborated with India to decrease Kashmir's autonomy.

The JIJK participated in the 1971 general elections and expected to win some seats. But it failed to win any with charges of widespread rigging. The Central Advisory Committee then decided that JIJK would contest the 1972 elections to the State Assembly. It aimed, through participating in the elections, to challenge the notion that politics and religion are separate. Initially JIJK wished to contest all the State Assembly seats but due to financial constraints contested only 22. Despite its expectation that it would do well it failed to get as many seats as it had hoped due to massive rigging. It won only five seats. The JIJK complained that some of its members were harassed after the elections.

The JIJK still saw its electoral participation in a positive light since it expanded their message to a wider audience and successful JIJK candidates took an active role in the State Assembly by opposing proposed un-Islamic laws, arguing in favour of Islamic alternatives and raising the question of Jammu and Kashmir's disputed status, arguing that India had failed to conduct a plebiscite in Kashmir as it had promised. In 1975 the JIJK strongly opposed the Indira-Sheikh Accord and considered it a gross violation of UN Resolutions on the Kashmir issue. The group won only one seat in the 1977 election.

Although the 1970s proved to be a phase where the Jamaat's political strength grew the organisation suffered in 1979. In April 1979 General Zia ul Haq seized power and hanged Zulfiqar Ali Bhutto. Common perception was that the Jamaat-i-Islami of Pakistan was behind this event. Consequently, there were massive anti-Jamaat agitations all over Kashmir. JIJK offices and its members' houses came under attack. These riots lasted three days and property worth 400 million rupees, belonging to the Jamaat and its members, were either destroyed or looted.

The Jamaat believed that behind these attacks on it were the leftists who were using Bhutto's hanging to discredit the Jamaat in the Kashmiri society. The Jamaat also blamed some religious leaders opposed to the Jamaat of instigating people to attack it.

The Jamaat later contested the 1983 State Assembly election but failed to win a single of the 26 seats it had contested because of alleged massive rigging.

The Jamaat contested the elections in 1987 as part of the Muslim United Front which was fought on the platform of advocating the establishment of rule by the Quran and Sunnah. These elections were rigged. On 15 May, 2024, Jamaat-e-Islami Kashmir addressed a press conference and said that they are willing to contest the Legislative Elections in Jammu and Kashmir, if ban on the organization is lifted. On August 25, the Majlis-e-Shura (Consultative Body) of JeI held a meeting at Nowgam, Srinagar and decided to field its members as independent candidates after the Election Commission of India announced the polls, first time in a decade, for UT of J&K. This was the re-entry of Jamaat in electoral arena, after 37 years. The Jamaat fielded 3 of its members, namely, Dr. Talat Majid, Sayar Ahmad Reshi and Nazir Ahmad Bhat as independents in Pulwama, Kulgam and Devsar constituencies respectively and is fielding more than 10 of its members in the 2nd and 3rd phase of the UT election, though it did not win any seat.

== Separatism and insurgency ==
Increasing anti-Indian protests took place in Kashmir in the 1980s. The Soviet-Afghan jihad and the Islamic Revolution in Iran were becoming sources of inspiration for large numbers of Kashmiri Muslim youth. The state authorities tried to talk to them on the economic demands but they resorted to violence. Both the pro-Independence Jammu and Kashmir Liberation Front (JKLF) and the pro-Pakistan Islamist groups including JIJK mobilised the fast growing anti-Indian sentiment among the Kashmiri population.

Although the Jamaat held the view that Kashmir was disputed territory it continued until the late 1980s to insist on using talks, rather than armed insurrection, to resolve the issue. In 1979 Qari Saifuddin said that the JIJK 'has always desired that the Kashmir issue should be resolved through constitutional means and dialogue'.

In 1980 the Indian Supreme Court sentenced JKLF leader Maqbool Butt to death and large protests took place in Kashmir against this decision. While Butt came to be considered a hero by the Kashmiri masses the JIJK urged restraint. JIJK leaders believed that Butt should be allowed to defend himself but at the same time asserted that they were bound by the Constitution and wanted to resolve issues through democratic methods. The Jamaat disapproved of Maqbool's resort to arms and did not call him a 'shahid' (martyr) although it did express reserved admiration for him.

In 1986 some members of the JKLF crossed over to Pakistan to receive arms training but the JIJK, which saw Kashmiri nationalism as contradicting Islamic universalism and its own desire for merging with Pakistan, did not support the JKLF movement. As late as that year, Jamaat member Syed Ali Shah Geelani, who later became a supporter of Kashmir's armed revolt, urged that the solution for the Kashmir issue be arrived at through peaceful and democratic means.

By 1990 the JIJK and many other Kashmiri groups had changed their position of advocating peaceful struggle and joined with JKLF in advocating the route of an armed anti-Indian revolt. Reasons for this included increasing repression by the Indian state and the realisation that if it did not join the armed struggle it could lose its popularity to the JKLF. The Jamaat was banned in 1990. The Falah-e-Aam Trust was created in 1988 to run JEI schools following a ban on the JIK. Students from the schools were often recruited for arms training in Pakistan and "infiltrated back to carry on their subversive activity" (according to J&K Insights quoted by Terrorism Research and Analysis Consortium). In 1989 Hizbul Mujahideen (HM) was adopted as the group's "militant wing" allegedly under the influence of Pakistan's Inter-Services Intelligence. In 1990 a chief commander of HM pronounced HM the "sword arm of the Jammat".

By the mid-1990s Pakistani support to the JKLF ceased and the Pakistani support was increasingly given to pro-Pakistan Islamist groups including the Jamaat which sidelined the Kashmiri nationalist groups. The participation in the armed struggle proved costly for the Jamaat. The organisation lost hundreds, possibly thousands, of members in counter-insurgency operations by Indian security forces. Consequently, the Jamaat is calling for a political method to resolve the Kashmir issue.

== Ban ==
In February 2019 the organisation was banned for a five-year period under the Unlawful Activities (Prevention) Act. The notification stated that the Jamaat was in close touch with militant organisations and was expected to "escalate its subversive activities" including attempts to carve an Islamic State out of the territory of India. Prior to the ban, 300 members of the organisation, including its leaders, were arrested under preventive detention laws and raids were conducted. The Jamaat leaders were said to have been "mystified" by the crackdown and claimed that the organisation's work was "in the open".

The tribunal constituted by the Home Ministry upheld the ban, after examining substantial number of documents and depositions by witnesses. The judge agreed that the organisation had been indulging in unlawful activities that threatened the sovereignty and territorial integrity of India. The Inspector General of Police submitted an affidavit stating that the organisation had begun to follow directions from Jamaat-e-Islami Pakistan, had patronised the banned terror organisation Hizbul Mujahideen, and was intrinsically linked with the United Jihad Council, the Pakistan-based umbrella organisation of terrorist outfits.

On 27 February 2024, the Ministry of Home Affairs in India extended the ban on Jamaat-e-Islami (JeI) Jammu and Kashmir for five more years. The organisation was declared an "unlawful association" under the Unlawful Activities (Prevention) Act (UAPA) 1967, citing activities deemed prejudicial to national security and territorial integrity. The Indian government provided a list of 47 cases registered against the Jamaat-e-Islami Jammu and Kashmir (JeI J&K) organization. This included an National Investigation Agency case highlighting the organisation's collection of funds intended to promote violent and secessionist activities. The NIA chargesheet further revealed that these funds were allegedly used by operatives of terrorist groups, such as Hizbul Mujahideen and Lashkar-e-Taiba, to incite public unrest and spread communal tension. The government asserted that JeI J&K maintains close ties with militant groups and actively supports extremism and militancy within Jammu & Kashmir, as well as other parts of India.

== Bibliography ==
- Sikand, Yoginder (July 2002), "The Emergence and Development of the Jama'at-i-Islami of Jammu and Kashmir (1940s–1990)", Modern Asian Studies, 36 (3): 705–751, doi:10.1017/S0026749X02003062, ISSN 1469-8099, S2CID 145586329
