= Hriday Nath Wanchoo =

Kashmiri communist trade-unionist

Hriday Nath Wanchoo (d. 1992) was a Kashmiri communist trade-unionist, who is remembered for ensuring the socioeconomic upliftment of sanitation workers and documenting abuse of human rights by the state.

== Career and politics ==
Wanchoo was employed as the Khilafarzi officer in Srinagar municipality. In May 1992, he was inducted as a member of the Central Committee of the "Kashmir Liberation Council", established by Ghulam Qadir Wani and others for the cause of achieving Kashmiri Independence from India.

== Death ==
Wanchoo was assassinated by "unidentified gunmen" on 5 December 1992. Local activists accused the government of having released two militants in exchange for an extrajudicial execution, one of whom would be killed in an "encounter"; Human Rights Watch noted Wanchoo's murder to fit into the state's brutal suppression of conversations on human rights. Days before his death, Wanchoo had confessed in private, about threats to his life from local administration as well as the security apparatus.

=== CBI Investigation ===
Within days, the state government roped in Central Bureau of Investigation (CBI) to investigate the murder who concluded a local militant group called "Jamait-ul-Mujahidin" — comprising twelve Kashmiri Muslims — to have planned the assassination. However, by the time the investigation concluded, four of the accused had died and five had absconded, leaving only three — Ashiq Hussain Faktoo, a budding separatist; Mohammad Shafi Khan, a faculty member of the University of Kashmir specialising in Persian; Ghulam Qadir Bhat, a constable with the Jammu and Kashmir Police — for trial under Terrorist and Disruptive Activities (Prevention) Act before a special court in Jammu. Confessions were obtained from all of them.

=== Judiciary ===
In July 2001, the TADA Court acquitted Faktoo and others in light of procedural deficiencies in obtaining confessional statements and the absence of any other corroborative evidence. CBI appealed the judgement before the Supreme Court of India (Note: The TADA act mandates the Supreme Court of India as the sole authority for appeal. In usual cases, the first venue for appeal would have been the Jammu and Kashmir High Court.) and in January 2003, S. N. Variava disagreed with the court's characterization of the confession, sentencing all to life-imprisonment. Faktoo and Khan filed a review petition but the Court rejected re-adjudication, in September of the same year, after a closed-court hearing.

The judgement appears to be unconvincing among scholars; Seema Kaji and Sumantra Bose continue to suspect the Indian state to have had a role in the murder.
