= Fazl-ul-Haq Qureshi =

Kashmiri separatist leader

Fazal-Haq Qureshi is a Kashmiri separatist leader, and was a senior leader of the All Parties Hurriyat Conference (APHC).

On December 4, 2009, he survived an assassination attempt.
