= Syed Ali Shah Geelani =

Kashmiri separatist leader (1929–2021)

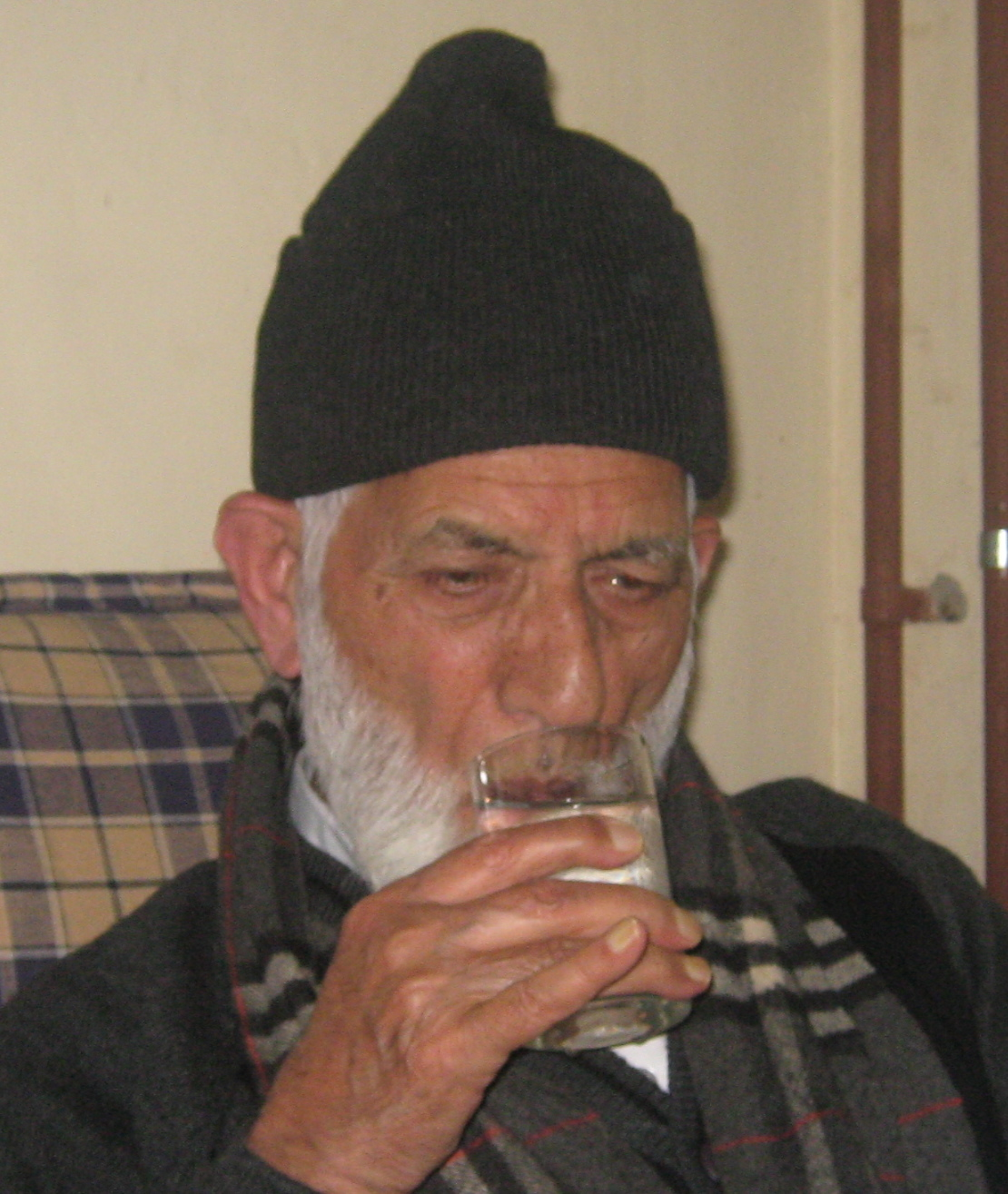
- Geelani in 2009

Chairman of All Parties Hurriyat Conference
- In office 1998 – 20 July 2000
- Preceded by: Mirwaiz Umar Farooq
- Succeeded by: Abdul Ghani Bhat

Chairman of All Parties Hurriyat Conference (Geelani faction)
- In office 13 September 2003 – 29 June 2020
- Preceded by: Masarat Alam Bhat (interim)
- Succeeded by: Masarat Alam Bhat (interim)

Chairman of Tehreek-e-Hurriyat
- In office 12 October 2004 – 19 March 2018
- Preceded by: position established
- Succeeded by: Ashraf Sehrai

Member of Jammu and Kashmir Legislative Assembly
- In office 1972–1977
- In office 1977–1982
- In office 1987–1990
- Constituency: Sopore

Personal details
- Born: 29 September 1929 Zoori Munz, Jammu and Kashmir, British India
- Died: 1 September 2021 (aged 91) Srinagar, Jammu and Kashmir
- Citizenship: Indian
- Party: JKNC (until c. 1952); JIJK (1953–2010); Hurriyat (2004–2018)
- Spouse(s): Unknown (died 1968) Jawahira Begum (before 2021)
- Children: 6
- Education: Adib 'Alim; Adib-i-Fazil; Munshi Fazil
- Occupation: Kashmiri separatist leader
- Awards: Nishan-e-Pakistan (2020)

Syed Ali Shah Geelani (29 September 1929 – 1 September 2021) was an Islamist, pro-Pakistan Jihadist, Kashmiri-separatist leader in the Indian union territory of Jammu and Kashmir; he is regarded as the father of the Kashmiri jihad.

He was a member of Jamaat-e-Islami Kashmir since 1953, and was regarded as one of its most significant leaders. Geelani was also a three-time Member of the Legislative Assembly from the Sopore Assembly constituency, elected on a Jamaat-e-Islami ticket in 1972, 1977 and in 1987. He left Jamaat in 2004 and founded Tehreek-e-Hurriyat, which became the leading organisation in a separate "Geelani faction" of the All Parties Hurriyat Conference (APHC). Geelani served as the chairman of this faction until he quit it in June 2020.

== Early life ==
Geelani was born in 1929 in a village called Zurimanz, in the Bandipora tehsil (Bandipore district) of Baramulla district in North Kashmir, into a Syed family. (Note: Abdul Hakeem states the birth place as the Khonus village, at the edge of Sopore.) He was the son of a landless labourer in the canals department. He studied in a madrasa attached to the Wazir Khan Mosque. Afterwards, he enrolled in the Oriental College, Lahore, where he completed Adib 'Alim, a course in Islamic theology. In 1947, he returned to Kashmir and obtained Adib-i-Fazil and Munshi Fazil from University of Kashmir.

== Career ==
After returning to Kashmir, Geelani became active in the Jammu & Kashmir National Conference. He was appointed the secretary of the party unit in Zurimanj. In 1946, during the Quit Kashmir movement of the National Conference, he came in contact with Maulana Masoodi, the general secretary of the National Conference, who took a liking to him and made him a reporter to the party newspaper Akhbar-i-Khidmat.

Maulana Masoodi also sponsored further studies for Geelani, who completed an adib-i-fazil course in Urdu and other courses in Persian and English. After this, he took a job as a school teacher, first at Pathar Masjid and later at Rainawari in Srinagar. Here he came in contact with Saaduddin Tarabali, a follower of the Jamaat-e-Islami founder Maulana Abul A'la Maududi. Maududi advocated a hardline Islamist ideology, whereby Islam had to be the foundation of the entire political order. Geelani had borrowed a book of Maududi from the local book store, which made a deep impression upon him. He was to later say, Maududi had "beautifully.. expressed the feelings that lay deep down in my own heart". The National Conference headquarters, Mujahid Manzil, where Geelani apparently stayed, soon began to be seen as "a den of Pakistanis".

Geelani was soon moved out of Srinagar, and he came to work in the Intermediate College in Sopore. He stayed in this position for six years. During this time, he was reading the literature of Jamaat-e-Islami and conveying its contents to his students in lectures. He also addressed congregations in mosques. He had become a full-fledged member of Jamaat in 1952.

=== Electoral politics ===
Geelani entered into electoral politics ahead of the 1971 Indian general election. Geelani had claimed that the Jamaat-e-Islami wanted to use it as an opportunity to spread its ideology, keep the Kashmir issue in prominence and protect basic and fundamental rights of the people. Geelani contested as an independent candidate but lost to Syed Ahmed Aga, with the Jamaat alleging ballot-rigging.

He participated in the 1972 legislative assembly election from Sopore. He won from the seat in that year and again in the 1977 legislative assembly election. He was however defeated in the 1983 election due to the sympathy wave generated for the Jammu & Kashmir National Conference by the death of Sheikh Abdullah. Geelani also contested the 1977 Indian general election as an independent candidate due to the banning of Jamaat in 1975, but lost to Abdul Ahad Vakil.

In the 1987 legislative assembly election, Jamaat-e-Islami candidates including Geelani participated under a coalition of parties called the Muslim United Front (MUF). Geelani won the seat from Sopore, but was expelled from the MUF in 1988. Geelani resigned as an MLA in August 1989 due to alleged widespread ballot rigging in the 1987 election.

=== Separatist leader ===
Geelani was viewed as a key separatist leader in Kashmir. Omar Abdullah, former Chief Minister of Jammu and Kashmir, blamed Geelani for the rise in militancy and bloodshed in Kashmir, while his father and former Union Minister Farooq Abdullah urged Geelani to follow a path which would "save Kashmiri people from further destruction".

He was one of the founding members of the All Parties Hurriyat Conference (APHC), an alliance of Kashmiri social and political organisations who supported a referendum for Kashmir, in 1993 and was the initial choice for the position of its chairman. Mirwaiz Umar Farooq was however chosen instead due to the secular organisations forming majority of the alliance. Geelani became the chairman in 1998, and was replaced by Abdul Ghani Bhat on 20 July 2000.

He also criticised the Jammu and Kashmir People's Conference for fielding proxy candidates in the 2002 assembly election and sought its removal, threatening to launch his own party. In May 2003, the Jamaat-e-Islami removed him as its representative from the executive body of Hurriyat in order to counter hardliners in the organisation. In August 2003 it removed him from the position of head of its political bureau, appointing Ashraf Sehrai in his place.

The appointment of Mohammad Abbas Ansari as chairman of Hurriyat precipitated a crisis in the organisation and it split in September 2003. Geelani formed his own faction within the Hurriyat Conference, called the "All Parties Hurriyat Conference (G)", in September 2003 and was elected as its chairman for three years, replacing its interim chairman Masarat Alam Bhat. It consists of 24 parties. In 2006 he was re-elected for a term of three years despite expressing his desire to step down owing to ill health. In 2015, he was appointed as the lifetime chairman of the faction.

In February 2004, he sought to form his own party. The Jamaat-e-Islami prohibited him from doing so and suspended him. In response, he dropped the idea for launching the party and tried to take over the leadership of the organisation. Bowing to the pressure, the Jamaat readmitted him in August 2004 and allowed him to form his own party. In the same month he founded the Tehreek-e-Hurriyat and was elected as its chairman for three years in October 2004. He was re-elected to the position for three year-terms consecutively in 2007, 2010 and 2013. In 2017 he was given a year-long extension after the party failed to hold regular elections in 2016 due to the 2016–2017 Kashmir unrest.

Jammat-e-Islami removed Geelani from its advisory council in 2005. It later started distancing itself from him and stated that he did not represent them, but the Tehreek-e-Hurriyat. In April 2010 it temporarily expelled him from the organisation due to him defending the freedom of the author of his biography Qaid-e-Inqilab – Ek Tareekh, Ek Tehreek over making derogatory remarks against the party, but later restored him as a basic member (rukun).

Geelani had called for numerous general strikes or shutdowns, in response to the deaths of unnamed suspected militants, local militants and death of civilians in Kashmir.

Geelani had appealed to people of Kashmir to boycott the 2014 legislative assembly elections completely, not accepting the proposals for self-rule or autonomy that had been offered by the People's Democratic Party and the then ruling National Conference. Despite repeated boycott appeals, the elections had record voter turnout of more than 65%, which was the highest in 25 years of history of the state. After record voting percentage in Kashmir, Geelani, along with other separatists, were criticised by Indian media for misleading people of Kashmir and for not representing true sentiments of Kashmiri people.

Geelani received the invitation to participate in the annual meeting of the foreign ministers of member states of the Organisation of Islamic Cooperation (OIC) and the Kashmir Contact Group to be held in New York from 27 September 2015. After the killing of Burhan Muzaffar Wani and the unrest that followed it, to restore normalcy in Kashmir, Geelani sent a letter to United Nations listing six confidence-building measures.

In March 2018, Geelani announced his resignation as chairman of the Tehreek-e-Hurriyat citing ill health, being replaced with Ashraf Sehrai. However he remained the chairman of his faction of the All Parties Hurriyat Conference. In June 2020 he announced his resignation from the faction, accusing it of nepotism and corruption, in addition to misinterpreting his speeches and taking decisions without him. It however refused to accept his resignation and did not name a new chairman until after his death.

=== Sedition charge ===
On 29 November 2010, Geelani, along with writer Arundhati Roy, Maoist ideologue Varavara Rao and three others, was charged under "sections 124A (sedition), 153A (promoting enmity between classes), 153B (imputations, assertions prejudicial to national integration), 504 (insult intended to provoke breach of peace) and 505 (false statement, rumour circulated with intent to cause mutiny or offence against public peace...) to be read with Section 13 of the Unlawful Activities Prevention Act of 1967". The charges, which carried a maximum sentence of life imprisonment, were the result of a self-titled seminar they gave in New Delhi, "Azadi-the Only Way" on 21 October, at which Geelani was heckled.

== Personal life ==
Geelani lived in Hyderpora, Srinagar. He had two sons; Nayeem and Naseem, and four daughters; Anisha, Farhat Jabeen, Zamshida, and Chamshida. Anisha and Farhat are Geelani's daughters from his second marriage. Nayeem and his wife are both doctors who used to live and practise medicine in Rawalpindi, Pakistan, but they returned to India in 2010. Geelani's younger son, Naseem works as a Senior scientist at Sher-e-Kashmir University of Agricultural Sciences and Technology in Srinagar. Geelani's grandson Izhaar is a crew member in a private airline in India. Geelani's daughter Farhat is a madani teacher in Jeddah, Saudi Arabia and her husband is an engineer there. Geelani's other grandchildren are studying in leading schools of India. His cousin Ghulam Nabi Fai is presently in London. Ruwa Shah, daughter of Kashmiri separatist Altaf Ahmad Shah (SAS Geelani's son-in-law) is a journalist. She previously worked as a journalist in India with organisations including the Al Jazeera, IANS and The Indian Express.

=== Health issues, passport suspension and house arrest ===
Geelani's passport was seized in 1981 due to accusations of "anti-India" activities. With the exception of his Hajj pilgrimage in 2006, he has not been allowed to leave India. He was diagnosed with renal cancer, and advised treatment from abroad in the same year. On the then Indian Prime Minister Manmohan Singh's intervention, the government returned Geelani's passport to his son. In 2007, his condition worsened, although in the early stages of the cancer, it was life-threatening and surgery was advised. Geelani was set to travel to either the UK or the United States. However, his visa request was rejected by the American government citing his violent approach in Kashmir conflict and he went to Mumbai for surgery. His supporters and family alleged that this was a "human rights violation".

On 6 March 2014, Geelani fell ill with a severe chest infection, shortly after returning to his home in Srinagar. He has been under house arrest for most of the time since 2010, and was put under house arrest again on his return. In May 2015, Geelani applied for passport to visit his daughter in Saudi Arabia. The Indian government withheld it citing technical reasons, including the fact that he deliberately failed to fill in the nationality column required in the application. On 21 July, the Government granted him a passport on humanitarian grounds, with a validity of nine months, after Geelani acknowledged his nationality as an Indian.

=== Rumours of Geelani's death ===
On 12 March 2014, rumors of Geelani's death—spread by false or inaccurate edits to his Wikipedia article, "a particular Hindi news channel", and Facebook pages—led the government of Kashmir to suspend internet and phone service, according to some sources. However, the then Chief Minister Omar Abdullah said that the failures had nothing to do with Geelani's health and were due to a snapped power line as well as an optical fibre cut due to heavy snowfall, which left most of the valley without power. The cuts in Internet service, hours after a statement by Hurriyat that Geelani would be flown to New Delhi for medical treatment, were blamed for spreading the rumours.

=== FEMA case ===
After the 2019 Pulwama attack, India took stronger action against pro-Pakistan separatists including Geelani. The Enforcement Directorate levied a penalty of ₹14.40 lakh and ordered confiscation of nearly ₹6.8 lakh in connection with a Foreign Exchange Management Act case against him for illegal possession of foreign exchange.

== Death ==
Geelani reportedly developed breathing complications and died on 1 September 2021 at his Hyderpora residence in Srinagar due to his prolonged illness. His son Naseem alleged that police raided the house, took the body forcibly and buried it in a graveyard in his Hyderpora locality in the middle of the night. According to Naseem, no one from the close family was allowed to attend the burial, but they visited the grave next morning. Dilbag Singh, the Director General of Jammu and Kashmir Police, however denied the allegations.

Restrictions on travel and internet were imposed in Kashmir soon after Geelani's death. On 2 September 2021, FIR was registered against his family members under UAPA for clothing his body with a Pakistani flag and for allegedly raising “anti-national” slogans.

Kashmiri political leaders, as well as members of Government of Pakistan, condoled his death. Prime Minister Imran Khan ordered flags to be flown at half-mast to mourn his death.

== Honours and awards ==
On 14 August 2020, Pakistani President Arif Alvi conferred Nishan-e-Pakistan, Pakistan's highest civil award on Geelani to recognise his decades-long struggle for Kashmiris’ right to self-determination.

== Views ==
In February 2014, he said prisoners in Kashmir "are the victims of custodial violence and are harassed in Indian jails especially in Tihar Jail" after an incident where parents of Javaid Ahmad Khan, serving a life sentence, "had travelled thousands of kilometres and invested a lot of money to reach Delhi to meet their jailed son but were denied a meeting with him. "This is state terrorism", he said.

He is viewed as sympathetic to Jamat-e-Islami. His official residence was viewed as Jamat property before he donated it to the Milli Trust.

In November 2011, Geelani called for protests against the alleged "objectionable anti-Islamic" content on the social networking website Facebook, which he described as a "satanic audacity". His call triggered protests in various parts of the Kashmir Valley, leading to minor clashes between the protestors and the security forces.

Geelani condemned the killing of Osama bin Laden by the United States. After Bin Laden's death in May 2011, Geelani said that he would lead last rite prayers in absentia in Srinagar for the slain al-Qaeda leader. After holding prayers for Osama in congregation of thousands of Kashmiris, a European Union delegation snubbed Geelani by cancelling a scheduled meeting with him. He further supported 2001 Indian Parliament attack accused Afzal Guru and one of 2008 Mumbai Attacks masterminds and Lashkar-e-Taiba chief Hafiz Saeed.

=== Kashmir ===
Geelani said that while Pakistan supported "the indigenous struggle of the people of Jammu and Kashmir, morally, diplomatically and politically ... this does not mean Pakistan can take a decision on our behalf."

Geelani would only support a dialogue process aimed at resolving Kashmir issue in accordance with the wishes and aspirations of the people of the state. But he believed that dialogue between India and Pakistan starts under diplomatic compulsions, and it is nothing but just a time delaying tactics. He was of the opinion that Kashmiris are not enemies of India or hold any grudge against its inhabitants. We are desirous of a strong India and Pakistan and it is only possible when Kashmir issue is resolved to pave the way for peace, prosperity and development in the region.

He said, "Kashmir is not any border dispute between India and Pakistan which they can solve by bilateral understandings. It is the issue concerning future of 15 million people. The Hurriyat is not in principle against a dialogue process but without involvement of Kashmiri people, such a process has proved meaningless in the past. We don't have any expectations of it being fruitful in future too." He further stated, "India should immediately and unconditionally release political prisoners, and withdraw cases against youth, which are pending in the courts for the past 20 years."

=== Separatism and relations with Pakistan ===
Geelani has been repeatedly criticised by Indian authorities for inciting violence in the Kashmir Valley and working as offshoot of Pakistan. Geelani said openly that he was not Indian. "Travelling on the Indian passport is a compulsion of every Kashmiri as Kashmir is an Internationally accepted Disputed region between India and Pakistan" are his words when applying for Indian Passport. "We are Pakistani; Pakistan is ours", he said in a big gathering of his supporters.

While Geelani's personal opinion about Kashmir was that it merge with Pakistan, he was known for standing up to both the Indian and Pakistani governments, snubbing anyone (including former President of Pakistan Pervez Musharraf) who did not support the right to self-determination for Kashmir.

Sheikh Mustafa Kamal, a senior leader of Jammu & Kashmir National Conference and son of Sheikh Abdullah criticised Geelani for working on "dictations" given by Pakistan. He accused Geelani of being "a double agent" on "the payroll of Pakistan's ISI".

Pakistan also openly supported Geelani, the three-member delegation from Pakistan High Commission led by Abdul Basit met Geelani at his Malviya Nagar residence in March 2015. Pakistan High Commissioner Abdul Basit assured Geelani of complete support conveying that the country's stand on Kashmir remains unchanged despite regime change in New Delhi. Abdul Basit also invited Geelani for Pakistan Day function on 23 March. Pakistan High Commission in New Delhi, ritually invites pro-separatist leadership of Jammu and Kashmir. On 14 August, the Pakistani government awarded him its highest civilian award, the Nishan-e-Pakistan.

In the last few decades, Geelani refused any proposal from Governments of India and Pakistan and was consistent in his demand for the United Nations promised plebiscite of 1948.

== Works ==
=== Books ===
Some of his works include:

- Rūdād-i qafas (transl. Story of jailhouse), 1993. Author's memoirs of his imprisonment.
- Navā-yi ḥurriyyat (transl. Voice of Hurriyat), 1994. Collection of letters, columns and interviews on Kashmir issue.
- Dīd o shunīd (transl. Acquaintance), 2005. Compilation based on answers to the various questions relating to Kashmir issue.
- Bhārat ke istiʻmārī ḥarbe! : Kurālah Gunḍ se Jodhpūr tak! (transl. India's colonial wars: From Kralgund to Jodhpur), 2006. Autobiographical reminiscences with special reference to his struggle for the liberation of Kashmir.
- Sadāʼe dard : majmuvʻah taqārīr (transl. Cry of pain: collection of speeches), 2006. Collection of speeches on Kashmir issue.
- Millat-i maz̤lūm (transl. Nation of oppressed), 2006. Collection of articles and columns on various issues of Jammu and Kashmir with special reference to autonomy and independence movements of Kashmir.
- Safar-i Maḥmūd z̲ikr-i maẓlūm (transl. Journey of the commendable account of the oppressed), 2007. Compilation based on answers to the various questions relating to Kashmir issue.
- Maqtal se vāpsī : Rāncī jail ke shab o roz (transl. Back from the gallows: night and day in Ranchi jail), 2008. Autobiographical reminiscences.
- Iqbāl rūḥ-i dīn kā shanāsā (transl. Acquaintance with Iqbal's spirit of religion), 2009. Study on the works of Muhammad Iqbal.
- ʻĪdain (transl. Eids), 2011. Collection of sermons delivered on the occasion of Eid ul Fitr, Eid ul Adha, and Friday prayers.
- Vullar kināre : āp bītī (transl. By the Wular: autobiography), 2012. Autobiography.
- Qissa e Dard (transl. Account of pain)
- Muqadma al-haq (transl. Trial of truth)
- Tu baaki nahi (transl. You are no more)
- Mera pyaar aur hai (transl. My love is something else)
- Talkh haqayak (transl. Bitter truth)
- Elaan-e jungbandi (transl. Declaration of armistice)
- Hijrat aur shahadat (transl. Migration and martyrdom)
- Qurbani (transl. Sacrifice)
- Umeed-i bahar (transl. Hope of spring)
- Payam-e aakhreen (transl. The final message)

=== Letters ===
- A letter to V.P. Singh.
- A letter to Chandra Shekhar.

=== Others ===
- Vinoba Bhave se mulaqaat (transl. A meeting with Vinoba Bhave). Pamphlet, about a meeting with Indian social reformer Vinoba Bhave.
- Aulaad-e Ibrahim (transl. Children of Abraham). Pamphlet.
- Ek pahlu yeh bhi hai Kashmir ki tasvir ka (transl. Another aspect of Kashmir's affairs). Pamphlet.
- Qaul-e-Faisal (transl. Final judgment)
- 11 September ke baad (transl. After 9/11)
- Rasool-e rahmat aasir-i hazir main (transl. Prophet Muhammad in present times)
- Iqbal apni paygam ki roshni mein (transl. Iqbal in light of his message)
- Shayad ki utar jaaye tere dil mein meri baat (transl. Maybe you will understand me)
- Wa'tasimu bihablillahi jamia (Surah Al Imran Quran 3:103)
- Shahadat Gahe Ulfat (transl. Martyred in love)
- Rahravani ishq (transl. Travelers of love)
- Kunu Ansarullah (transl. Willing helpers of Allah)
- Kar-i jahan be-sabaat (transl. Unstable world affairs)
- Kargil

== See also ==
- Insurgency in Jammu and Kashmir
- All Parties Hurriyat Conference
- Joint Resistance Leadership
- Asiya Andrabi

== Bibliography ==
- Garner, George (2013). "Chechnya and Kashmir: The Jihadist Evolution of Nationalism to Jihad and Beyond". Terrorism and Political Violence. 25 (3): 419–434. doi:10.1080/09546553.2012.664202. ISSN 0954-6553. S2CID 143798822.
- Hakeem, Abdul (2014), Paradise on Fire: Syed Ali Geelani and the Struggle for Freedom in Kashmir, Markfield, Leicestershire, UK: Revival Publications, ISBN 978-0-9536768-6-6
- Jamal, Arif (2009), Shadow War: The Untold Story of Jihad in Kashmir, Melville House, ISBN 978-1-933633-59-6
- Sikand, Yoginder (July 2002), "The Emergence and Development of the Jama'at-i-Islami of Jammu and Kashmir (1940s-1990)", Modern Asian Studies, 36 (3): 705–751, doi:10.1017/s0026749x02003062, JSTOR 3876651, S2CID 145586329
- Sikand, Yoginder (2–8 October 2010), "Jihad, Islam and Kashmir: Syed Ali Shah Geelani's Political Project", Economic and Political Weekly, 45 (40): 125–134, JSTOR 25742155
