= Yoginder Sikand =

Indian writer and academic (born 1967)

- Born: 16 October 1967 (age 58)
- Occupations: Writer, academic

Yoginder Singh Sikand (born 1967) is an Indian writer and academic who has written several books on Islam-related issues in India.

== Early life and education ==
Sikand received his B.A. (Hons.) in economics from St. Stephen's College of the University of Delhi (1985–88), followed by an MA in sociology (1990–92) and an MPhil in sociology, from Jawaharlal Nehru University in New Delhi (1992–94). Thereafter, he received his PhD in history, focusing on the Tablighi Jama'at, from Royal Holloway College, University of London (1995–98).

He has been a post-doctoral fellow at Royal Holloway College (1999–2001), and the International Institute for the Study of Islam in the Modern World at the University of Leiden in the Netherlands (2002–2004).

== Career ==
Sikand was a reader in the department of Islamic studies at Hamdard University in New Delhi and was then appointed professor at the Centre for Jawaharlal Nehru Studies at Jamia Millia Islamia in New Delhi.

He currently lives in Bangalore and Shimla. Sikand writes two blogs, one about his own writing and another titled, 'Madrasa Reforms in India'.

== Works ==
- The Origins and Development of the Tablighi jam'aat: (1920–2000). A cross-country comparative study.(2002) New Delhi: Orient Longman. ISBN 81-250-2298-8.
- Sacred Spaces: Exploring Traditions of Shared Faith in India (2003). New Delhi: Penguin Books.
- Muslims in India since 1947: Islamic perspectives on interfaith relations (2004). London: Routledge Curzon. ISBN 0-415-40604-8.
- Islam, caste, and Dalit-Muslim relations in India (2004). New Delhi: Global Media Publications.
- Struggling to be heard South Asian Muslim voices South Asian Muslim voices. Global Media Publications, 2004.
- Bastions of the Believers: Madrasas and Islamic Education in India. Penguin Books, 2006. ISBN 0-14-400020-2.
- Islamist Militancy in Kashmir: The Case of Lashkar-e Taiba published in The practice of war: production, reproduction and communication of armed violence. ISBN 9781845452803
