= United Jihad Council =

Jihadist organisation formed by the Pakistan Army

The United Jihad Council, also known as the Muttahida Jihad Council (MJC), is an Islamist Jihadist coalition formed by the Pakistan Army for unified command and control over the anti-Indian militant groups operating in Jammu and Kashmir. It was formed in the summer of 1994 and is currently headed by Syed Salahuddin, the leader of Hizb-ul-Mujahideen. The coalition was created to unify and focus efforts of various armed militant groups fighting against Indian rule in Kashmir. This made distribution of resources like arms, ammunition, propaganda materials and communications more streamlined. It also made it easier to coordinate and pool resources of various militant groups to collect information, plan operations and strike at targets of military importance inside Indian administered Kashmir.

The militant group has 14 affiliates. Some of the group members are: Harakat-ul-Ansar, Hizb-ul-Mujahideen, Jamiat-ul-Mujahideen, Al-Jihad, Al-Barq, Al-Badr, Ikhwan-ul-Mussalmin and Tehrik-ul-Mujahideen. By early 1999, as many as fifteen organisations were affiliated with the Council, though of these only five were considered influential: Lashkar-e-Toiba, Hizb-ul-Mujahideen, Harkat-ul-Mujahideen, Al-Badr, and Tehrik-i-Jihad. Many of these organisations are recognised as terrorist organisations by the United States and the UN.

In June 2012 in an interview, Hizb-ul-Mujahideen chief Syed Salahuddin accepted that Pakistan had been backing Hizbul Mujahideen for fighting in Kashmir. He had threatened to start attacking Pakistan if the latter stopped backing the separatist militants in Jammu and Kashmir. He claimed the militants were fighting "Pakistan's war".

We are fighting Pakistan's war in Kashmir and if it withdraws its support, the war would be fought inside Pakistan

— Syed Salahuddin

The group claimed responsibility for the 2016 Pathankot attack, carried out on Pathankot Air Base administered by the Indian Air Force on 3 January 2016. The incident claimed 14 casualties, including 7 security personnel, 1 civilian, and 6 attackers.

== Bibliography ==
- Snedden, Christopher (2013) [first published as The Untold Story of the People of Azad Kashmir, 2012], Kashmir: The Unwritten History, HarperCollins India, ISBN 978-9350298985
