= Muhammad Ishaq =

Muhammad Ishaq (Arabic: محمد إسحاق) is an Arabic masculine given name popular in Afghanistan, Bangladesh and Pakistan. It may refer to:

- Shah Muhammad Ishaq (1783–1846), Indian Islamic scholar
- Muhammad Ishaq (scholar) (1883–1938), Bengali Islamic scholar, author and philanthropist
- Muhammad Ishaq Alam Muzaffarnagari (1901–1969), Urdu poet
- Muhammad Ishaq (historian) (1910–2005), Bangladeshi historian and academic
- Syed Muhammad Ishaq (1915–1977), Bangladeshi Islamic scholar, author and educationist
- Syed Muhammad Ishaq Gazruni, 14th century Pakistani Sufi saint entombed in Wazir Khan Mosque, Pakistan
- Muhammad Ishaq Bhatti (1925–2015), Pakistani Islamic scholar
- Mohammad Ishaq Miah (1932–2017), Bangladeshi politician
- Md. Ishak (1934–2001), Bangladeshi politician
- Muhammad Ishaq (politician) (born 1935), Bangladeshi politician and Islamic scholar
- Mohammad Ishaq Aloko (born 1935), former Attorney General of Afghanistan
- M. Ishaq Nadiri (born 1935), Afghan economist
- Muhammad Ishaq Khattak (born 1944), Pakistani politician
- Mohammad Ishaq Khan (1946–2013), Kashmiri historian
- Mohammad Ishaq (cricketer, born 1963) (born 1963), Pakistani cricketer
- Mohammad Ishaq (Afghan cricketer) (born 2005), Afghan cricketer

== See also ==
- Muhammad (name)
- Ishak (name)
- Mohammad Ishaq (disambiguation)
