= Mohammad Ishaq =

Mohammad Ishaq may refer to:

- Mohammad Ishaq (cricketer, born 1963) (born 1963), Emirati cricketer
- Mohammad Ishaq (Afghan cricketer) (born 2005), Afghan cricketer
- Mohammad Ishaq Aloko (born 1935), Afghan writer
- Mohammad Ishaq Khan (1946–2013), Indian historian
- Mohammad Ishaq Miah, Bangladeshi politician
- Mohammad Ishaq Al-Fayyad (born 1930), Afghan religious leader
- Mohammad Ishak, Bangladeshi cricketer

== See also ==
- Muhammad Ishaq (disambiguation)
