= 2017 Nowhatta mob lynching =

- Part of Insurgency in Jammu and Kashmir; Kashmir conflict
- Location: 34.098352°N 74.809180°E; Inside and near Jamia Masjid, Srinagar, Jammu and Kashmir, India
- Date: 22 June 2017; Between 11:30 p.m. to 12:00 a.m. (UTC+5.30)
- Target: DSP Mohammed Ayub Pandith of Jammu and Kashmir Police
- Attack type: Lynching; Piercing; Stoning
- Weapons: Stones, logs and sharp weapons
- Deaths: 1
- Injuries: 3
- Victim: Muhammad Ayub Pandith
- Perpetrators: A mob shouting slogans in support of Pakistan and al-Qaida operative Zakir Musa, with a key role played by Hizbul Mujahideen militant Sajid Gilkar
- Assailant: Large mob
- Motive: Suspicion of being an agent of Indian security services
- Inquiry: Inquiry under process by Jammu and Kashmir Police
- Accused: Hizbul terrorist Sajid Ahmad Gilkar killed in counter-terrorism operation.
- Charges: Murder u/s 302 Ranbir Penal Code
- Verdict: Prosecution initiated. Special investigation undertaken by State Police.

The 2017 Nowhatta mob lynching, was the lynch mob murder and mutilation of an on-duty undercover Indian Jammu and Kashmir Police officer Muhammad Ayub Pandith, on the Muslim holy night of Laylat al-Qadr on Thursday 22 June 2017 by a mob in Nowhatta after a crowd shouted slogans in favor of Pakistan as well as al-Qaida jihadist Zakir Musa. Sajjad Ahmad Gilkar, a Hizbul Mujahideen militant, had played a key role in the lynching according to the state police.

== Details ==
Deputy Superintendent Mohammed Ayub Pandith, who worked in the security wing of Jammu and Kashmir Police, was deployed in civilian clothing as part of the security for devotees attending the night-long prayers in the Jamia Masjid in the Nowhatta area of Srinagar's old city on 22 June. IANS quoted informed sources stating that he was on frisking duty when he was attacked. He had been posted for quite some time and many locals who regularly visited the mosque knew him. The mob had earlier shouted slogans in support of Pakistan pro al-Qaida slogans for operative and jihadist Zakir Musa. It was reported that the sloganeering had been recorded by Pandith. According to Munir Khan, IGP of Kashmir Range, Pandith was spotted by four miscreants when he came out of the mosque after checking deployment for access control duties. They called and questioned him, later demanding him to show his identity card but he refused. He was then heckled and the number of hooligans increased. He then fired some shots with his service rifle, injuring three hecklers. The mob however continued to beat him, resulting in his death. Suspicions on Pandith were raised when people witnesses him clicking photos near a mosque.

It was reported that the earlier sloganeering by the crowd had been recorded by Pandith. Per ADGP of Jammu and Kashmir Police (Security) Dilbagh Singh, some people had spread false rumours that he was from security agency. He also stated that the reports of Pandith being caught after taking pictures of the sloganeering mob were just rumours. A member of the Hizbul Mujahideen terrorist group, Sajid Ahmad Gilkar had played a key role in the lynching according to the state police. According to Shesh Paul Vaid, he had been sent to the mosque to ensure the protection of people offering prayers and sent his security detail home when worshippers singled him out and began closing in. Eyewitnesses however gave a different explanation stating that he was spotted with at least one other man, and one of them was taking photographs, after which a group of youngsters confronted them and asked them about their identity papers. Pandith had tried to escape by firing his pistol, leaving three people injured. According to eyewitnesses, rumours spread that he was a "non-Muslim" belonging to the "security agencies" after which he was killed. A police officer claimed he had been targeted because the crowd thought him to be a Kashmiri Pandit due to his surname. Witnesses stated that the mob killed him after he fired at them, with people shouting they had caught a "man of the C.I.D.". He was abused as an "Indian IB and RAW security agent". He was attacked, stripped naked, hit with stones, batons, iron rods, sharp weapons and logs and his body was recovered in a mutilated state. Another eyewitness stated that some of the attackers were seen biting arms and legs of Ayub's fallen naked body "like dogs".

The chief-priest of the mosque and chairman of the separatist Hurriyat Conference, Mirwaiz Umar Farooq, was leading a prayer on forgiveness in the mosque, where Pandith was serving on his usual duty to protect the mosque and its worshipers from the troubles. After the lynching, the mob went on a rampage and targeted empty security pickets. Police reinforcements were later deployed to restore normalcy.

A relative of Ayub Pandith criticised the separatists on Zee News, blaming them for his death and alleging that the mob killed Pandith thinking he was a Kashmiri Pandit. Pandith's sister questioned his killing on NDTV, while also denying he was an "informer".

== Aftermath ==
=== Immediate response by Police ===
On 23 June early morning, soon after the incident Nowhatta Police was informed about the murder. Nearly after an hour, heavy reinforcement of Jammu and Kashmir Police and Central Reserve Police Force had to resort to fire several shots in air to safely recover the mutilated corpse of slain Deputy superintendent of Police who was lying naked in the vicinity of Jamia Masjid. He was yet to be identified as there was confusion regarding his identity. J&K Police in its earlier statement had told reporters that the corpse was not of a Police department personnel. Police took the body to Police Control Room in Srinagar where it was ascertained that the slain was Deputy superintendent of Police deployed in civvies to access the situation in Jamia Masjid, Srinagar on the night of Laylat al-Qadr when a huge number of Sunni Muslim devotees throng Jamia Masjid. Nowhatta Police Station, under whose jurisdiction lynching took place immediately registered a case vide FIR No 51/2017 Under Section 302 (murder). Two youth identified as Muhammad Danish and Mudasir Ahmad were arrested promptly by Police and one was identified on 23 June. Director of Jammu and Kashmir Police, Shesh Paul Vaid was himself supervising the progress in investigations.

On 24 June, Vaid told media reporters, twelve persons have been suspected in the lynching incident and three of them were arrested reaching a toll of five persons in aggregation. Vaid also ordered transfer of Khaliq Bhat, the then Superintendent of Police North Srinagar under whose jurisdiction remained the area where the lynching took place.

On 24 July, Muneer Khan disclosed at a press conference, at least twenty suspects were arrested in this case so far while one Hizb militant involved in the lynching was also killed in an encounter at Beerwah in Budgamon on 11 July.

The suspects are being tried at a Srinagar sessions court.

=== Key suspect shot dead ===
DIG, M. Dinakaran informed that Hizbul terrorist Sajid Ahmad Gilkar, who played a key part in the mob killing of Pandith, was shot dead on morning of 12 July 2017 by the security forces in a shootout. He was also involved in 22 April grenade attacks on the CRPF at Nowhatta on 22, 30 April April attack on Khanyar police party, and 21 June attack on SafaKadal CRPF camp. On 11 July 2017 evening, Indian security forces were fired up on during a Cordon and search operation launched after receiving specific inputs about the presence of militants. Search operation was halted for the night, while the cordon stayed to stop militants from escaping. The shoot out started in the morning, and another mob of villager formed to help the terrorists escape was successfully driven away. In the shoot out, security forces shot dead three Hizb-ul-Mujahideen terrorists including Gilkar. Forces also recovered an AK-56 assault rifle, a self-loading rifle, a pistol and seven magazines.

=== Anti-terrorism Operation Hunt Down ===
Security forces, including J&K Police and Central Paramilitary forces of India, jointly intensified the cordon and search grid-based "Operation Hunt Down" to track and kill the LeT, Jaish-e-Mohammad and Hizbul Mujahideen terrorists placed on the identified "hit list", and had already killed 102 terrorists from 1 January to 14 July 2017, including the extermination of terrorists responsible for the killing of seven J&K Police cops and the lynching of DSP Ayub Pandith, while a colossal hunt was on for mastermind of 2017 Amarnath Yatra attack, LeT commander Abu Ismail.

== Reactions ==
The lynching caused an outrage among political and social circles. The family of Pandith criticised the killers and separatists for his death.

Chief Minister of Jammu and Kashmir Mehbooba Mufti criticized the lynching, terming it as shameful while paying tribute to Pandith. She also praised the state police while also cautioning the people of severe backlash i the police loses its patience. Deputy Chief Minister Nirmal Kumar Singh called it "murder" and assured of action in the case. He also criticized the separatists stating that they don't speak out when such incidents take place. National Conference's working president Omar Abdullah called the lynching as "height of barbarism", expressing solidarity with Pandith's family and colleagues while demanding that the culprits be brought to book and given the sternest possible punishment.

Separatist leader Mirwaiz Umar Farooq too criticized it, stating he was "deeply disturbed by the brutal act" while blaming the state for it as a response to its use of the police which he stated was used for "brutalisation". He also denied being in the mosque when the lynching occurred, stating that it occurred before he reached there.

Tariq Ahmad, a Jammu and Kashmir police officer, stated that it had become dangerous for him to go outside and pray in the neighbourhood mosque, while some of the locals had become hostile to Kashmiri policemen. Former DGP K Rajendra Kumar stated that the anger of Kashmiris towards the police should be seen as an emerging situation where both sides are hardening their stance, the role of Kashmiri police should be taken into account who have been beaten up, with their families threatened and houses vandalised. He stated that the incident took place after Zakir Musa threatened the police and Hurriyat, adding that slogans were raised in Musa's favor because of political and religious radicalisation among the youth. He stated that he couldn't remember the way J&K Police were seen as enemies by their own people as they were currently.

== See also ==
- Kashmir conflict
- Zakir Rashid Bhat
- Hizbul Mujahideen
