= Najmul Hasan (journalist) =

- Born: 10 February 1946
- Died: 11 August 1983 (aged 37); Mehran, Iran
- Cause of death: Land mine explosion
- Education: Aligarh Muslim University
- Employer(s): Reuters, Hindustan Times
- Spouse: Barbara
- Father: Mohibbul Hasan
- Family: Mushirul Hasan (brother)

Najmul Hasan (10 February 1946 – 11 August 1983) was an Indian journalist based out of Delhi. An experienced correspondent, Hasan was killed while on an assignment to cover the Iran-Iraq war for Reuters.

He was the son of historian Mohibbul Hasan and brother of modern India historian Mushirul Hasan. Prior to joining Reuters in January 1978, Hasan worked for the Indian daily, Hindustan Times. Over the years, he covered the Soviet–Afghan War, political turbulence in Nepal and Bangladesh, the ethnic violence owing to the Assam agitation.

On 8 August 1983, Hasan was sent to Iran to cover the war with Iraq. Three days later, on 11 August, while inspecting the areas captured by Iranian forces along with a group of journalists embedded with the Iran government, a landmine explosion killed Hasan and a government official escorting the journalists.

Hasan was buried in a cemetery in Saket, Delhi. He was survived by his wife Barbara Hasan and two children.

A Reuters fellowship was established in his memory at the Oxford University.

== See also ==
- Danish Siddiqui
- Priya Ramrakha
