= Attorney General's Office of Afghanistan =

Government agency of Afghanistan

The attorney general of Afghanistan is a legal post in the government of Afghanistan.

Under the 2004 Constitution of Afghanistan, the attorney general was the government's chief legal advisor and was also the nation's top prosecutor. After taking over the government in 2021, the Taliban transferred responsibility for the prosecution of crimes to the country's judiciary. The Taliban appointed an acting attorney general, Shamsulldin Shariati, but it was unclear what his responsibilities were.

In July 2023, the Attorney General's Office was abolished by a decree of Supreme Leader Hibatullah Akhundzada and was replaced by the High Directorate of Supervision and Prosecution of Decrees and Orders.

== List of attorneys general of Afghanistan ==
Name of Attorney General	Assumed office	Left office
Abdul Jabar Sabet	Appointed by President Hamid Karzai in May, 2006	August, 2008
Mohammad Ishaq Aloko	Appointed by President Hamid Karzai in August, 2008	October, 2014
Mohammad Farid Hamidi	Appointed by President Ashraf Ghani in 2016	March, 2021
Zabihullah K. Karimullah	Appointed by President Ashraf Ghani in April, 2021	August, 2021
Shamsulldin Shariati	Appointed by Supreme Leader Hibatullah Akhundzada in September, 2021	July, 2023

== Address ==
- Attorney General's Office, Share Naw, Kabul, Afghanistan
- http://ago.gov.af/

== See also ==
- Attorney General
