= Mirwaiz =

Religious title (position) for Islamic head preacher in Kashmir

Mirwaiz (Urdu: میر واعظ; from Persian mir 'chief' and waiz 'preacher') is a hereditary religious title for the chief cleric or head preacher of the Muslim community in the Kashmir Valley. The title, unique to Kashmir, traditionally involved providing religious instruction and leading sermons in major shrines and mosques. Over time, the holders of the title also assumed social, cultural and political roles within Kashmiri society.

The title Mirwaiz of Kashmir is presently held by Mirwaiz Umar Farooq, who succeeded his father, Mirwaiz Mohammad Farooq, in 1990.

== Lineages ==
Two principle Mirwaiz lineages exists in the region: Mirwaiz of Kashmir, based at the historic Jamia Masjid in Srinagar, and the Mirwaiz Hamadani associated with the Khanqah of Shah-e-Hamdan and tracing its origins to followers of the 14th-century Persian saint Mir Sayyid Ali Hamadani. Each lineage has historically remained hereditary within a distinct clerical family. Rivalry between the two lineages, often intertwined in local politics, and have at times resulted in open confrontations.

The Mirwaiz office is traditionally hereditary within certain clerical families, tenure continues until death, resignation or displacement; there is no fixed term.

== Functions and significance ==
The Mirwaiz of Kashmir traditionally heads the main Friday sermon (Khutbah) at the largest and historic Jamia Masjid in Srinagar, and leads congregational prayers on major occasions, such as Eid al-Fitr and Eid al-Adha.

The Mirwaiz has often been a figure of political significance in Kashmir's socio-political context, addressing communal issues, conflict, and sometimes heading political formations.

== Notable holders of the title ==
=== Mirwaiz-i-Kashmir ===
The Lineage of the Mirwaiz of Kashmir traces back to Maulvi Siddiq-Ullah (1075–1155 AH) and his son Akhund Maulvi Abdulsalam (1129–1209 AH), who preached Islam near Srinagar. Abdulsalam's son Hafiz Ghulam Rasool Shah (1161–1234 AH), known as Lassi baba, was the first to hold the title of Mirwaiz-i-Kashmir. His brothers became associated with the parallel Mirwaiz Hamdani line.

Subsequent holders included Muhammad Yahya (1201–1298 AH), who translated the 30th Juz' of the Quran into Kashmiri, and his son Maulvi Rasool Shah (1855–1909 CE), a pioneer of modern education and founder of Anjuman-e-Nusrat-ul-Islam. The title later passed through Maulvi Atiq Ullah Shah (1872–1962 CE) and his brother Maulvi Ahmadullah Shah.

Mirwaiz Muhammad Yusuf Shah (1894–1968), a graduate of Darul Uloom Deoband, succeeded them and produced a widely recognised Kashmiri Quran translation published by King Fahd Printing Press in Medina. In 1947, he went into exile and served twice as President of Azad Kashmir.

After Atiq Ullah's death in 1962, Molvi Mohammad Farooq became Naib (deputy) Mirwaiz and later the Mirwaiz of Kashmir from 1968 until his assassination in 1990. His son Mirwaiz Umar Farooq (born 1973) succeeded him in 1990.

=== Mirwaiz Hamdani ===
The Mirwaiz Hamdani lineage is traditionally based in Srinagar, with its seat at the historic Khanqah-e-Moula. Notable holders of this lineage include Moulvi Sidique, followed by Molvi Salah, Molvi Ghulam, Moulvi Ahmadullah Hamdani, his son Ghulam Nabi Hamdani, Muhammad Yaseen Hamdani, and current holder, his son Riyaz Ahmad Hamdani.

== Sources ==
- Tikoo, Colonel Tej K. (30 June 2012). Kashmir: Its Aborigines and Their Exodus. Lancer Publishers LLC. ISBN 978-1-935501-58-9.
- Zutshi, Chitralekha (2004). Languages of Belonging: Islam, Regional Identity, and the Making of Kashmir. Hurst & Company. ISBN 978-1-85065-700-2.
- Mridu Rai (2004). Hindu Rulers, Muslim Subjects: Islam, Rights, and the History of Kashmir. C. Hurst & Co. Publishers. pp. 268–269. ISBN 978-1-85065-701-9.
- Dar, Nazir Ahmad (2006), Religious Institutes Of Kashmir, Jay Kay Book Shop, ISBN 978-81-87221-57-9
- Verma, Bharat; Singh, Manvendra (1994). Kashmir: The Troubled Frontiers. New Delhi: Lancer International. p. 62. "In 1905, the Mir Waiz of Kashmir, Maulvi Rasul Shah founded the 'Anjuman-i-Nusrat-ul-Islam'."
- Singh, Jasjit (1990). India and Pakistan: Crisis of Relationship. New Delhi: Lancer International. p. 221. ISBN 978-81-7062-118-8.
- Rizwi, Syed Mehboob. "Maulana Muhammad Yusuf Shah Kashmiri Mir Waiz". Tarikh Darul Uloom Deoband [History of the Dar al-Ulum Deoband]. Vol. 2. Translated by Murtaz Husain F Quraishi (1981 ed.). Deoband: Darul Uloom Deoband. pp. 103–105.
- Hussain, Sheikh Showkat (2017), Kashmir Profiles, Dar Al Kotob Al Ilmiyah, ISBN 978-2-7451-2195-0
