= Zabihullah Karimullah =

Attorney General of Afghanistan

څارنپوه Zabihullah K. Karimullah
- ‌ذبیح الله کلیم کریم الله

Attorney General of Afghanistan
- In office April 2021 – 15 August 2021
- President: Ashraf Ghani
- Succeeded by: Shamsulldin Shariati (acting)

Personal details
- Born: 1982 (age 43–44) Logar, Afghanistan
- Education: LL.B Law, Master of Laws LL.M
- Alma mater: University of California, Al-Azhar University
- Profession: Attorney, Lawyer, Legal Professional

Zabihullah K. Karimullah born in 1982, is an Afghan lawyer, human rights professional, and a former Attorney General of Afghanistan. He was appointed by President Ashraf Ghani after Mohammad Farid Hamidi resigned from the post. He is an ethnic Pashtun born in Logar, Afghanistan.

== Early life and education ==
Zabihullah Karimullah was born in 1982 in Logar province. He completed his primary education in a local school. Afterwards he was admitted to the Law School at Al-Azhar University in Cairo, Egypt, where he received his bachelor, LL.B degree. After that, he earned his master's degree LL.M from faculty of Law of California University, UC Davis.

== Career ==
Karimullah has more than 14 years of experience in the areas of good governance, rule of law, access to justice and human rights at the national and international levels in Afghanistan and in Sudan with the United Nations Development Programme.

He joined the Afghan government in 2018 and worked as the attorney general of the country and also as the General Director of the State Lawsuits Department from 2018 till 2021.

He visited the International Criminal Court in May 2021 and met with the ICC Prosecutor Fatou Bensouda and other ICC prosecutors, and stressed on the importance of joint work, information sharing and cooperation with the ICC to support the investigation of war crimes committed in Afghanistan, and to achieve justice for the Afghan people by holding perpetrators of atrocity crimes accountable.

== Attorney General ==
H.E Zabihullah K. Karimullah was appointed in April 2021 as the Attorney General of Afghanistan by President Ashraf Ghani. Karimullah served his country by strengthening the rule of law and accountability for human rights violations. He also focused on civic values and fighting against corruption, inequality, injustice, and violence against women and children in Afghanistan.

== New Zealand ==
After the Fall of Kabul in 2021, he, his wife, and their four children were accepted as refugees by New Zealand. They now live in Auckland.
