= Mohammad Farooq Shah =

Former Mirwaiz of Kashmir (1944–1990)

Mirwaiz Maulvi Mohammad Farooq Shah
- محمد فاروق شاہ
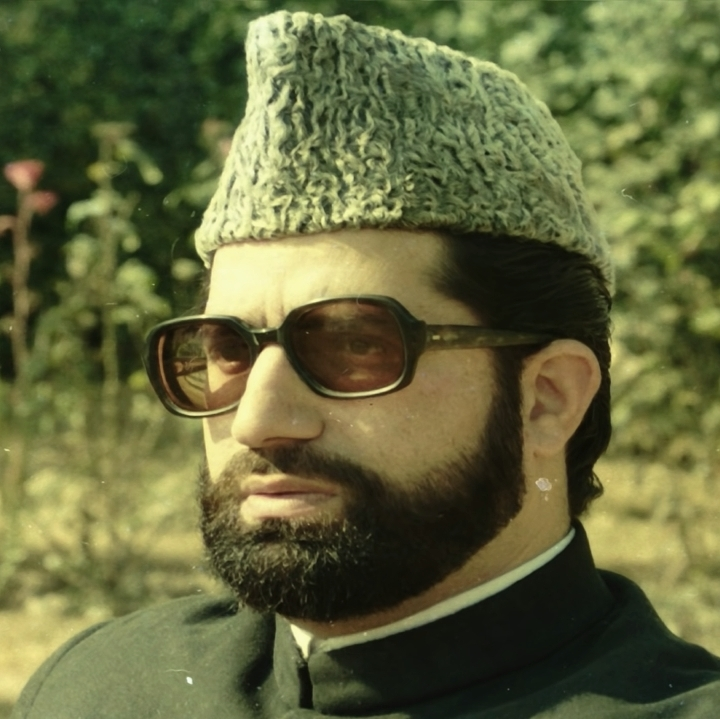

Mirwaiz of Kashmir
- In office 1968 – 21 May 1990
- Preceded by: Mirwaiz Yusuf Shah
- Succeeded by: Mirwaiz Umar Farooq
- Title: Mirwaiz-i-Kashmir

Personal life
- Born: December 21, 1944 Srinagar, Jammu and Kashmir
- Died: 21 May 1990 SKIMS, Soura, Srinagar
- Cause of death: Assassination
- Resting place: Mazar-i-Shuhada, Eidgah, Srinagar
- Children: 2, including Mirwaiz Umar Farooq
- Citizenship: India
- Occupation: Politician, religious leader
- Relations: Mirwaiz Yusuf Shah (uncle)

Religious life
- Religion: Islam

Mohammad Farooq Shah (Note: Urdu: محمد فاروق شاہ) (1944–1990) commonly known as Mirwaiz Moulvi Farooq, was a prominent Indian religious leader and political figure. As the Mirwaiz of Kashmir, he served as the head cleric of historic Jamia Masjid in Srinagar, and led the All Jammu and Kashmir Awami Action Committee (ACC), a coalition of political parties in Jammu and Kashmir that sought resolution of the Kashmir conflict.

== Early life ==
Moulvi Farooq was born on 21 December 1944 (27th Dhu al-Hijjah 1363 AH) in Srinagar. He belonged to the influential clerical family that held the traditional title of Mirwaiz of Kashmir. He received his early education at home and later enrolled at Islamia and Oriental College, studying theology, Islam and Arabic language and literature.

== Religious and clerical role ==
In 1968, following the death of his uncle, Mirwaiz Yusuf Shah, he succeeded to the position of Mirwaiz of Kashmir. As head preacher of the historic Jamia Masjid in Srinagar, he delivered sermons and held religious authority in Kashmir Valley.

== Political activism and leadership ==
At the age of 19, Shah emerged as a leader during the agitation over the disappearance of the relic from Hazratbal Shrine. He led protests demanding its recovery and helped found the All Jammu and Kashmir Awami Action Committee (ACC), a coalition of political parties in Kashmir, becoming its chairman.

Although primarily a religious figure, his role expanded into socio-political mobilisation, especially representing sections of Kashmiri Muslims outside the dominant regional parties.

== Assassination and aftermath ==
On 21 May 1990, Shah was shot by gunmen in his residence at Nigeen, Srinagar. He was shifted to SKIMS, Soura, where he was declared dead. His funeral procession passed through the Hawal area of Srinagar, where shots were fired at mourners, resulting in deaths of dozens of civilians; his body was dropped in the middle of the road, an event that came to be known as the Hawal massacre.

In 2010, a militant of the Hizbul Mujahideen was convicted of his murder, and in 2023, two additional militants were arrested by the police in connection with the assassination. In a press briefing, the police said the arrested militants included the one who had entered into the bedroom of Mirwaiz and opened fire at him.

== See also ==
- Jamia Masjid, Srinagar
- All Parties Hurriyat Conference
