= Atiq Ullah (Kashmiri leader) =

Mirwaiz of Kashmir

Atiqullah Shah Maulvi Mirwaiz
- مولوی عتیق اللہ شاہ
- Born: c. 1872
- Died: c. 1962
- Title: Mirwaiz
- Term: 1950s
- Relatives: Mirwaiz Yusuf Shah (nephew)

Atiq Ullah or Atiqullah (Srinagar; 1872–1962) (Note: 1291–1381 AH) was acting Mirwaiz of Kashmir during the 1950s.

His nephew, Mirwaiz Yusuf Shah, was the official mirwaiz, but had been exiled away to Pakistan by the Indian government during the partition of India. His brother Ahmed Ullah or Ahmadullah of Jamia Masjid was also a traditionalist Muslim leader. They were known for opposition to the Ahmadiya Movement.
