= Mushirul Hasan =

Indian historian (1949–2018)

- Born: 15 August 1949; Bilaspur
- Died: 10 December 2018 (aged 69)
- Education: Aligarh Muslim University; Cambridge University
- Spouse: Zoya Hasan
- Scientific career
- Fields: History

Mushirul Hasan (15 August 1949 – 10 December 2018) was a historian of modern India. He wrote on the partition of India, communalism, and on the history of Islam in South Asia.

== Education ==
Hasan was the second son of historian Mohibbul Hasan and brother of journalist Najmul Hasan. Mushirul Hasan obtained his M. A. from the Aligarh Muslim University in 1969. He then earned a Doctorate (PhD) from the University of Cambridge in 1977.

== Career ==
He was a professor in the Department of History and Culture, Jamia Millia Islamia, New Delhi. He also served as the Director of Academy of Third World Studies in Jamia Millia Islamia from July 2000 to January 2010. He was the Pro-Vice Chancellor of Jamia Millia Islamia from 1992 to 1996. Later, he served as the Vice-Chancellor of Jamia Millia Islamia (2004-2009) for which he has been described as an "institution builder". In May 2010, he was appointed the Director-General of the National Archives of India. He was elected as the President of the Indian History Congress in 2002.

He also held academic positions at the Wissenschaftskolleg (Institute of Advanced Study), Berlin, Centre d'Études de l'Inde et de l'Asie du Sud (Centre for Indian and South Asian Studies), Paris, Centre of South Asian Studies, University of Cambridge, UK, St Antony's College, Oxford, and the Nehru Memorial Museum and Library, New Delhi.

== Awards ==
- The D. P. Singhal Scholarship, University of Queensland, Brisbane, 2003.
- The Ford Foundation (SARC) Fellowship by the Institute of Islamic Studies, University of Oxford, 2002–03.
- D.Lit (Honoris Causa) by Uttar Pradesh Rajarshi Tandon Open University (UPRTOU), Allahabad, 2006.
- Professor Sukumar Sen Memorial Gold Medal by The Asiatic Society, Kolkata, 2006.
- Padma Shri, 2007.
- D.Lit (Honoris Causa) by Calcutta University, Kolkata, 2008.
- Mahatma Gandhi National Fellowship by the Indian Council of Social Science Research, 2009–2011.
- Ordre des Palmes Académiques, 2010.
- Conferred the Jawaharlal Nehru Fellowship by the Jawaharlal Nehru Memorial Fund on the occasion of the 124th birth anniversary of the former Prime Minister on 14 November 2014.

== Death and legacy ==
Hasan died on 10 December 2018 and was buried at Jamia Millia Islamia graveyard.

An endowment named after him was established by Jamia Millia Islamia with the donation from his wife Zoya Hasan. The endowment was slated to offer a post-doctoral fellowship and two post-graduate merit-cum-means scholarships annually. An annual Mushirul Hasan Memorial Seminar on contemporary history, society and politics in India is also organized at the university.

== Books ==
His books include:

- A Nationalist Conscience: M. A. Ansari, the Congress and the Raj, (Delhi: Manohar, 1987)
- Nationalism and Communal Politics in India, 1885–1930 (Delhi: Manohar, 1991). Paperback edition published in 1994. Reprinted in 2000.
- The Legacy of a Divided Nation: India's Muslims Since Independence (Oxford University Press, 1997)
- John Company to the Republic: A Story of Modern India, (Lotus Collection, 2001)
- Islam in the Subcontinent: Muslims in a Plural Society, (Manohar, 2002)
- From Pluralism to Separatism: Qasbas in Colonial India, (Oxford University Press, 2003)
- Making Sense of History: Society, Culture and Politics (Manohar, 2003)
- A Moral Reckoning: Muslim Intellectuals in Nineteenth-Century Delhi (Oxford University Press, 2005)
- The Nehrus: Personal Histories (2006)
- Partners in Freedom: Jamia Millia Islamia, (Niyogi Books: Delhi, 2006), (with Rakhshanda Jalil)
- Wit and Humour in Colonial North India (Niyogi Books: Delhi, 2007)
- Moderate or Militant? Images Of India's Muslims (Oxford University Press, 2008)
- Between Modernity and Nationalism: Halide Edip's Encounter with Gandhi's India (Oxford University Press, 2010)
- Faith and Freedom: Gandhi in History (Niyogi Books: Delhi, 2013)
- Islam, Pluralism, Nationhood: Legacy of Maulana Azad (Niyogi Books: Delhi, 2014)
