= Zoya Hasan =

Indian academic and political scientist

Professor Zoya Hasan
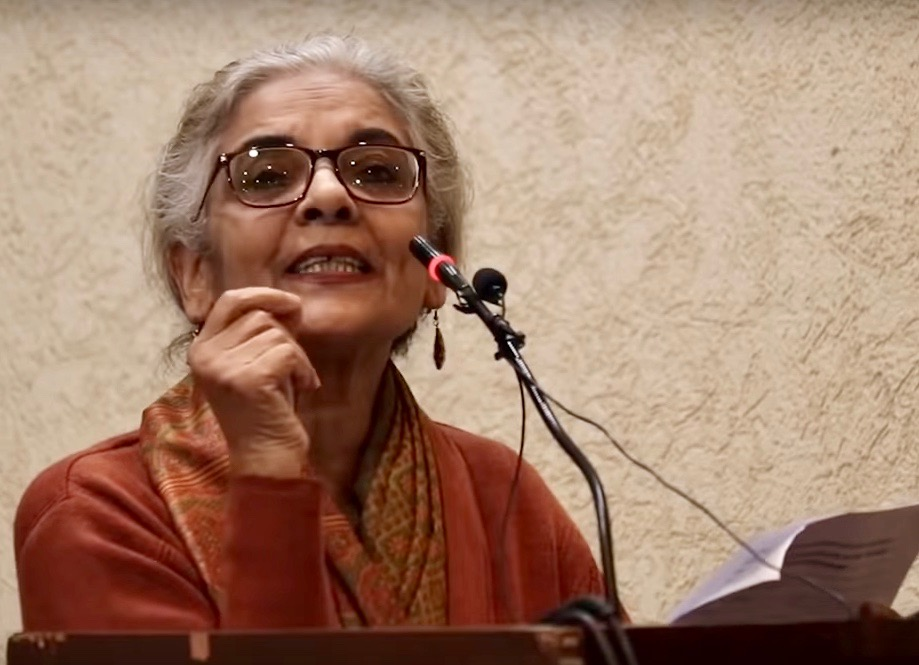
- Born: 7 August 1947 (age 79); Lucknow, India
- Spouse: Mushirul Hasan (m. 1974; died 2018)

Academic work
- Notable works: Dominance and mobilisation: rural politics in western Uttar Pradesh

Zoya Hasan (born 7 August 1947) is an Indian professor.

== Early life and education ==
Zoya Hasan was born on 7 August 1947 in Lucknow. She studied at Aligarh Muslim University and earned a doctorate in political science from Pennsylvania State University.

== Career ==
She is Professor Emerita of Political Science and served as the Dean of the School of Social Sciences (SSS) at the Jawaharlal Nehru University, New Delhi. She was a member of the National Commission for Minorities from 2006 to 2009. She has been a Visiting Professor at the Zurich, Edinburgh, and Maison des Sciences de L'Homme, Paris, and held fellowships at the Institute of Development Studies, University of Sussex, Bellagio Center, and Centre for Modern Oriental Studies, Berlin. She has worked on research projects for the Indian Council of Social Science Research, Ford Foundation, DFID, United Nations Research Institute for Social Development and the Observer Research Foundation.

Hasan's work has focused on the state, political parties, ethnicity, gender, and minorities in India, and society in North India. She is known for her work on the politics of Uttar Pradesh.

== Personal life ==
Zoya was married to the Indian historian and former Vice Chancellor of Jamia Millia Islamia University, New Delhi, Mushirul Hasan (1949-2018).
