= Sheikh Manzar Masaud =

Sheikh Manzar Masood

Interim President of Azad Jammu and Kashmir
- In office 16 April 1975 – 5 June 1975
- Preceded by: Sardar Mohammad Abdul Qayyum Khan
- Succeeded by: Sardar Muhammad Ibrahim Khan

Sheikh Manzar Masood was an Azad Kashmiri politician who served as President of Azad Kashmir. Mr. Masood was the founder speaker of AJK assembly. He remained a speaker of AJK assembly for a term of five years. He became the president of AJK in April 1975 for a shorter period (16 April to 5 June). Later on he became the Advisor on Parliamentary affairs to the then-Prime Minister Zulfiqar Ali Bhutto . He served as an advisor for two years until the military coup in Pakistan. He was arrested in 1977 by Pakistan Army. He remained a member of assembly for four terms and his wife remained member of assembly and advisor to the Government for three terms.
