= Raja Muhammad Haydar Khan =

Kashmiri politician

Muhammad Haydar Khan

Interim President of Azad Jammu and Kashmir
- In office 18 May 1952 – 21 June 1952
- Preceded by: Mirwaiz Yusuf Shah
- Succeeded by: Sher Ahmed Khan

Raja Muhammad Haidar Khan (died 20 April 1966) was an Azad Kashmiri politician who served as interim President of Azad Kashmir from 18 May to 21 June 1952.
