= Muhammad Hayat Khan (Azad Kashmiri politician) =

Kashmiri politician

Major General Muhammad Hayat Khan

President of Azad Jammu and Kashmir
- In office 1 November 1978 – 31 January 1983
- Preceded by: Sardar Muhammad Ibrahim Khan
- Succeeded by: Major General Abdul Rahman Khan

Personal details
- Born: 20 December 1928
- Died: 18 May 2010 (aged 81)
- Awards: Sitara-i-Imtiaz Sitara-e-Basalat

Military service
- Allegiance: Pakistan
- Branch/service: Pakistan Army
- Rank: Major General

Major General Muhammad Hayat Khan was a Kashmiri politician who served as the 15th President of Azad Kashmir from 1 November 1978 to 31 January 1983.

== About ==
He was born on 20 December 1928 in Chhota Gala, a village in Tehsil Rawalakot, District Poonch, Azad Kashmir. He received his education from Government High School Rawalakot and was commissioned into the Pakistan Army on 15 November 1958. He was awarded the Sitara-i-Imtiaz and the Sitara-e-Basalat.

In 1977, with the advice of all political parties, the Legislative Assembly of AJK and AJK Council had been dissolved while Sardar Muhammad Ibrahim Khan was the president. Major General Habib Ur Rahman was appointed the President of AJK. Shortly after, he resigned due to illness.

On 5 November 1977, martial law was declared in Azad Kashmir in the aftermath of the 1977 Pakistani military coup. Muhammad Hayat Khan, a brigadier at the time, was appointed the caretaker, and later the President of AJK.
