= Syed Ali Ahmed Shah =

President of Azad Jammu and Kashmir
- In office 30 May 1950 – 2 December 1951
- Preceded by: Sardar Muhammad Ibrahim Khan
- Succeeded by: Mirwaiz Yusuf Shah

Syed Ali Ahmed Shah was an Azad Kashmiri politician who served as President of Azad Kashmir from 30 May 1950 to 2 December 1951.
