= Mirwaiz Yusuf Shah =

Former Mirwaiz Kashmir (1894–1968)

Muhammad Yusuf Shah

President of Azad Kashmir
- In office 30 May 1956 – 8 September 1956
- Preceded by: Sher Ahmed Khan
- Succeeded by: Abdul Qayyum Khan
- In office 2 December 1951 – 18 May 1952
- Preceded by: Ali Ahmed Shah
- Succeeded by: Raja Haydar Khan (acting)

Mirwaiz of Kashmir
- In office 1931–1968
- Preceded by: Mirwaiz Atiq Ullah
- Succeeded by: Mirwaiz Maulvi Farooq

Personal details
- Born: 19 February 1894 Rajauri Kadal, Srinagar, Jammu and Kashmir, British India
- Died: 12 December 1968 (aged 74) Rawalpindi, Punjab, Pakistan
- Party: All Jammu and Kashmir Muslim Conference
- Relations: Mirwaiz Maulvi Farooq (nephew); Mirwaiz Atiq Ullah (uncle)
- Education: Darul Uloom Deoband

Mirwaiz Muhammad Yusuf Shah (19 February 1894 – 12 December 1968) was a religious leader and politician in the princely state of Jammu and Kashmir during the British Raj. He served as the Imam (head priest) of the Jama Masjid in Srinagar, a position that is also known as the "Mirwaiz of Kashmir" (chief preacher in Kashmir). He relegated the majority of his political career to opposing the Jammu & Kashmir National Conference of Sheikh Abdullah, including siding with Pakistan during the First Kashmir War. He moved to Azad Kashmir and eventually served as the president of Azad Kashmir.

== Early life ==
Yusuf Shah was born on 19 February 1894 (13 Shaban 1311 Hijri) at Rajauri kadal to Ghulam Rasool Shah. In 1925, Shah started his education with Darul Uloom Deoband, where he was taught the hadith by Anwar Shah Kashmiri. In 1931, he succeeded Attiqullah as the mirwaiz of Kashmir.

== Political career ==
In 1932, Mirwaiz Muhammad Yusuf Shah was among the founding leaders of the political party All Jammu and Kashmir Muslim Conference founded by Sheikh Abdullah and Chaudhry Ghulam Abbas. However, after a year, conflicts occurred between Abdullah and Muhammad Yusuf Shah. By the time of the 1934 elections for the Praja Sabha (legislative assembly), Yusuf Shah had formed a separate party called "Azad Muslim Conference". The party contested five Muslim seats in Srinagar, against the Muslim Conference, and lost all of them.

In order to expand the group, Abdullah wanted to allow people of other religions to join it. This was opposed by Muhammad Yusuf Shah who felt that he was "betraying the cause of the Muslims". Consequently, Abdullah founded the Jammu & Kashmir National Conference. However the Muslims of Kashmir felt that it was a representative body of the Indian National Congress.

As a result, under the leadership of Muhammad Yusuf Shah, Muslim Conference entered into an alliance with the All India Muslim League and in July 1947, the party passed a resolution demanding the accession of the state of Jammu and Kashmir to Pakistan based on "geographic, economic, linguistic, cultural and religious conditions".

In 1947, Mirwaiz Muhammad Yusuf Shah went to exile in Azad Kashmir. He has also been the president of Azad Kashmir twice, once in 1952 and another in 1956. He also served in the ministry of education.

On 12 December 1968, Mirwaiz Muhammad Yusuf Shah died at Rawalpindi.

== Literary works ==
Shah wrote the first Kashmiri translation and exegesis of Quran.

== Legacy ==
After Yusuf Shah's departure for Azad Kashmir, Sheikh Abdullah appointed Moulvi Atiqullah as the Mirwaiz. Upon Atiqullah's death in 1961, Yusuf Shah's nephew Moulvi Mohammad Farooq was appointed Naib Mirwaiz by Bakshi Ghulam Mohammad. After Yusuf Shah's death in 1968, Farooq became a full Mirwaiz.

Mirwaiz Umar Farooq said that Yusuf Shah represented and supported the Kashmiri people's political desires. He also said that contributions made by him are "unmatchable". Farooq also said that he also opposed the split of the Muslim Conference and pleaded for the resolution of the Kashmir issue in Pakistan and at international level.

== Bibliography ==
- Bose, Sumantra (2003), Kashmir: Roots of Conflict, Paths to Peace, Harvard University Press, ISBN 0-674-01173-2
- Copland, Ian (1981), "Islam and Political Mobilization in Kashmir, 1931-34", Pacific Affairs, 54 (2): 228–259, doi:10.2307/2757363, JSTOR 2757363
- Dalal, Sir Barjor (1935), "The Jammu and Kashmir State Assembly: First Session", Asiatic Review, 31: 137–147 – via archive.org
- Das Gupta, Jyoti Bhusan (2012) [first published 1968], Jammu and Kashmir, Springer, ISBN 978-94-011-9231-6
- Hussain, Syed Taffazull (2016), Sheikh Abdullah-A Biography: The Crucial Period 1905-1939. 2016 Edition, Syed Taffazull Hussain, ISBN 978-1-60481-603-7
- Khan, Ghulam Hassan (1980), Freedom movement in Kashmir, 1931-1940, Light & Life Publishers
- Korbel, Josef (1966) [first published 1954], Danger in Kashmir (second ed.), Princeton University Press, ISBN 9781400875238
- Saraf, Muhammad Yusuf (1977), Kashmiris Fight for Freedom, Volume 1, Ferozsons
  - Saraf, Muhammad Yusuf (2015) [first published 1977 by Ferozsons], Kashmiris Fight for Freedom, Volume 1, Mirpur: National Institute Kashmir Studies
