= Mohammad Ishaq Khan =

Kashmiri academic

- Born: January 9, 1946
- Died: April 5, 2013 (aged 67)
- Education: Kashmir University

Mohammad Ishaq Khan (9 January 1946 – 5 April 2013) was a Kashmiri academic and historian of Kashmir. He served as the dean of academics, dean of faculty of social sciences, professor, and head of the history department at Kashmir University.

== Biography ==
Ishaq Khan was the son of a businessman, Ghulam Ahmad Khan, who was part of the local hotel industry (Kashmir Guest House at Lal Chowk until 1978) in Kashmir. Being a staunch supporter of Sheikh Mohammad Abdullah, Ahmad Khan was jailed for his underground political activities and died on 4 April 1956 after his release. In his Weekly Khalid (April 1956), Khwaja Sadruddin Mujahid, editor, and jailmate of Ghulam Ahmad Khan along with Ghulam Mohiuddin Shah, alleged that the illness and subsequent death of his friend was caused by slow poisoning in the Central Jail of Srinagar (See Ishaq,Crisis of a Kashmiri Muslim: Spiritual and Intellectual). While from his father's family, Ishaq traces his genealogy to the Pathans of Rampur (See Ishaq Perspectives on Kashmir: Historical Dimensions, 1983, his mother belonged to the known family of Baigs who had settled around the Hariparbat Fort in Srinagar after the Mughal invasion of Kashmir in 1586. Ishaq's wife, Mahmooda Khan, taught English at the Tyndale Biscoe Memorial School, Srinagar for nearly four decades. His eldest son, Mohammad Aamir Khan (B.A. International Islamic University, Malaysia; M.A. Central University, Hyderabad) works at The Tribune.

== Education and work ==
Ishaq Khan completed his PhD under the supervision of Mohibbul Hasan in 1975. He was the first PhD of Kashmir University in the faculty of social sciences. Khan served as lecturer (from 1970 to 1982) and reader (from 1982 to1988) before being promoted to full professor of history at Kashmir University and held the post from 1988 to 2005.

He was nominated as Member of the Indian Council of Historical Research by the Government of India, and presided over the Punjab History Congress (Medieval Section) in 2001. He was elected to Senior Leverhulme Fellowship by the Oxford Centre for Islamic Studies in 1992, and was also offered a fellowship by St Cross College, Oxford.

Khan retired in 2005 and was made the director of the newly founded Institute for Kashmir Studies and later held the Shaikhul Alam Chair at Kashmir University until August 2008.

== Philosophical and political views ==
Ishaq Khan identifies himself as a researcher and a traveller in the Sufi Path who has always preferred to live in relative seclusion. His most widely read book Kashmir's Transition to Islam: The Role of Muslim Rishis has been described as a “pioneering” “authoritative”, and “seminal” work on the social dimension of Islam in Kashmir and “an important critique of the concept of ‘syncretism’.” As an Indian historian, he who has also written extensively against using Islam as an ideology. He regards Islam as essentially a faith rather than a politico-religious ideology. Although rooted in Sufism, Ishaq Khan at times has been critical of using jihad for political purposes. He was also critical of General S.K. Sinha, former governor of J&K, for his “saffronisation” agenda in Kashmir. He was removed as the first and founding Director of the Centre for Kashmir Studies, Kashmir University, for the views he expressed at the inaugural session of the newly founded UGC centre. Shortly, this centre was later acquired by the Indian Chapter of South Asia Foundation and renamed Institute of Kashmir Studies, thanks to Gen. Sinha's vested interest, as Chancellor of Kashmir University, in promoting “saffronisation” of Kashmir history. Such development on the campus turned Ishaq Khan into a rebel mystic poet. His Kashmir: Humanity Stifled, though an unknown poetical work, has much to say about the wrongs of contemporary Kashmir in terse verse. The noted Indian Professor of English and former Vice-Chancellor of Delhi University (South Campus), G.K. Das, describes Ishaq Khan as a “poet philosopher” in the prestigious journal: Indian Literature (May–June 2010). Ishaq Khan supports Gen. Mushraff's views on Kashmir. Although love for an independent Kashmir is reflected in his poetical compositions, Ishaq seems to favour the realistic solution of the Kashmir problem within the framework of the Indian constitution.

== Reception ==
His books and research articles have received critical recognition in prestigious academic journals of international repute in India and abroad including The Indian Historical Review; The American Historical Review; Studies in History; Oxford Journal of Islamic Studies; Pacific Affairs; Journal of Asian Studies; South Asia Research; The New York Review of Books; Indian Literature, The Indian Archives; Itihas; and scores of newsmagazines: Indian Book Chronicle; Bulletin Henry Martyn Institute; The Times of India; The Indian Express; The Hindu; Frontline; The Indian Foreign Review; The Hindustan Times; etc.

Historians, social scientists and littérateurs who have highlighted the contribution of Ishaq Khan to historical research in various publications are: Professors Mohibbul Hasan, T.N. Madan, Richard Maxwell Eaton, Harbans Mukhia, Mushirul Hasan, Christian W Troll, Barbara Metcalf, Gail Minaul, S. Gopal, Annemerie Schimmel, Ayesha Jalal, Sugata Bose, Mirdu Rai, Chitrilekha Zutshi, Frank Colonon, B.K. Majumdar, H.K. Naqvi, Gregory C. Kozlowski, Stephen Frederic Dale, Andrew Rippin, Trimothy G.Reagan, Juan Eduardo, Johan Elverskog, Anna Libera Dallapiccola, Stephaine Zingel, Knut A. Jacobsen, Carla Bellarny, Jamal Malik, Anna Aknsoy, Ali Sutaan Asami, Bhagwan Josh, P. Sahadevan.

The sociologist Professor T.N. Madan observed: “Khan chose to tread this straight but often difficult path of Islamic piety and the pursuit of knowledge many years ago, and has done so with steadfast step and distinction...I have high regard for Professor Mohammad Ishaq Khan and I greatly value his scholarly contributions.” Foreword to Crisis of a Kashmiri Muslim: Spiritual and Historical

The writer Pankaj Mishra writes :“Dr. Khan...has done pioneering work on Islam’s acculturation in the Hindu-Buddhist environment of Kashmir. He is a small, round-faced man, gentle in demeanor; he speaks slowly, as if unaccustomed to talking much of his work, but in clear qualified sentences that indicate a quietly active mind. During... the years of the insurgency...he has done his best work: a book on the spiritual dimensions of Islam that stressed the contemplative aspects of the faith over the ideological ones....Dr. Khan’s allegiance was to the Sufi tradition of Kashmir....His suspicion of Islam as ideology had only grown after the violence and suffering caused by the insurgency ... Dr. Khan (is) committed to the intellectual life ...” The New York Review of Books

== Death ==
After suffering a heart attack, Professor Khan was admitted to the SK Institute of Medical Sciences Intensive Care Unit, where he died on 5 April 2013. He was 67.

== Selected books ==
1. History of Srinagar, 1846–1947: A Study in Socio-Cultural Change (Aamir Publications, Srinagar, 1978; 2nd ed. Cosmos, Srinagar, 1999; 3rd ed. Gulshan, 2007)
2. Perspectives on Kashmir: Historical Dimensions (Gulshan Publishers, Srinagar, 1983)
3. Kashmir's Transition to Islam: The Role of Muslim Rishis (Manohar Publishers, New Delhi, 1994; paperback, 1997; 3rd edition 2002; 4th ed. published by Gulshan, Srinagar, 2005)
4. Experiencing Islam (Oxford University Press, Karachi; Sterling House, New Delhi; University Press, Dacca, 1997)
5. Crisis of a Kashmiri Muslim: Spiritual and Intellectual with a Foreword by Prof. T.N. Madan (Gulshan, Srinagar, 2008)
6. Biographical Dictionary of Sufism in South Asia (Manohar, New Delhi, 2009)
7. Kashmir: Humanity Stifled (Aamir Publications, Srinagar, 2007)
8. Sufis of Kashmir (Gulshan, 2011)
9. The Merited Invocation: English translation of Awrad-i Fathiyya of Mir Sayyid ‘Ali Hamadani with notes and annotations (forthcoming)

== Research articles ==
Mohammad Ishaq Khan has authored following research articles:

- "The Rishi Tradition and the Construction of Kashmiriyat", in Lived Islam in South Asia: Adaptation, Accommodation and Conflict, edited by Imtiaz Ahmad and Helmut Reifeld, New Delhi, 2004
- "Reflections on Time and History vis-à-vis the Quran" in Hamdard Islamicus, Vol. XXI.No. 3, 1998 (Hamdard Foundation of Pakistan, Karachi)
- "Kashmiri Muslims: Social and Identity Consciousness" in Comparative Studies of South Asia, Africa and the Middle East, Vol. XVI No.2 1996(Duke University, USA); also published in Mushirul Hasan, ed., Islam, Communities and the Nation, Manohar, New Delhi, 1998
- "A Study of Ritual Behaviour and its Impact on the evolution of Kashmiri Muslim Society" in Islam and Christian –Muslim Relations, Vol.5, No.1, 1994 (Selley Oak Colleges, Birmingham, United Kingdom)
- "The Impact of Islam on Kashmir in the Sultanate Period" in The Indian Economic and Social History Review, Vol 23, No. 2 (Delhi School of Economics, New Delhi, 1986 ); reprinted in Richard M. Eaton, Islamic Traditions in India, Oxford University Press, New Delhi.
- "Islam in Kashmir: Some distinctive features", in Islam in India, Vol.II.ed.Christian Troll( Vikas, New Delhi, 1986)
- "Kashmiri Response to Islam, 1320–1586" in Islamic Culture, Hyderabad, January, 1987
- "Persian Influences in Kashmir in the Sultanate Period" in Islamic Culture, Hyderabad, January, 1977
- "The Significance of the dargah of Hazratbal in the Socio-religious and political life of Kashmiri Muslims" in Muslim Shrines in India, ed. Christian W. Troll ( Oxford University Press, New Delhi, 1989); reprinted in T. N. Madan, ed., India’s Religions, Oxford University Press, New Delhi, 2007
- "Sufism In Indian History" in Muslim Shrines in India, ed. Christian W. Troll( Oxford University Press, New Delhi, 1989 )
- "The Mystical Career and Poetry of Nuruddin Rishi Kashmiri" in Studies in Islam, Jamia Hamdard, New Delhi, Jan/April 1982
- "Sources of the History of Kashmir" in Sources of Indian History, ed. S.P. Sen (Institute of Historical Studies, Calcutta, 1979)
- "The Societal Dimensions of the Mystical Philosophy of Nuruddin Rishi Kashmiri" in Proceedings of the Indian History Congress (Srinagar Session, 1986)
- "Studying Conversions to Islam in Indian History: A Case Study" in Journal: Institute of Muslim Minority Affairs, London, Vol. XII. No.1 January 1991
- "Six Centuries of Islamisation in Kashmir: Retrospect and Prospects" in 5000 Years of Kashmir, ed.Balraj Puri ( Ahanta, Delhi, 1997 )
- "Dynamics of Kashmiri Culture vis-a-vis Brahmanism and Islam" in Karakorum Hindukush-Himalaya : Dynamics of change ed. Irmtraud Stellrecht, 2 vols. (Rudiger Koppe Verlag Koln, Germany, 1998)
- "The Rishi Movement as a Social Force" in The Making of Indo-Persian Culture, ed. Muzaffar Alam, Francoise Delvoye, Marc Goborieau, Manohar, New Delhi, 2000); reprinted in David Lorenzen, ed., Religious Movements in South Asia (Oxford University Press, 2004)
- "The Evolution of Shari‘ah consciousness in Kashmir: An Interpretation of Mir Sayyid Ali Hamadani's Historical Role" in Journal of Pakistan Historical Society Shaheed Hakim Mohammad Said Number, vol.XLVII, Oct–Dec., 1999. No.4
- "Some Aspects of Islam in Kashmir", in War and Peace in Islam (Seminar Proceedings, Delhi Policy Group, 2002)
- "Shari‘a, Conversions & State in Medieval Kashmir", in Aparna Rao, ed., The Valley of Kashmir(Manohar, New Delhi, 2009)
- "Sinews of Sufism in Kashmir: Past and Present", Third Frame, Vol. 2. No. 1, Jamia Millia Islamia
- "Rationale for re-orientation of Attitudes Towards Islam in Medieval India", Proceedings of the Punjab History Conference, Punjabi University, Patiala, 2001
- "Evolution of My Identity vis-à-vis Islam and Kashmir" in The Parchment of Kashmir: History, Society, and Politics, ed. Nyla Ali Khan, Palgrave Macmillan, August 2012
