= Nowhatta =

Nowhatta Navyut
- city
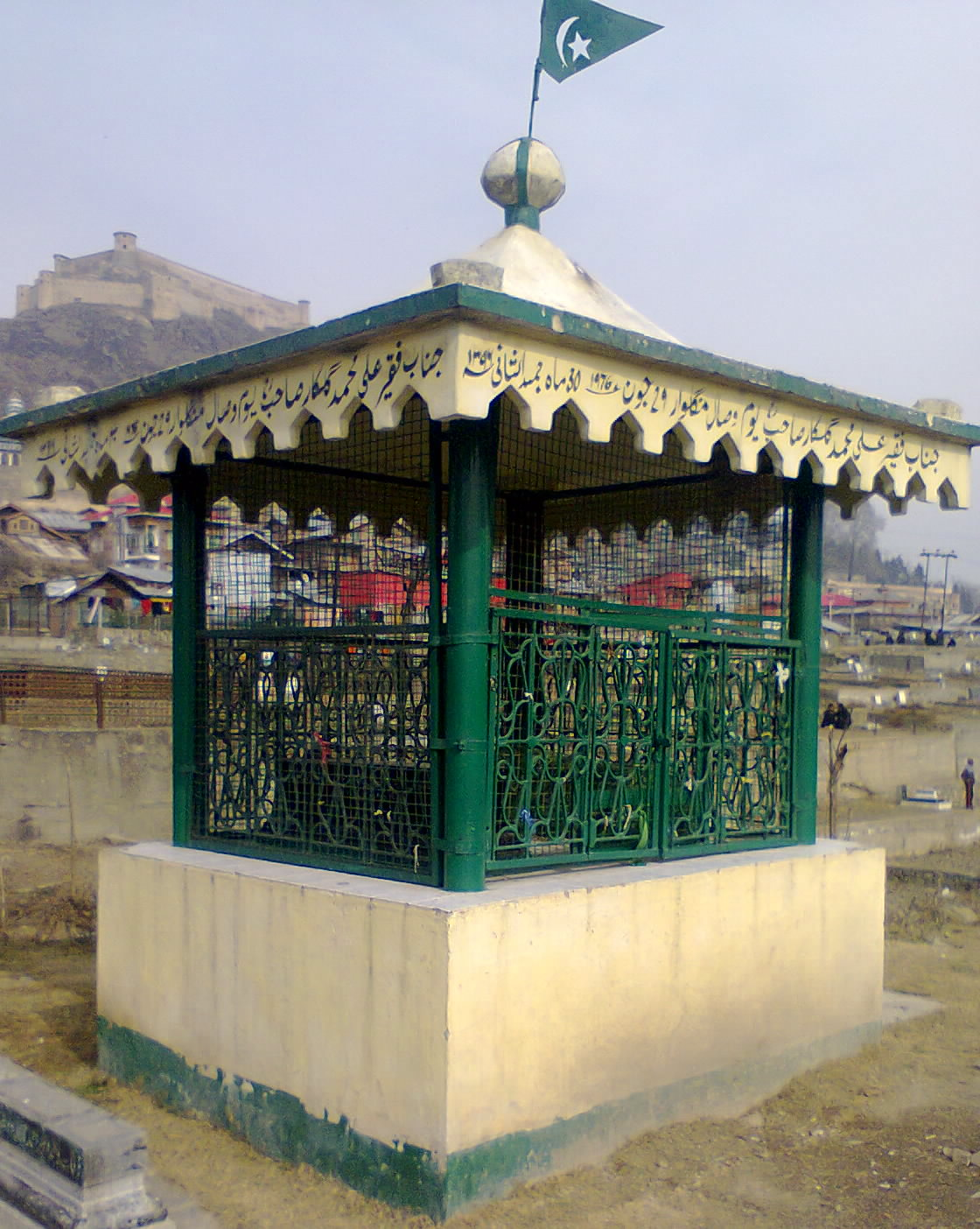
- Shrine of Gilkar Sahab R.A

- Location in Jammu & Kashmir, India Nowhatta (India)
- Coordinates: 34.10°N 74.81°E
- Country: India
- Union territory: Jammu & Kashmir
- District: Srinagar

Government
  - Type: Democratic
  - Body: Government of Jammu and Kashmir
- Elevation: 1,568 m (5,144 ft)

Languages
  - Official: Kashmiri, Urdu, Hindi, Dogri, English
- Time zone: UTC+5:30 (IST)

Nowhatta, (Urdu pronunciation: [nɔːɦəʈʈɑː]) known as Navyut (Kashmiri pronunciation: [naʋʲuʈ]) in Kashmiri, is a town of historical importance situated at a distance of 5 km from Lal Chowk, Srinagar in Jammu and Kashmir, India. Nowhatta is famous because of Historical Mosque known as Jamia Masjid. Nowhatta area has eighteen sub-communities Mohalla.

== History ==
Historically it has been the centre of various Islamic Universities during the period of Sultans. There are various shrines located in this area Ziyarat Naqshband Sahab Ziyarat Baha-ud-din Ganj Baksh Ziyarat Makdhoom Sahab Ziyarat Syed Hasari Sahab

Also located in the vicinity of this area is Martyrs Graveyard of 13 July 1931 martyrs, who fell to bullets of Dogra soldiers.

== Geography ==
Nowhata is located at 34.10°N 74.81°E. It has an average elevation of 1,568 metres (5,144 feet) above mean sea level.

The mountain, Hari Parbat, with historic significance is near and clearly visible form here.

== See also ==
- Hazratbal
