= President of Azad Kashmir =

Head of state of Azad Kashmir

President of Azad Jammu & Kashmir
- صدر آزاد جموں و کشمیر
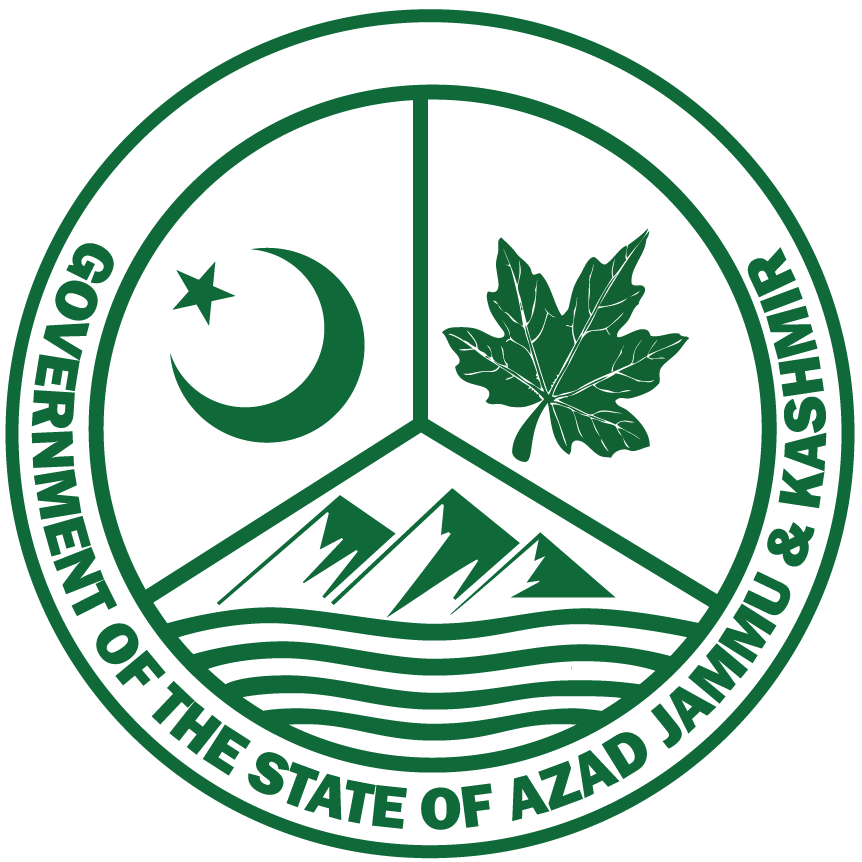
- Seal of the government

- State flag of the Azad Kashmir

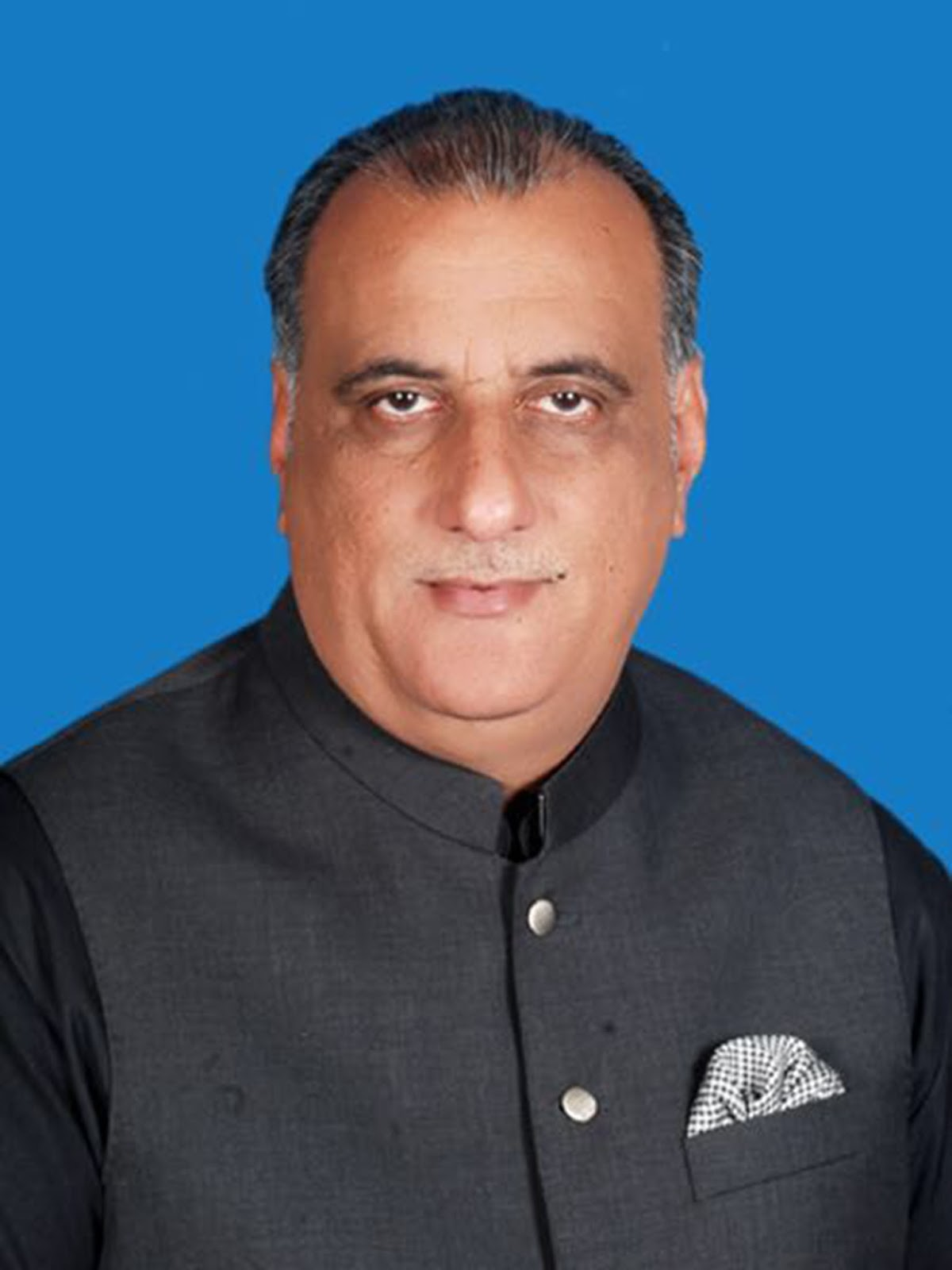
- Incumbent; Muhammad Najeeb Naqi Khan since 24 September 2026
- Government of Azad Kashmir
- Style: Honourable President (formal); His Excellency (diplomatic); Mr President (informal)
- Type: Head of state
- Abbreviation: Pres. AJK
- Member of: Azad Kashmir Legislative Assembly
- Residence: President House, Muzaffarabad
- Seat: President Secretariat, Muzaffarabad
- Appointer: Azad Jammu and Kashmir Legislative Assembly
- Term length: 5 years; renewable
- Constituting instrument: Interim Constitution of Azad Kashmir
- Precursor: Monarch of the Princely State of Jammu and Kashmir
- Inaugural holder: Sardar Ibrahim Khan (1947–1950)
- Formation: 24 October 1947; (75 years ago)
- Deputy: No fixed position; however held by Speaker of Legislative Assembly in President's absence
- Website: www.presidentajk.gov.pk

The President of Azad Kashmir, (Note: Urdu: صدرِ آزاد کشمیر, romanized: s̤adr-ē Āzād Kaśmīr, pronounced [s̤ə'dr-e: a:'za:d kə'ʂmi:r]) officially the President of the State of Azad Jammu and Kashmir, (Note: Urdu: صدرِ آزاد کشمیر, romanized: s̤adr-ē Riyāsat-ē Āzād Jammūñ ō Kaśmīr) is the head of state of Azad Kashmir, a territory administered by Pakistan. The president is the nominal head of executive and the legislative assembly, serving as a ceremonial figurehead. He is constitutionally bound to act on advice of the prime minister and the cabinet.

The president is elected by the Azad Jammu and Kashmir Legislative Assembly for a term of five years, under the provisions of the Azad Jammu & Kashmir (Interim Constitution) Act, 1974.

== Powers of the president of Azad Jammu and Kashmir ==
- Executive powers: Related to appointments, removals, issuing orders, and administering oaths.
- Judicial powers: Pertaining to the Supreme Court and High Court of Azad Kashmir.
- Legislative powers: Concerning the Legislative Assembly of the state.
- Emergency powers: Related to the declaration and management of emergencies.

== Executive powers ==
The president of Azad Jammu and Kashmir is the constitutional and ceremonial head of state. All executive powers are exercised by the Government of Azad Jammu and Kashmir, consisting of the prime minister and the cabinet, on his behalf, and he is bound to act on their advice. He also serves as the vice chairman of the Azad Jammu and Kashmir Council. The president, on the advice of the prime minister, may make rules for carrying out the purposes of the Constitution and can promulgate orders based on the advice of the prime minister, ministers, or relevant authorities.

In the event of the Prime Minister’s death, resignation, removal, or other incapacitation, the President appoints the senior-most minister as Acting Prime Minister. Additionally, he appoints a Plebiscite Adviser in the state, the Advocate General on the advice of the Prime Minister, and the Auditor General on the advice of the Chairman of the Council. He also appoints the Chief Election Commissioner after consulting with both the Prime Minister and the Leader of the Opposition, and he selects members and the Chairman of the Council of Islamic Ideology on the advice of the Prime Minister.

The President appoints the Chairman of the Azad Jammu and Kashmir Public Service Commission on the advice of the Prime Minister and serves as Chancellor of the public sector universities in the region, where he appoints Vice Chancellors based on the recommendations of relevant authorities. Lastly, the President administers the oath to the Prime Minister and members of the cabinet, including ministers and advisers.

== Judicial Powers ==
The President appoints the Chief Justice of the Supreme Court of Azad Jammu and Kashmir and the Chief Justice of the High Court of Azad Jammu and Kashmir. He also appoints judges of the Supreme Court and the High Court on the advice of the Council. In the absence of the Chief Justice, the President may appoint Acting Chief Justices for both the Supreme Court and the High Court, and he may also appoint additional judges to the High Court and ad hoc judges to the Supreme Court and High Court.

The Aalim Judge of the Shariat Appellate Bench of the High Court is appointed by the President on the advice of the Prime Minister and after consultation with the Chief Justice of the Supreme Court and the Chief Justice of the High Court. The President has the authority to remove judges of the Supreme Court and High Court based on the recommendations of the Supreme Judicial Council.

If the Chairman of the Council or the President seeks the opinion of the Supreme Court of Azad Jammu and Kashmir on any question of law that is considered of public importance, the President may refer the question to the Supreme Court for reconsideration. The President also has the power to grant pardons, reprieves, and respites, and to remit, suspend, or commute any sentence passed by any court, tribunal, or other authority.

Additionally, the President administers the oath to the Chief Justice of the Supreme Court and the High Court of Azad Kashmir.

== Legislative Powers ==
A bill can only become an act when the President of the state assents to it or it is deemed assented after the passage of a certain period. The President has the authority to summon and prorogue sessions of the Legislative Assembly of the state. He can dissolve the Legislative Assembly on the advice of the Prime Minister.

When the Legislative Assembly is not in session, the President can promulgate ordinances, provided he is satisfied with the need for such action, on the advice of the Prime Minister or the cabinet. The President may also address the Assembly and send messages to it.

All proceedings of the Assembly are to be conducted in accordance with the rules of procedure made by the Assembly and approved by the President. The Speaker of the Assembly may resign from office by submitting a written resignation to the President.

The President signs the finance bill approved by the Legislative Assembly and also signs any constitutional amendment bill for the state of Azad Jammu and Kashmir.

== Emergency Powers ==
According to Article 53 of the Interim Constitution of Azad Jammu and Kashmir, the President can issue a proclamation of emergency on the advice of the Chairman of the Council when the security of Azad Jammu and Kashmir is threatened by war, external aggression, or internal disturbances. During the emergency, the President has the authority to suspend the fundamental rights of the state's citizens.

== List of presidents ==
The following individuals have served as Presidents of Azad Kashmir:

#	Image	Name	Took office	Left office	Party
1		Sardar Ibrahim Khan	24 Oct 1947	12 May 1950	All Jammu and Kashmir Muslim Conference
2		Ali Ahmed Shah	13 May 1950	4 Dec 1951	Military
3		Mirwaiz Yusuf Shah	5 Dec 1951	20 May 1952	All Jammu and Kashmir Muslim Conference
[A]		Raja Haydar Khan (interim)	18 May 1952	21 Jun 1952	-
4		Sher Ahmed Khan	21 Jun 1952	30 May 1956	Military
5		Mirwaiz Yusuf Shah (2)	30 May 1956	8 Sep 1956	All Jammu and Kashmir Muslim Conference
6		Sardar Abdul Qayyum	8 Sep 1956	13 Apr 1957	All Jammu and Kashmir Muslim Conference
7		Sardar Ibrahim Khan (2)	13 Apr 1957	30 Apr 1959	All Jammu and Kashmir Muslim Conference
8		Khurshid Hasan Khurshid	1 May 1959	7 Aug 1964	Jammu and Kashmir Liberation League
9		Abdul Hamid Khan	7 Aug 1964	7 Oct 1969	-
[A]		Abdul Rahman Khan (interim)	7 Oct 1969	30 Oct 1970	Military
10		Sardar Abdul Qayyum (2)	30 Oct 1970	16 Apr 1975	All Jammu and Kashmir Muslim Conference
[A]		Sheikh Manzar Masaud (interim)	16 Apr 1975	5 Jun 1975	
11		Sardar Ibrahim Khan (3)	5 Jun 1975	30 Oct 1978	Azad Muslim Conference
12		Muhammad Hayat Khan	30 Oct 1978	1 Feb 1983	Military
13		Abdul Rahman Khan	1 Feb 1983	1 Oct 1985	Military
14		Sardar Abdul Qayyum (3)	1 Oct 1985	20 Jul 1991	All Jammu and Kashmir Muslim Conference
[A]		Muhammad Ishaq Zaffar (interim)	20 Jul 1991	29 Jul 1991	Pakistan Peoples Party
[A]		Abdul Rashid Abbasi (interim)	29 Jul 1991	12 Aug 1991	-
15		Sardar Sikandar Hayat	12 Aug 1991	12 May 1996	All Jammu and Kashmir Muslim Conference
[A]		Abdul Rashid Abbasi (interim)	12 May 1996	22 May 1996	-
16		Sardar Sikandar Hayat (2)	23 May 1996	11 Aug 1996	All Jammu and Kashmir Muslim Conference
[A]		Abdul Rashid Abbasi (interim)	11 Aug 1996	25 Aug 1996	-
17		Sardar Ibrahim Khan (4)	25 Aug 1996	25 Aug 2001	Jammu Kashmir Peoples Party
18		Sardar Anwar Khan	25 Aug 2001	25 Aug 2006	All Jammu and Kashmir Muslim Conference
19		Raja Zulqarnain Khan	25 Aug 2006	25 Aug 2011	All Jammu and Kashmir Muslim Conference
20		Sardar Yaqoob Khan	25 Aug 2011	25 Aug 2016	Pakistan Peoples Party
21		Masood Khan	25 Aug 2016	25 Aug 2021	Pakistan Muslim League (N)
22		Sultan Mehmood Chaudhry	25 Aug 2021	31 Jan 2026	Pakistan Tehreek-e-Insaf
[A]		Chaudhry Latif Akbar (acting)	31 Jan 2026	25 Aug 2026	Pakistan People's Party
[A]		Chaudhry Tariq Farooq (acting)	25 Aug 2026	24 Sep 2026	Pakistan Muslim League (N)
23		Muhammad Najeeb Naqi Khan	24 Sep 2026		Pakistan Muslim League(N)

== See also ==
- Prime Minister of Azad Kashmir
- Government of Azad Kashmir
- List of current Pakistani governors
- List of current Pakistani chief ministers
- List of chief ministers of Jammu and Kashmir
