= Muhammad Ishaq Khattak =

Pakistani politician

- Born: March 3, 1944 (age 82); Nowshera, Khyber PakhtunKhwa, Pakistan
- Education: University of Engineering and Technology
- Alma mater: Johns Hopkins University
- Occupations: Engineer, Politician
- Political party: Pakistan Tehreek-e-insaf
- Spouse: Jameela Jan Khattak
- Children: 2

Engineer Muhammad Ishaq Khattak (born 4 March 1944) is a Pakistani politician who served as caretaker Provincial Minister for Communication and Works, IT, Transport, Auqaf, Hajj & Minorities affairs from March 2013 to June 2013. Khattak was passionate about research, and supported the idea of using marketing to publicise research carried out by Pakistani researchers. During his tenure as Caretaker Minister, Khattak openly criticised the misuse of transport by officials. He suggested that a proper record should be maintained in accordance with official rules and regulations. Khattak also initiated electronic tendering in the Communications and Works department for transparency and competition.

In March, 2016 he was appointed as Election Coordinator for Peshawar region by Pakistan Tehreek-e-Insaf, Provincial Election Commission. Soon after which he was appointed as Regional Coordinator by Pakistan Tehreek-e-Insaf.

== Biography ==
Engineer Muhammad Ishaq Khattak was born on 4 March 1944, in Dag Ismail Kheil, Pabbi, Nowshera. He is father to one son Saad Ishaq Khattak and one daughter Maria Ishaq Khattak. Both his children are Dentists. Muhammad Ishaq Khattak received his early education at the Government High School no.2 in Peshawar, and later was educated at Islamia College Peshawar. He subsequently joined University of Engineering and Technology Peshawar, in 1967. After graduating from University of Engineering and Technology, Khattak became a P.E.C member with Pakistan Council of Engineering. Soon after in 1974 Khattak attended Johns Hopkins University and Northwestern University in the United States of America for his post-graduate qualifications.

Before entering Politics in 2001, Khattak started his early career and joined Military Engineering Services Pakistan working on projects in collaboration with Swissboring Overseas Co. Ltd. Furthermore, he worked with the famous Greek architect Constantinos Apostolou Doxiadis from Doxiadis Associates to design the University of Lahore campus. In 1971 he worked as an Assistant Executive Engineer at Quaid-i-Azam University campus Islamabad planned and designed by Edward Durell Stone. He was also the Managing Director for Pakistan Industrial Development Corporation from October, 1991 until November, 1995. He was then appointed as Director Planning and Development for the Ministry of Industries and Production from November, 1995 until December 2000.

In the above-mentioned capacities of engineering cadre he planned, executed projects, engaged consultants, invited comparative tendering, finalized reports and conditions of awards. Moreover, he approved or recommended award of work nationally as well as internationally.

Engineer Muhammad Ishaq Khattak along with his wife Jamila Jan Khattak successfully founded Country Grammar School and College, Peshawar from 1991 - 2009. Even though this was a private institute, Khattak and his wife awarded hundreds of free school placements to Afghan refugees and students from lower socio-economic groups over a period of 19 years.

He has been a member of Rotary International since 2001, in recognition of his philanthropic work he received the title of Chartered secretary in 2014.
