= Muhammad Ishaq (historian) =

Bangladeshi historian and academic

- Born: 1910
- Died: 2005 (aged 94–95)
- Education: University of Dhaka

Muhammad Ishaq (1910 – 2005) was a Bangladeshi historian and academic.

== Biography ==
Ishaq was born in 1910, into a Bengali Muslim family in Hashimpur, Kandirpara, Ramganj, then part of the Noakhali District in Bengal Presidency. He completed his postgraduate studies in from University of Dhaka in 1937. He came into contact with Ramesh Chandra Majumdar, Kalika Ranjan Kanungo, Nalini Kanta Bhattasali, Mohitlal Majumdar, Charuchandra Bandopadhyay and Muhammad Shahidullah. He was the cultural secretary of the Salimullah Muslim Hall. He was the editor of his hall magazine too. During his student life he won the championship in the All India and Burma Inter University Debating Competition. He also joined Shikha Movement of Muslim Sahitya Samaj. Kazi Abdul Wadud was his teacher during his college life. He was influenced by him. He read a paper on a session of Muslim Sahitya Samaj titled Trends of Modern Bengali Lyric Poetry. This session was presided by Sarat Chandra Chattopadhyay.

Ishaq joined the University of Dhaka as a lecturer in 1937. Later, he quit the job and joined Education Service of Bengal. He worked as a professor in six government colleges. Government Azizul Haque College. He turned this college into a premier university college.

Ishaq conducted research of the Sylhet region. He presented papers at annual conferences of the Pakistan Historical Society too. He was a member of the Pakistan Historical Records and Archives Commission. At the end of his service career he edited District Gazetteers from 1966 to 1972.

Ishaq established Professor Muhammad Ishaq Trust Fund in 1987. The opening capital of this trust fund BDT 1,00,000. It works to promote research on the history of Bengal up to 1947. It also arranges an annual lecture by a historian.

Ishaq involved in writing text books too. He wrote 40 text books. Most of them are books on history. Some of these books were regarded as the best history text books ever written for school students in Bangladesh. In 1952 one of his books was sent to an exhibition of the World’s Best Books for Children in London.

Ishaq died in 2005.
