= Jamia Masjid, Srinagar =

Mosque in Srinagar, Kashmir

Jamia Masjid
- Kashmiri: بٔڈ مٔشیٖد
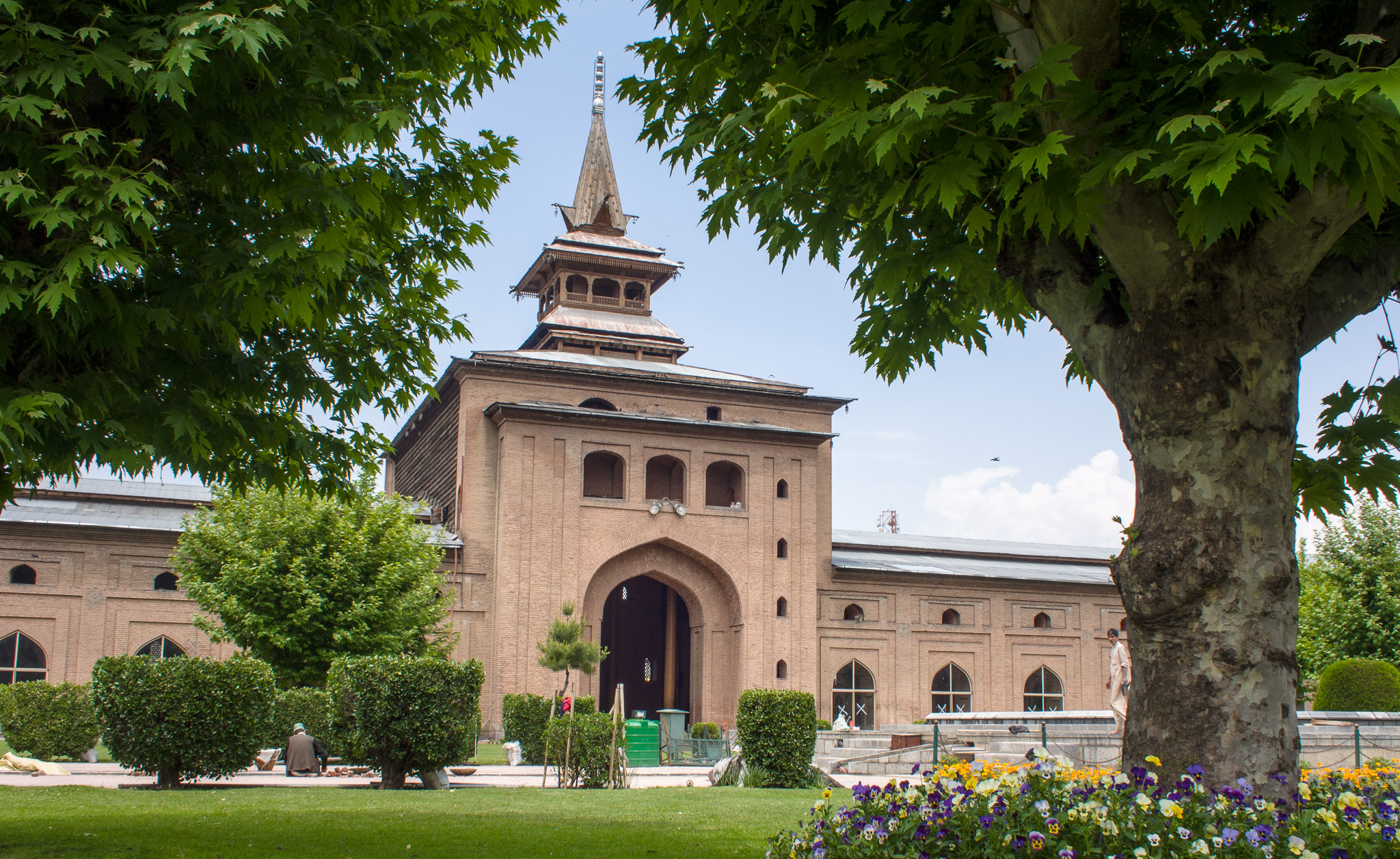
- A view of eastern entrance

- Location of the mosque in Jammu & Kashmir

Religion
- Affiliation: Islam
- Ecclesiastical or organisational status: Mosque
- Governing body: Anjuman e Auqaaf Jamia Masjid Srinagar
- Patron: Mirwaiz e Kashmir
- Status: Active

Location
- Location: Naiyut, Nowhatta, Srinagar, Jammu & Kashmir
- Country: India
- Coordinates: 34°05′54″N 74°48′33″E

Architecture
- Type: Mosque architecture
- Style: Persian; Koshur
- Founder: Sikandar Shah Miri
- Completed: 1402 CE

Specifications
- Capacity: 33,333 worshippers
- Length: 117 m (384 ft)
- Width: 116 m (381 ft)
- Dome: 4 (turrets)
- Materials: Deodar, stones, bricks

The Jamia Masjid (Kashmiri: بٔڈ مٔشیٖد) is a Friday mosque located at Nowhatta in the Old City of Srinagar, in the Indian union territory of Jammu and Kashmir. The mosque was commissioned by Sultan Sikandar in 1394 CE and completed in 1402 CE, at the behest of Mir Mohammad Hamadani, the son of Mir Sayyid Ali Hamadani, and is regarded as one of the most important mosques in Kashmir. It is located in a central zone in the religio-political life of Srinagar, and is headed by the mirwaiz of Kashmir.

The mosque has been the site of anti-Indian protests over generations, and has become a platform for people to debate and discuss the politics of the Kashmir conflict.

== History ==
=== Sikh Era (1819–1846) ===
For 24 years, the mosque faced closure under the Sikh Empire of maharaja Ranjit Singh beginning in 1819, when the-then governor of Kashmir, Moti Ram, put curbs on offering prayers in Jamia Masjid. No prayers were offered and no call for prayers was given from the mosque. It was reopened by the governor Shaikh Muhy-ud-Din in 1843, who spent nearly a lakh and a half of rupees on its repair and permitted calling for prayers. For 11 years, rulers allowed prayers only on Fridays. The mosque was opened for just few hours on Fridays and closed again.

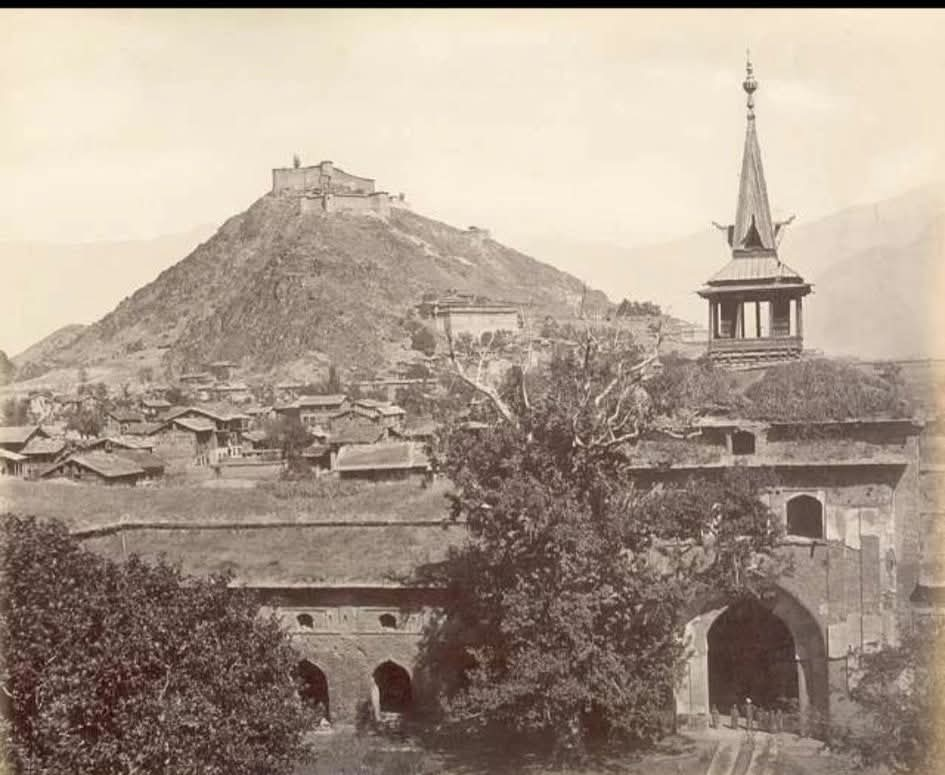
Jamia Masjid Srinagar in c. 1870s

=== 1931 Kashmir agitation ===
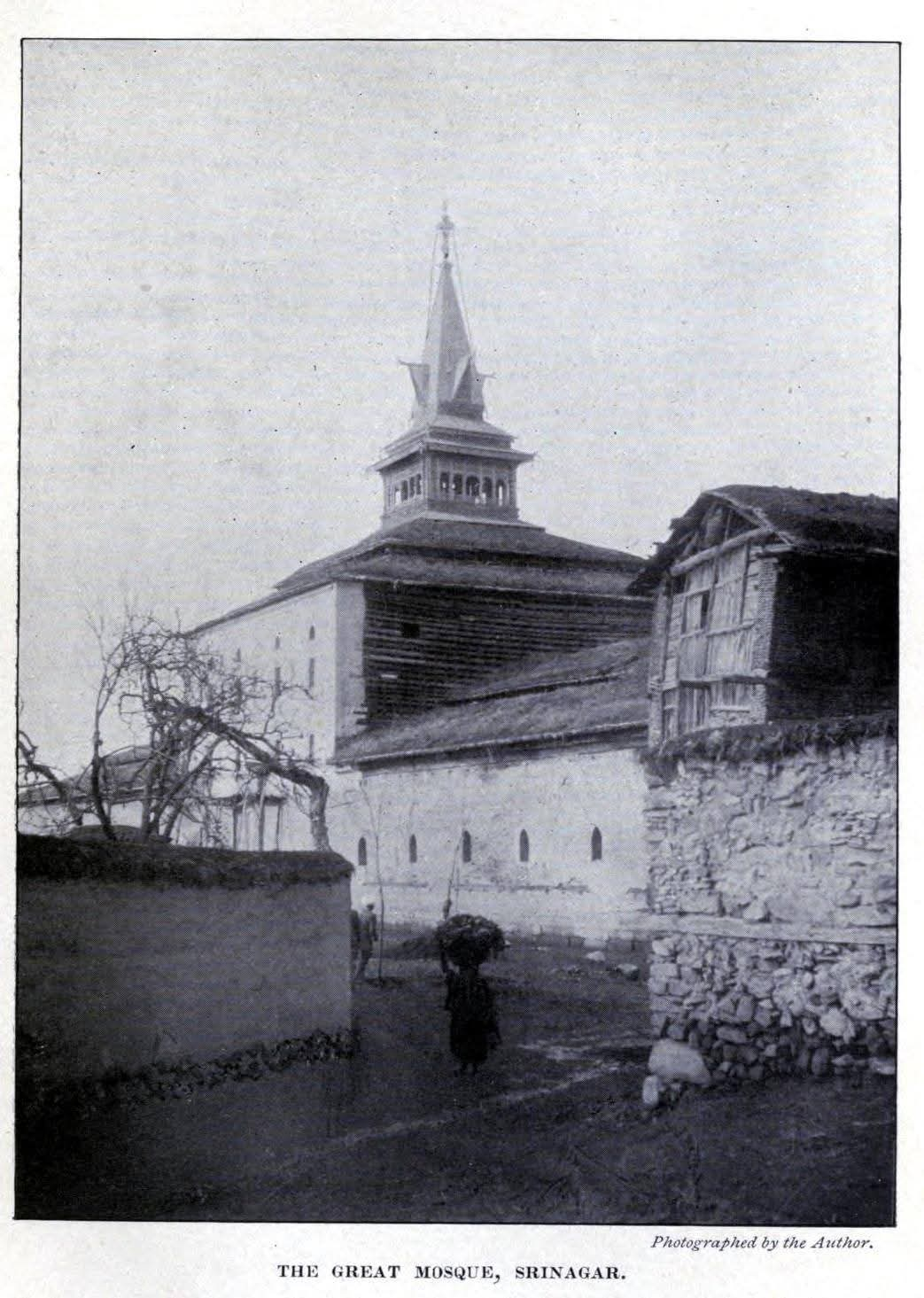
Jamia Masjid Srinagar in 1906

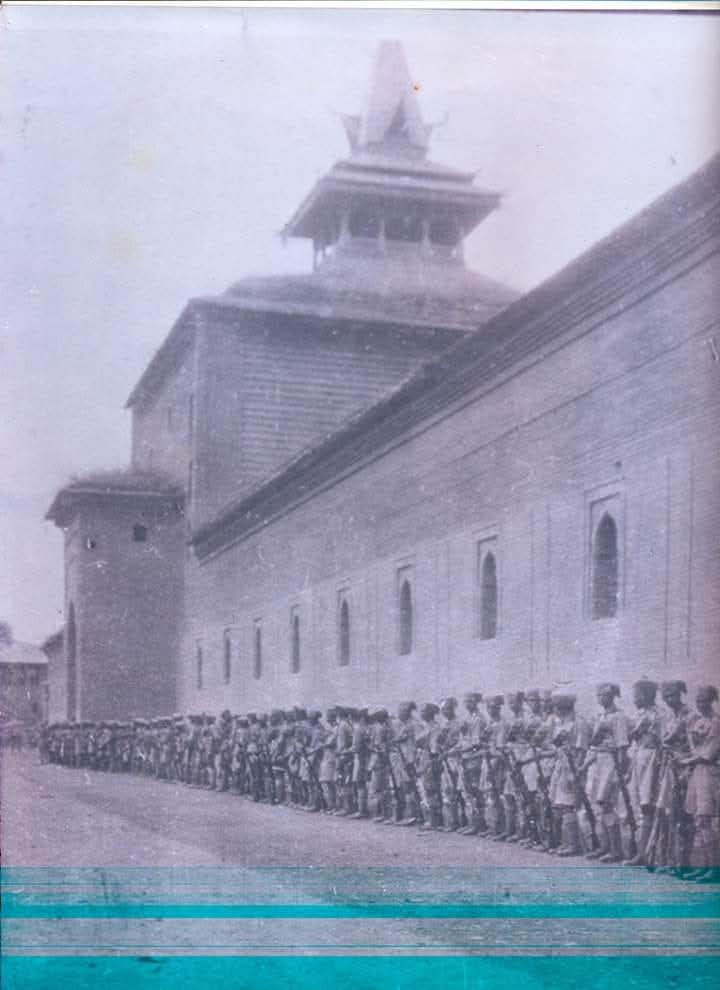
Jamia Masjid siege by Dogra forces in 1931

During the 1931 Kashmir agitation, a funeral was held in the Jamia Masjid for 22 Kashmiri Muslim protestors who were killed by the Dogra police. The bodies of the victims were laid in the shrine compound of Khawaja Naqashband Sahab in Khawaja Bazar, Srinagar where Sheikh Abdullah, maulvi Muhammad Yusuf Shah and other leaders delivered speeches against Dogra maharaja Hari Singh.

=== Post 1947 ===
According to historian Mohammad Ishaq Khan, “Jamia Masjid has primarily played a significant part in imparting religious education. However, with the spread of modern education among Kashmiri Muslims, thanks to the efforts of Mirwaiz Ghulam Rasul Shah, the Masjid began to play a seminal role in the growth of political consciousness. Sheikh Muhammad Abdullah was, in fact, initiated into what I would call the mysteries of Kashmiri Muslim politics at Jamia Masjid by Mirwaiz Muhammad Yusuf Shah.”

The Jamia Masjid has been a hot-bed of political discourse on the present turmoil in the state, and the politics that has unfolded in Kashmir has led to curbs and gags on congregations here. The mosque has also become a platform for people to debate and discuss the politics of the Kashmir conflict.

Prolonged closure of the mosque came into effect in 2008 when the Amarnath land row erupted. The decision of the state government to prevent people from offering Friday prayers for weeks led to massive outrage, and was seen as an attempt to choke the rebellion whose epicentre was the areas of the old city, particularly around Jamia Masjid.

During the Mehbooba Mufti-led coalition government, the mosque was again locked down for three months during the unrest of 2016, and again in 2017 and 2018 for different periods of time.

=== 2018 desecration ===
On 28 December 2018, a group of masked young men stormed into the mosque with ISIS flags after Friday congregational prayers, when the mosque was nearly empty, and a video of the incident went viral on social media. The incident became highly publicised and provoked condemnation from a wide range of organisations and public figures, including the mosque's Mirwaiz and the chief minister of the state. A day to "purify" the mosque, and another to reiterate its importance and sanctity, were observed the following week.

=== Since bifurcation ===
After the revocation of the erstwhile state's special status, and its bifurcation into two union territories, on 5 August 2019, including the rise of COVID-19 pandemic in Kashmir, the government imposed restrictions on prayers for 136 days.

== Architecture ==
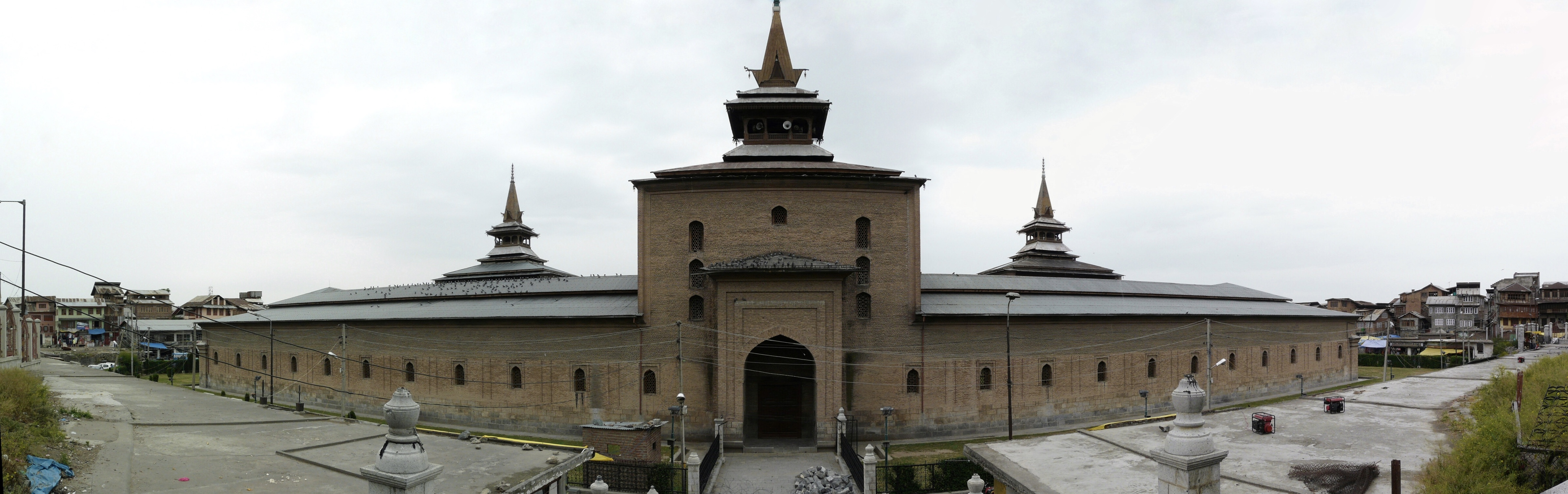
The eastern façade of the mosque

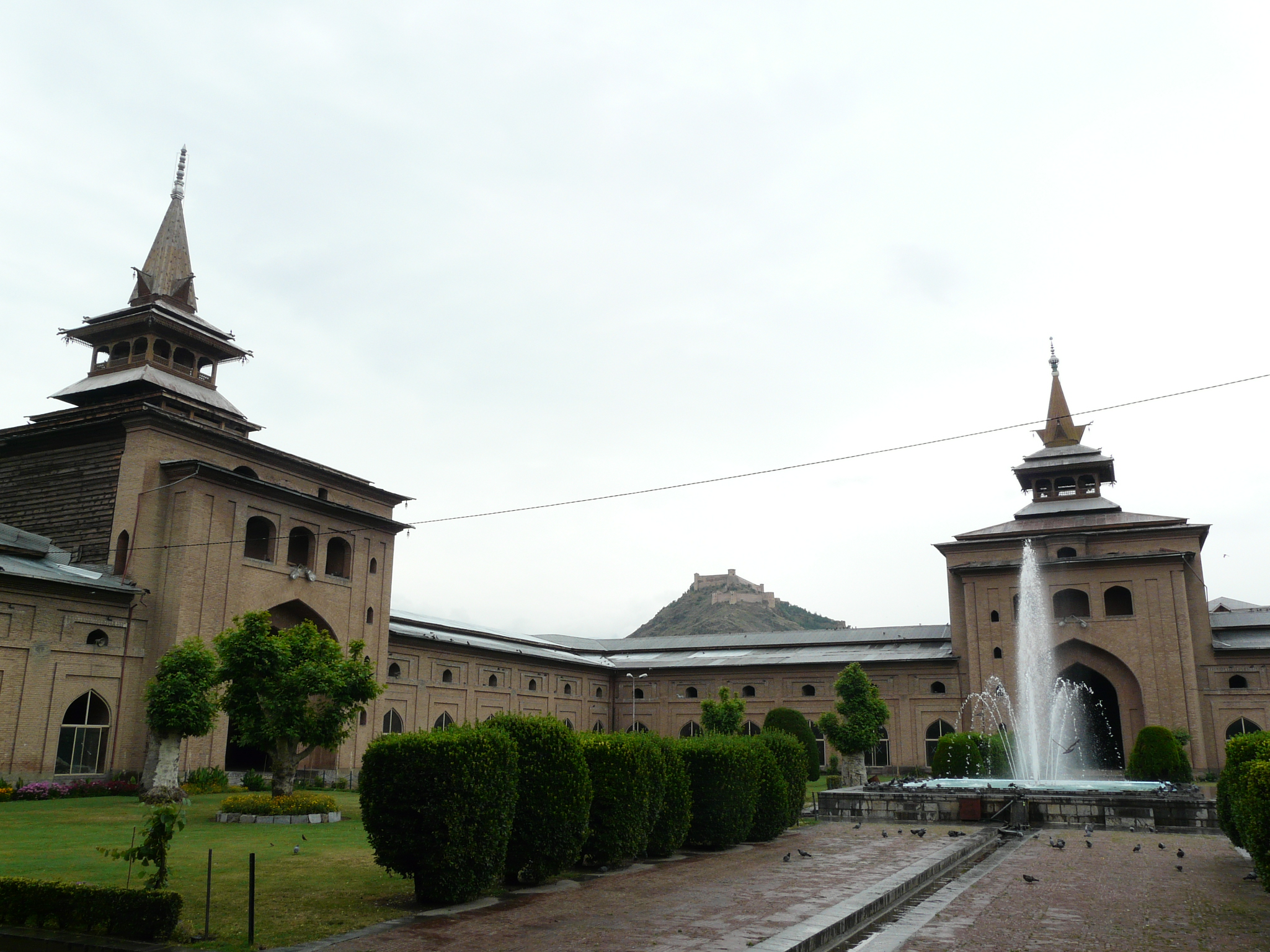
The courtyard of the Jamia Masjid, Srinagar. Hari Parbat is visible in the background.

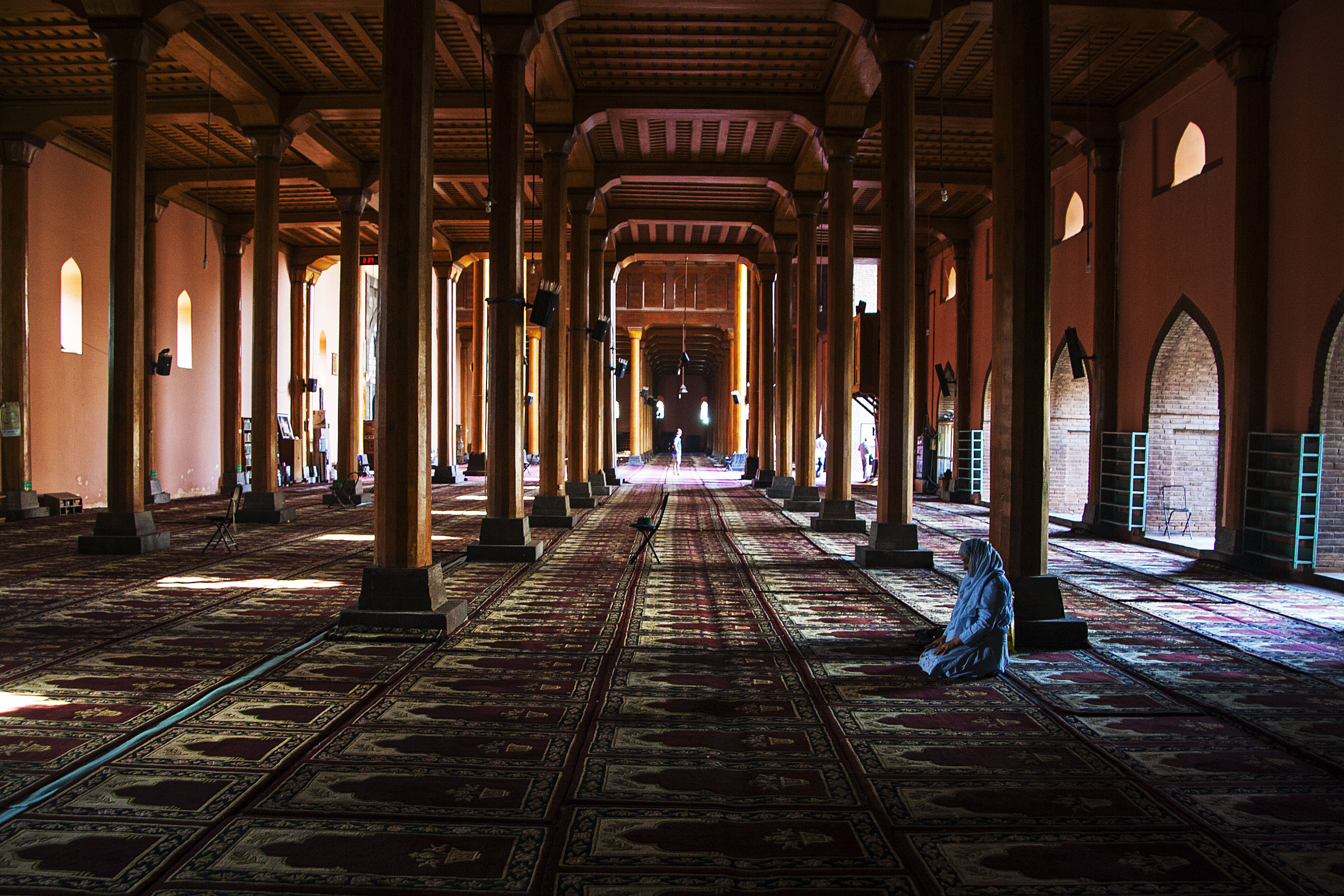
Part of the prayer hall inside the mosque

The Jamia Masjid is heavily influenced by Persian architecture, with similarities to the Buddhist pagodas. The structure occupies is quadrangular in shape with four turrets. These are in the middle of each side and covered with pyramidal roofs. All of the turrets are interconnected by spacious halls, with bright yellow poppies lining the mossy brick paths and the entire structure is surrounded by wide lanes on all four sides and has a square garden in the middle. The entrance on the southern side of the Mosque comprises a recessed portico which further leads onto an inner courtyard. This courtyard is based on the traditional Chaar Bagh plan and has a tank in the centre. The entire courtyard is made up of pointed arched, brick arcade. The court which was originally planted with a series of chinars is enclosed by arched liwans (cloisters) covered with two tiered sloping roof.

On the western and eastern sides, the mosque is 116 metres (381 ft) in length while the northern and southern sides are 117 metres (384 ft) long. Another source says that it is 120 meters by 120 meters. The inner courtyard measures 114 by 113 metres (375 by 370 ft) having a 10-by-10-metre (33 by 34 ft) water tank with a fountain flowing in the centre. Thus the space area of the mosque is 13,600 square metres (146,000 sq ft).

Its walls, made of burnt bricks, are over 1.2 metres (4 ft) thick. The lower portion of the walls is made of rectangular stones. There are three big entrance gates on north, south and eastern sides of the mosque confronting three turrets standing on lofty columns of deodar wood. The eastern side has a large entrance called the Shah Gate which is covered with a pyramidal roof surmounted by a square open pavilion (brangh) with a spire on top. A total of 378 wooden columns support the roof. Each turret is supported by eight lofty pillars 15 metres (48 ft) high and 1.8 metres (6 ft) in girth. The mihrab too has a similar turret over it. The remaining interior of the Mosque has 346 columns 6.4 metres (21 ft) high and 1.5 metres (5 ft) in girth. Initially the roof was covered with birch bark and clay. The western wall of the cloister has a mihrab made of black Kashmiri marble which is adorned with calligraphic work and has the ninety-nine attributes of Allah engraved on it.

The mosque can hold 33,333 worshippers in addition to the Imam but upto 100,000 people can offer prayers together at a peak.

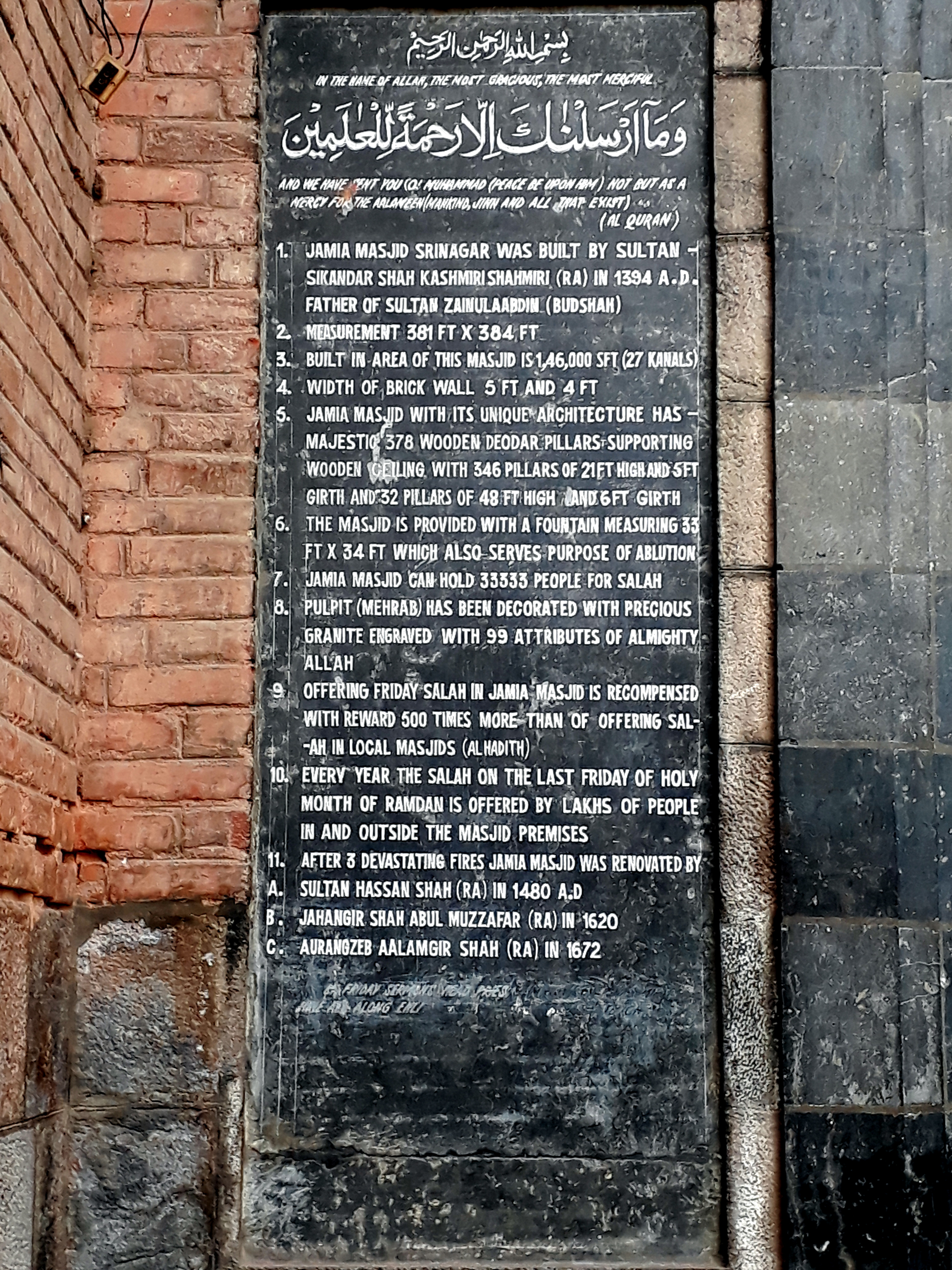
Plaque of Jamia Masjid

The walls of the four turrets have interior stairs in the circular form that end in the lounges of each turret which lead to the mosque's roof. The city of Srinagar can be viewed from these high turrets. The roof is constructed out of timber and iron bars. The birch bark over the roof is now replaced by corrugated iron sheets. The inner courtyard of the mosque has a water fountain, that is used for ablution, with four lawns around it decorated with chinar trees. The water tank in the courtyard was originally fed by a water channel known as Lachma Kual.

== Reconstructions ==
The mosque was subject to much destruction due to the damage caused by fires, and was partially or completely destroyed by devastating fires three times, and was restored after every disaster. The existing construction was erected by Mughal emperor Aurangzeb in 1672 CE. The reconstructions and major renovations in mosque's history have been conducted by:

- Sultan Sikandar in 796 AH (1393/1394 CE): The Sultan commissioned the construction of the mosque in 1394 CE and it was completed in 1402 CE.
- Sultan Hasan Shah in 885 AH (1480/1481 CE): The first fire that damaged it was in 1479, and the then ruler, Sultan Hasan Shah, immediately began the reconstruction work. He died before the repair work was done, and the task was taken over by Ibrahim Magre, the Commander-in-Chief of Kashmir forces under the rule of Muhammad Shah and Fateh Shah and completed it by 1503 CE.
- Jehangir in 1083 AH (1672/1673 CE): After facing another fatal destruction because of fire during the supremacy of Mughal Emperor Jehangir, the mosque was re-constructed under an architect-historian based in Kashmir, namely, Malik Haider of Tsodur. The entire repair work took 17 years to complete.
- Aurangzeb in 1672 CE: The third fire that distorted the structure was during the reign of Aurangzeb. It is said that when Aurangzeb heard about the accident, he only inquired if the chinars were safe, for 'the mosque could be rebuilt in a short time. A full-grown chinar can never be replaced.' He got together all the bricklayers and masons of the city, and Jamia Masjid was restored within three years.

During his reign, Sultan Zain-ul-Abidin extended the mosque and constructed a turret in the primary structure. The last restoration work was carried out under the reign of Maharaja Pratap Singh. Singh encouraged the reconstruction of the mosque many times and even offered financial assistance. However, all the renovations were carried out to reflect the original architecture and to retain the historic value of the mosque that it has carried through centuries.

== Maintenance ==
The Jamia Masjid falls under the domain of Anjuman-e-Auqaf, a private enterprise. The caretaker board of the mosque was constituted in 1975. Major source of revenue comes from the rent of 278 shops (owned by the Auqaf) around the Mosque and other sources of public funding. The revenue is not fixed and varies annually. Before the inception of the Auqaf, income for the mosque used to come from rich donors. For the welfare of the mosque, INTACH took over the reins of renovation in 2012.

== See also ==
- Islam in India
- List of largest mosques
- List of mosques in India
