= Mohammad Farid Hamidi =

Attorney General of Afghanistan

څارنپوه Mohammad Farid Hamidi
- محمد فرید حمیدی

Attorney General Office of Afghanistan (AGO)

Attorney General of Afghanistan
- In office 2016–2021
- Appointed by: Ashraf Ghani
- President: Ashraf Ghani

لوی څارنوال

دادستان کل

Personal details
- Born: 1967 (age 58–59) Nangarhar, Afghanistan
- Education: Dual Bachelors (LLB in Criminal Law & BA in Law and Political Science) and Dual Masters (LLM in Criminal Law and MPP in Public Policy)
- Alma mater: Harvard University, Kabul University
- Profession: Attorney, Lawyer, Human rights activist
- Website: https://www.ago.gov

Mohammad Farid Hamidi (به فارسی و پشتو: څارنپوه محمدفرید حمیدی) (born 1967) is an Afghan lawyer and human rights activist, who served as the Attorney General of Afghanistan from 2016 till 2021.

== Early life and education ==
Mohammad Farid Hamidi was born in 1967 in Nangarhar province in eastern Afghanistan. He completed his primary education in a local school. Afterwards he was admitted to the National Police Academy of Afghanistan, where he received his bachelors in Criminal Law. He earned his second bachelors degree from the Faculty of Law and Political Science of Kabul University.

Hamidi obtained his first masters' degree with a concentration in Criminal Law from Islamic Azad University based in Kabul and his second Masters' from Harvard University in Public Administration.

== Career ==
=== Committee appointments ===
Hamidi was appointed as a member of the Election Committee of Emergency (Loya Jirga) and focal point for four provinces namely: Kandahar, Zabul, Helmand, and Uruzgan as per decree of the Head of interim administration in 2002. At the same time, he was appointed as the temporary secretary of the Emergency Loya Jirga. In 2002, he was appointed as a member of Independent Human Rights Commission of Afghanistan. Additionally, Hamidi was appointed as a member of Independent Election Complaint Commission as per decree of President of Afghanistan in 2005 and worked in this position for more than a year. In addition, Hamidi worked as a member of Reporting Committee of Government to International Conventions and Universal Periodic Review Committee as per a presidential decree.

He has also worked as advisor for the Ministry of Youth Affairs, and for six years as the Director of the Presidential Advisory Board to Appoint High Officials of the Government.

In 2014, he was appointed as Ambassador against torture in Afghanistan by the Asia-Pacific Assembly.

Hamidi has participated in numerous international and national conferences on Rule of Law, Elections, Judicial and Justice Reforms, and Good Governance, and has delivered speeches in this role.

=== Attorney General ===
Hamidi was appointed in 2016 as Attorney General of Afghanistan by President Ashraf Ghani. Hamidi served his country by supporting the rule of law, reformation, and human rights. He also focused on civic values and fighting against corruption, inequality, injustice, and violence against women and children in Afghanistan.

In March 2021, after serving in Afghanistan's justice sector for six years, Hamidi resigned his position as Attorney General of Afghanistan.
