= Mohammad Ishaq (cricketer, born 1963) =

Pakistani cricketer (born 1963)

Cricket information
- Batting: Right-handed
- Bowling: Right-arm medium

International information
- National side: United Arab Emirates (1994–1996)
- Source: CricInfo, 15 August 2022

Mohammad Ishaq (born 7 March 1963) is a Pakistani former cricketer who played first-class cricket for Lahore from 1984–85 to 1986–87 and later represented the United Arab Emirates national cricket team.

Ishaq was born in Lahore, Punjab, Pakistan. In his 13 first-class games he made 751 runs at an average of 30.04 and with a high score of 119. He later emigrated to the United Arab Emirates, for whom he played in the 1994 ICC Trophy and Pepsi Austral-Asia Cup and the 1996 World Cup. It was in the last two competitions that Mohammad Ishaq played his five One Day Internationals for UAE and scored 98 runs at an average of 24.50 his highest score was 51. He last played in
