= Mohibbul Hasan =

Indian historian

- Born: 1908; Mohammadpur
- Died: 21 April 1999 (aged 90–91)

Academic background
- Education: Lucknow Christian College; University of London

Mohibbul Hasan (1908–21 April 1999) was an Indian historian. He wrote books about history of pre-independence India.

== Education and career ==
After his early education at Lucknow, he went to London University for higher study. After his return, he started his teaching career at Punjab. After that he was appointed in Calcutta, Aligarh universities. From 1963 he became head of department of History in Jamia Millia Islamia and University of Kashmir.

== Works ==
In 1951, Hasan wrote his first book, History of Tipu Sultan. Later he wrote Kashmir under Sultans, Waqai-i-Manzili-Rum, Babur- founder of the Mughal Empire in India etc.
