= Clinical technologist =

Healthcare profession, primarily used in the UK (distinct from radiographer)

A clinical technologist, also known as a healthcare science practitioner, is a medical professional involved in the practical delivery of medical physics and clinical engineering services. In some locations there is considerable overlap in closely related terms, for example in many countries technologist and radiographer are synonyms, while in the United Kingdom they are considered separate professions. Clinical technologists can be found in nuclear medicine, radiotherapy, radiation protection, and rehabilitation engineering departments, and they are often described by their scope of practice (for example as a nuclear medicine technologist).

== Roles and responsibilities ==
Depending on local practices, in radiology and radiotherapy technologist may be a synonym for radiographer or a separate position. The International Atomic Energy Agency (IAEA) uses technologist primarily to refer to the staff involved in the practical clinical delivery of radiotherapy, radiology and nuclear medicine.

There is no single European Union definition or minimum training level for technologists, and the use of the term varies between member states. In radiotherapy, the European SocieTy for Radiotherapy and Oncology (ESTRO) previously referred to the staff carrying out the practical elements of treatment as Radiation Technologists (RTT), however they have since revised this to Radiation TherapisTs.

In the United Kingdom, clinical technologists and radiographers are separate professions with differing responsibilities. In X-ray radiography and radiotherapy, it is radiographers who will carry out the imaging or treatment, while technologists may be involved in equipment testing and radiation protection activities. In nuclear medicine however, those with technologist or radiographer training largely have the same responsibilities.

In the United States, and many other countries, technologist is the main term for the healthcare professionals performing diagnostic imaging (radiographers), as well as the staff involved in testing and quality control of X-ray equipment, with the latter specifically known as quality control technologists. Similarly in Canada medical radiation technologists (MRTs) carry out practical aspects of radiology and radiotherapy on patients.

=== Nuclear medicine ===
In nuclear medicine departments, clinical technologists are typically involved in the practical delivery of the service. They may be involved in preparing and injecting radiopharmaceuticals, talking to patients about their procedures, performing scans on gamma cameras and PET scanners, and quality control activities. Nuclear medicine technologists may perform a similar roles to, and in some departments work alongside, radiographers.

=== Radiation protection ===
Radiation protection technologists work alongside medical physicists and other professionals to provide advice, measurements and practical solutions for the protection of staff, patients and the general public from the harmful effects of ionising radiation.

=== Dialysis ===
In the UK a renal technologist (or dialysis technician) is responsible for technical and clinical aspects of the equipment involved in renal dialysis.

== Education and training ==
=== Africa ===
==== South Africa ====
In South Africa, clinical technologists are regulated by the Health Professions Council of South Africa. They work in one of seven categories: nephrology, neurophysiology, cardiology, critical care, pulmonology, cardiovascular perfusion, and reproductive biology. Training starts with a Health Sciences degree (BHSc) in Clinical Technology.

=== Europe ===
==== United Kingdom ====
There are several routes to clinical technologist careers. For medical physics roles, the Institute of Physics and Engineering in Medicine (IPEM) sets out a clinical technologist training scheme which lasts for two years and combines workplace-based clinical training with a post-graduate diploma in clinical technology. For renal technologists, the Association of Renal Technologists (ART) maintains a training scheme which includes practical training and university modules.

The practitioner training programme (PTP), overseen by the National School of Healthcare Science (NSHCS), is a three year course with clinical training and an undergraduate degree in healthcare science.

IPEM, ART, and the Institute of Healthcare Engineering and Estate Management (IHEEM) jointly operate the Register of Clinical Technologists. The register is accredited by the Professional Standards Authority.

IPEM and other professional bodies have campaigned for technologists to be included on a statutory register, for example with the Health and Care Professions Council.

=== North America ===
==== United States ====
In the United States a wide number of training schemes are available, ranging from one-year post-baccalaureate certificate programmes to four-year bachelor's degree programmes. Several methods of registration and certification exist.

== See also ==
- Medical physicist
- Medical technologist
- Cardiovascular technologist
