= Klaus Peter Jantke =

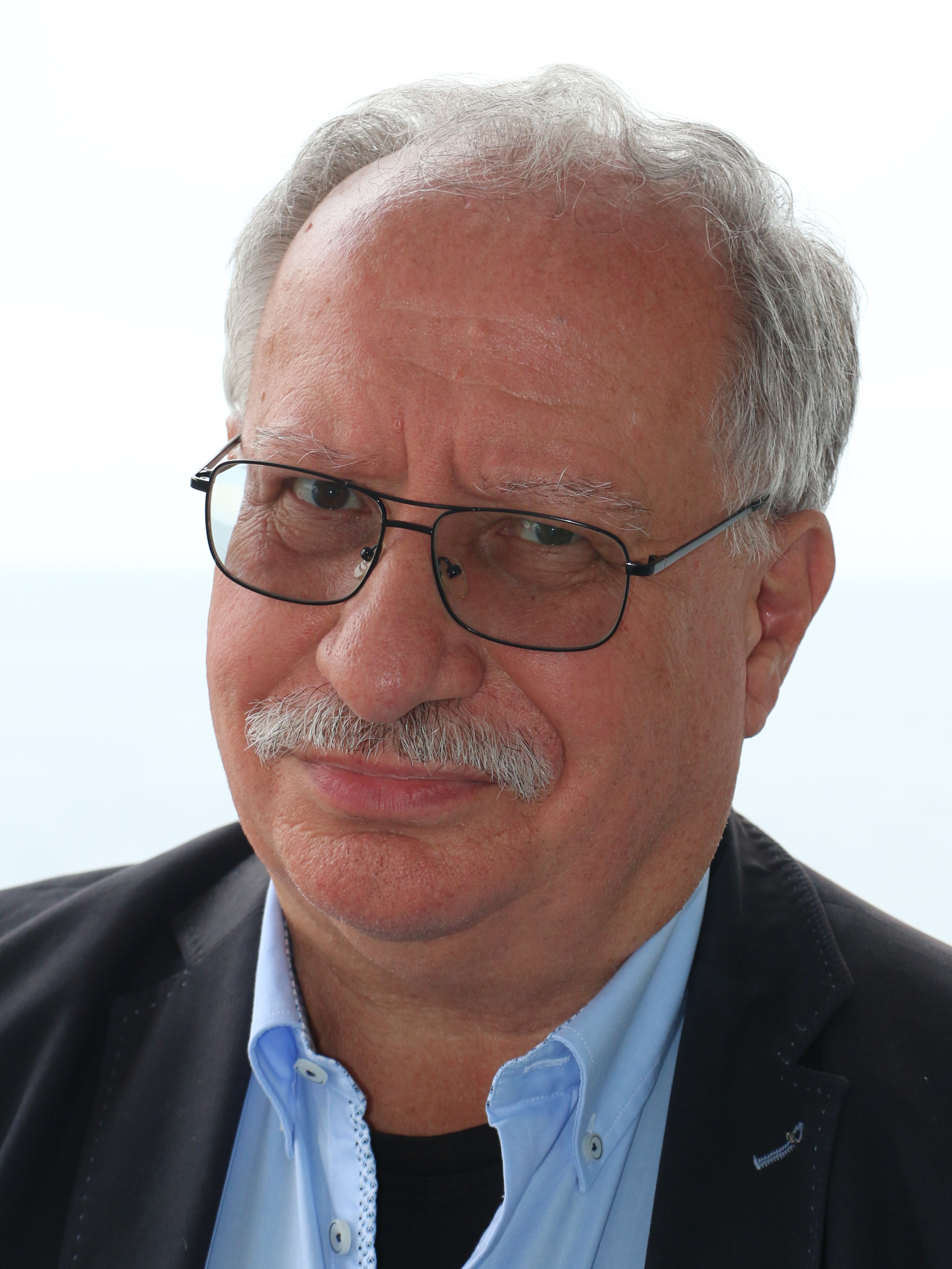
- Klaus Peter Jantke, 2019
- Born: 1951 (age 74–75); East Berlin, Germany
- Education: Humboldt University of Berlin
- Known for: Contributions to Gamification
- Children: 4
- Awards: Karl Weierstrass Prize, Humboldt Prize
- Scientific career
- Fields: Mathematics, Informatics, Artificial intelligence, Game studies, Gamification, PC game, Information security, Semantics (computer science), Rewriting, Educational technology, Machine learning
- Workplaces: Humboldt University of Berlin, Leipzig University of Applied Sciences, University of Stirling, International Computer Science Institute, Fujitsu Laboratories, Kuwait University, Hokkaido University, Chemnitz University of Technology, Brandenburg University of Technology Cottbus, Technische Universität Ilmenau, ADICOM, University of Erfurt
- Thesis: Leistungsfähigkeit und Kompliziertheit universeller Verfahren zur Erkennung allgemein-rekursiver Funktionen (Performance and complexity of universal methods for recognizing general-recursive functions) (1979)
- Doctoral advisor: Helmut Thiele

Klaus Peter Jantke (born 1951 in East Berlin) is a German mathematician, computer scientist, university teacher and academic researcher focusing on Artificial intelligence, Educational technology, Game studies and gamification.

== Education ==
Jantke earned his Abitur in 1970. From 1970 to 1975, he studied mathematics at Humboldt University in Berlin. He received his Diploma in the topic of mathematics and theoretical computer science. For his thesis he obtained in 1976 the Karl-Weierstraß-Prize.

In 1979 at the Humboldt University he received his PhD under Helmut Thiele for his thesis Leistungsfähigkeit und Kompliziertheit universeller Verfahren zur Erkennung allgemein-rekursiver Funktionen (Performance and complexity of universal methods for recognizing general-recursive functions). For this thesis he obtained the Humboldt-Prize of the Humboldt University.

== Career ==
Jantke's habilitation thesis in 1984 had the topic Ein allgemeiner Zugang zu Problemen der induktiven Inferenz (A general approach to problems of inductive inference).

From 1985 to 1987 Jantke worked as deputy director of the Data center of Humboldt University. Since 1985 he was a Docent. At the age of 35, he became Full Professor of theoretical computer science and basic research of artificial intelligence at the Technische Hochschule Leipzig in 1987.

Jantke taught at several national and international universities. He has been involved in projects of the Federal Ministry of Education and Research (Germany), the Federal Ministry for Economic Affairs and Energy, the Deutsche Forschungsgemeinschaft, the NATO, the German Research Centre for Artificial Intelligence, the Stifterverband für die Deutsche Wissenschaft.

At the beginning of the 21st century, Jantke established the competence center for e-learning at the German Research Center for Artificial Intelligence (DFKI), whose first director he became. In 2006 Jantke became Germany's first professor of computer games.

From 2005 to 2007, Jantke was Head of the Department of Multimedia Applications at the Institute for Media and Communication Science at the Technische Universität Ilmenau. There he built up teaching and research in the field of digital games. He introduced the Ilmenauer taxonomy for digital games with their own pattern terms and the research-specific games Jostle and Gorge. At the same time he taught on digital games at the Universities of Darmstadt, Leipzig and Ilmenau.

In 2008, Jantke established the Children's Media Department at the Fraunhofer Institute for Digital Media Technology. Jantke founded the first German Games Master Class in Leipzig in 2007 and became its director. Since 2008, it takes place in the summer and winter semesters in Erfurt.

At conferences in the US, Jantke gave keynote speeches on topics such as "Games That Do Not Exist" and "When the True Criminal Gets Virtual, the Virtual Crime Gets Real." In 2016, Jantke was a member of the Interdisciplinary Center of E-Humanities in History and Social Sciences (ICE) at the University of Erfurt.

From 2008 to 2016, Jantke was head of the Children's Media department at the Fraunhofer Institute for Digital Media Technology (IDMT). Since 2016, he has been Chief Scientific Officer at ADICOM.

For the period 2019-2021 Jantke has been appointed as a consultant to the Sino-German Industrial Design Center for the development of Sino-German economic cooperation.

== Editorships ==
- Jantke, Klaus P.; Kreuzberger, Gunther, eds. (2008-04-15), Knowledge media technologies: first International Core-to-Core Workshop, Diskussionsbeiträge / Institut für Medien- und Kommunikationswissenschaft, vol. 21, Ilmenau: Universitätsbibliothek Ilmenau, ISSN 1617-9048
- Jantke, Klaus P.; Lunzer, Aran; Spyratos, Nicolas; Tanaka, Yuzuru, eds. (May 2005), Federation Over the Web, Lecture Notes in Artificial Intelligence, vol. 3847, Dagstuhl Castle, Germany: Springer, doi:10.1007/11605126, ISBN 978-3-540-31018-1, ISSN 0302-9743
- Arikawa, Setsuo; Jantke, Klaus P., eds. (Oct 1994), Algorithmic Learning Theory, Lecture Notes in Computer Science, vol. 872, Reinhardsbrunn Castle, Germany: Springer, doi:10.1007/3-540-58520-6, ISBN 3-540-58520-6, ISSN 0302-9743, S2CID 554068
- Dix, Jürgen; Schmitt, Peter H.; Jantke, Klaus P., eds. (Dec 1990), Nonmonotonic and Inductive Logic, Lecture Notes in Computer Science, vol. 543, Karlsruhe, Germany: Springer, doi:10.1007/BFb0023313, ISBN 978-3-540-54564-4, ISSN 0302-9743, S2CID 5167610
- Jantke, Klaus P., ed. (Oct 1986), Analogical and Inductive Inference, Lecture Notes in Computer Science, vol. 265, Wendisch-Rietz, GDR: Springer, doi:10.1007/3-540-18081-8, ISBN 978-3-540-18081-4, ISSN 0302-9743, S2CID 43385599

== Filmography ==
- Achtung, Computer! Macht uns das Internet dumm? (2012)
- titel, thesen, temperamente, 2012
