= Rehabilitation engineering =

Technological solutions to problems confronted by individuals with disabilities

Rehabilitation engineering is the systematic application of engineering sciences to design, develop, adapt, test, evaluate, apply, and distribute technological solutions to problems confronted by individuals with disabilities. These individuals may have experienced a spinal cord injury, brain trauma, or any other debilitating injury or disease (such as multiple sclerosis, Parkinson's, West Nile, ALS, etc.). Functional areas addressed through rehabilitation engineering may include mobility, communications, hearing, vision, and cognition, and activities associated with employment, independent living, education, and integration into the community.

Rehabilitation Engineering and Assistive Technology Society of North America, the association and certifying organization of professionals within the field of Rehabilitation Engineering and Assistive Technology in North America, defines the role of a Rehabilitation Engineer as well as the role of a Rehabilitation Technician, Assistive Technologist, and Rehabiltiation Technologist (not all the same) in the 2017 approved White Paper available online on their website.

== Qualifications ==
While some rehabilitation engineers have master's degrees in rehabilitation engineering, usually a subspecialty of Biomedical engineering, most rehabilitation engineers have undergraduate or graduate degrees in biomedical engineering, mechanical engineering, or electrical engineering. A Portuguese university provides an undergraduate degree and a master's degree in Rehabilitation Engineering and Accessibility.

In the UK, there are 3 recognised training routes into Rehabilitation Engineering:

- AHCS Practitioner Training Programme (PTP) higher/degree apprenticeship in Healthcare Science Practitioner (Clinical Engineering) at UWE Bristol or Healthcare Science (Rehabilitation Engineering) at Swansea University leading to RCT or AHCS registration as a Clinical Technologist/Healthcare Science Practitioner.
- The Scientist Training Programme (STP) leading to HCPC registration as a Clinical Scientist through the National School of Healthcare Science with applications open during January each year.
- Training centres around the UK are accredited to provide the IPEM Clinical Technologist Training Scheme leading to RCT registration as a Clinical Technologist.

In the UK, there are 3 professional registration bodies for Rehabilitation Engineers:

- The Register of Clinical Technologists (RCT) and administered through the Institute of Physics and Engineering in Medicine (IPEM).
- The Healthcare Science Practitioner Register through the Academy for Healthcare Science (AHCS)
- The Health & Care Professions Council (HCPC) for IPEM, AHCS and ACS.

== Professional, Scientific and Technical Associations ==
Many of the Rehabilitation Engineering professionals join multidisciplinary scientific and technical associations with a common interest in the field of Assistive Technology and Accessibility. Examples are RESNA - Rehabilitation Engineering and Assistive Technology Society of North America, RESJA - Rehabilitation Engineering Society of JAPAN, AAATE - Association for the Advancement of Assistive Technology in Europe, ARATA – Australian Rehabilitation & Assistive Technology Association, AITADIS - Asociación Iberoamericana de Tecnologías de Apoyo a la Discapacidad and SUPERA – Portuguese Society of Rehabilitation Engineering, Assistive Technologies and Accessibility.

Other organizations, like RESMAG and the National Committee on Rehabilitation Engineering of Engineers Australia are also committed to developing and providing resources that support the practice of rehabilitation engineers.

The Rehabilitation Engineering and Assistive Technology Society of North America (RESNA), whose mission is to "improve the potential of people with disabilities to achieve their goals through the use of technology", is one of the main professional societies for rehabilitation engineers. RESNA's annual conference is held in the Washington, D.C., area in July.

UK Professional Bodies for Clinical Scientists in Rehabilitation Engineering:

- Association of Clinical Scientists (ACS)
- Institute of Physics and Engineering in Medicine (IPEM)
- Academy for Healthcare Science (AHCS)

== Assistive Technology devices ==
The rehabilitation process for people with disabilities often entails mechanical design of assistive devices such as Walking aids intended to promote inclusion of their users into the mainstream of society, commerce, and recreation. Device development can range from purely mechanical to mechatronics and software.

Within the National Health Service of the United Kingdom Rehabilitation Engineers are commonly involved with assessment and provision of wheelchairs and seating to promote good posture and independent mobility. This includes electrically powered wheelchairs, active user (lightweight) manual wheelchairs, and in more advanced clinics this may include assessments for specialist wheelchair control systems and/or bespoke seating solutions.

The A-SET Mind Controlled Wheelchair has been invented by Diwakar Vaish, the head of Robotics and Research at A-SET Training and Research Institutes, India. It is of advantage to patients with locked-in syndrome. It uses neural signals to command the wheelchair. This is the world's first in production neurally controlled wheelchair.

Many of these devices are not designed to be multi-functional or to be easy to use.

== Ongoing research ==
Rehabilitation Engineering Research Centers conduct research in the rehabilitation engineering, each focusing on one general area or aspect of disability. For example, the Smith-Kettlewell Eye Research Institute conducts research for the blind and visually impaired. Many of the Veterans Administration Rehabilitation Research & Development Centers conduct rehabilitation engineering research.

== See also ==
- Rehabilitation Engineering and Assistive Technology Society of North America
- Rehabilitation Act of 1973
- Disability Discrimination Act 1995
- Medical engineering
- Prosthetics
- Mind Controlled Wheelchair
