= Assistive technology service provider =

Assistive technology service providers help individuals with disabilities acquire and use appropriate Assistive Technology (AT) to help them participate in activities of daily living, employment and education.

There are few pre-service programs that offer degrees or certificates explicitly in assistive technology service provision. In the United States, only three institutions have such accredited programs: University of Illinois Chicago, University of Pittsburgh, and University of Wisconsin-Milwaukee. The programs at University of Illinois Chicago and University of Wisconsin-Milwaukee are graduate certificates; the University of Pittsburgh's is a master's degree. Rather than consisting entirely of individuals with explicit AT education, the field of AT service provision consists of an interdisciplinary group of rehabilitation engineers, occupational therapists, physical therapists, speech-language pathologists, suppliers, educators and other professionals who specialize in AT. AT professionals typically have a degree in one of these other fields, but will have additional training in assistive technology.

Professional organizations for AT service providers include: the Rehabilitation Engineering and Assistive Technology Society of North America (RESNA), AAATE (Association for the Advancement of Assistive Technology in Europe (AAATE), ARATA (Australian Rehabilitation and Assistive Technology Association (ARATA), and Rehabilitation Engineering Society of Japan (RESJA).

Since the profession includes people with such varied backgrounds, beginning in 1995, RESNA developed several certification programs for recognizing a demonstrated level of professional competence in the service provision of assistive technology:

- Assistive Technology Professional (ATP) - A service provider who analyzes the needs of consumers with disabilities, assists in selection of appropriate assistive technology for the consumer's needs, and provides training in the use of the selected device(s).
- Seating and Mobility Specialist (SMS) - An ATP who specializes in the comprehensive seating, positioning, and mobility needs of consumers with disabilities.
- Rehabilitation Engineering Technologist (RET) - A person who applies engineering principles to the design, modification, customization and/or fabrication of assistive technology for persons with disabilities. An individual must obtain the ATP credential prior obtaining the RET credential.

Credentialed service providers must meet specific education and professional experience levels, and must demonstrate knowledge of assistive technology, as shown by passing a credentialing exam. According to RESNA, several thousand individuals hold these credentials.

Assistive technology service providers may specialize in several areas of assistive technology, including job accommodations, computer accessibility, vehicle modifications, architectural modifications and home modifications, augmentative and alternative communication, environmental controls, positioning devices, seating and mobility, sensory aids, and learning accommodations. They may be affiliated with hospitals, state vocational rehabilitation programs, schools, assistive technology companies, or disability organizations.

Assistive technologies are often used for people who have any type of speech, hearing, or visual impairment. In fact, assistive technologies are often used for people with any type of impairment that affects their everyday life whether it is permanent or temporary. There are a variety of types of assistive technologies which include: wheelchairs, canes, hearing aids, prosthetic devices, orthotic devices, cognitive devices, adaptive switches, closed captioning, and many more different types of assistive technologies. What many people don't know is how wide of a range assistive technologies provide to us. For example, one would never assume that closed captioning programs are a type of assistive technology. But at the same time assistive technology can also be considered something more in depth like the various types of prosthetic devices used to replace body parts.

== History within education ==
According to Ben Satterfield of Georgia Institute of Technology, (AT) or assistive technology refers to “any item, piece of equipment, or product system, whether acquired commercially off the shelf, modified, or customized, that is used to increase, maintain, or improve functional capabilities of children with disabilities.” The first initial use of AT was to help in the education field, it developed in the mid-1990s. The purpose of assistive technology is to enrich learning and academic performance within the classroom.

== The process ==
The devices that are used to help those with disabilities are usually paid for by a third party, for example, insurance. To acquire an assistive technology device, you need to seek help from a trained individual in the assistive technology field of services. They will perform evaluations on the individual to see what they require help in, whether that be physical, cognitive or sensory functions. After the device is assigned, medical equipment companies, rehabilitation facilities or volunteer organizations all customize, maintain and repair it. There is so many factors that go into the piece of technology.

== Assistive Technology Professional (ATP) certification ==
To earn the Assistive Technology Professional (ATP) Certification an individual must display extensive knowledge of the needs of those with disabilities, be able to aid them in the proper selection of assistive technology to suit their needs, and provide adequate training on the utilization of said equipment.

=== Exam eligibility ===
As of April 2012, according to RESNA, "To take the exam for ATP certification, candidates MUST meet both the educational and work experience requirements for ONE of the combinations listed below. "

'Degree'	'AT Training & Education'	'Work Experience'
Master's Degree or Higher in Special Education		1000 hours in 6 years
Master's Degree or Higher in Rehab Science		1000 hours in 6 years
Bachelor's Degree in Special Education		1500 hours in 6 years
Bachelor's Degree in Rehab Science		1500 hours in 6 years
Bachelor's Degree in Non-Rehab Science	10 hours	2000 hours in 6 years
Associate Degree Rehab Science		3000 hours in 6 years
Associate Degree Non-Rehab Science	20 hours	4000 hours in 6 years
HS diploma or GED	30 hours	6000 hours in 10 years

=== ATP exam outline ===
Once the exam is scheduled and ready to be taken, there are five different areas to be judged on: assessment of need, development of intervention strategies, implementation of intervention strategies, evaluation of intervention, and professional conduct.

==== I. Assessment of Need (30% of final exam grade) ====
For the assessment of need portion of the exam an individual should be prepared to: evaluate the consumer and determine their needs, analyze relevant past documents, plan the assessment to fit the consumer's needs, take environmental factors into account, work jointly with team members, ensure the technology suits the consumer's needs and abilities, suggest outlets for further support, make the client's goals a priority, and make the outcome of the assessment clear to the consumer.

==== II. Development of Intervention Strategies- Action Plan (27% of exam) ====
For the action plan portion of the exam an individual should be prepared to: explain potential options, choose equipment fitting the consumer's needs/goals/capabilities, evaluate the differences between the equipment being considered and past equipment used, train consumers on use of selected equipment, monitor progress, make note of recommendations, and come to a final solution.

==== III. Implementation of Intervention Strategies- Once Funded (25% of exam) ====
For the implementation of strategies portion of the exam an individual should be prepared to: discuss the plan, monitor the order process, inspect equipment, adjust equipment to suit the consumer's needs, inform consumer on necessary maintenance, assess consumer's capability to use equipment after demonstrations, ensure the consumer has continued training, document the process, and ensure the consumer understands their rights and responsibilities.

==== IV. Evaluation of Intervention- Follow-Up (15% of exam) ====
For the follow-up portion of the exam an individual should be prepared to: identify the results, begin the restoration process if necessary, make possible strategy changes, and continue to work toward the consumer's goals.

==== V. Professional Conduct (3% of exam) ====
Throughout the exam an individual will also be evaluated to ensure they are following to code of ethics and actively participating in opportunities for advancement in the assistive technology field.

=== Future training ===
After certification, the learning process is not over. Assistive technology is a constantly changing field and survey participants collectively agreed that the most important training needs are following the newest advancements in technology; comprehend funding for services; and communicating with consumer's/their families, along with other professionals.
