= HSST =

HSST may refer to:

- High Speed Surface Transport
- High stand systems tract, a system tract in sequence stratigraphy
- Springfield High School of Science and Technology
- Higher Specialist Scientific Training, see Modernising Scientific Careers
- HQMC SDA Selection Team United States Marine Corps
