= Chief scientific officer =

Head of scientific research operations

A chief scientific officer (CSO) is a position at the head of scientific research operations at organizations or companies performing significant scientific research projects.

== Description ==
A CSO is typically responsible for envisioning and developing research capabilities (human, methodological, and technological) for developing evidence of the validity and utility of research products, and for communicating with the scientific and customer communities concerning capabilities and scientific product offerings.

In some organizations, the same person may hold this title along with that of chief technology officer (CTO). Alternatively, a company could have one or the other, or both occupied by separate people. Often, CSOs exist in heavily research-oriented companies; while CTOs exist in product development focused companies. The typical category of research and development that exists in many science and technology companies can be led by either post, depending upon which area is the organization's primary focus.

A CSO almost always has a pure science background and an advanced degree, whereas a CTO often has a background in engineering or business development.

Some academic research organizations, such as the Fox Chase Cancer Center, Dana–Farber Cancer Institute, and the San Diego Supercomputer Center have adopted a similar title of CSO. Typically, their role is to evaluate and set scientific priorities and coordinate the administrative structure that supports scientists. A CSO commonly has a scientific or academic background, yet they may or may not be practicing scientists or academics.

== England ==
In the National Health Service, the CSO is the head of profession for the 53,000 healthcare scientists working in the organization and its associated bodies. The CSO is one of six NHS professional officers (including the chief medical officer and the chief nursing officer) who are employed within NHS England. These roles lead their own professional groups as well as providing expert knowledge about their specific disciplines to the NHS and wider health and care system.

The CSO provides professional leadership and expert clinical advice across the health system, as well as working alongside senior clinical leaders within NHS England and the broader commissioning system. The CSO is also responsible for delivering the government's strategy for a modernised healthcare science workforce, Modernising Scientific Careers.

Professor Dame Sue Hill has been the CSO since October 2002 first within the department of health and subsequently NHS England. The role was strengthened in March 2023 with the appointment of a deputy CSO, Dr.Joel.

== Canada ==
The Public Health Agency of Canada is home to a CSO. As of May 2020, the PHAC CSO was named Pascal Michel.

The Canadian Food Inspection Agency is home to a Chief Science Operating Officer.

== See also ==
- C-suite
- Chief experimental officer (CEO)
- Chief innovation officer (CINO)
- Chief technology officer (CTO)
