= RESNA =

RESNA or Resna may refer to:

- Resen, North Macedonia, the Greek name for Resen, Macedonia
- Rehabilitation Engineering and Assistive Technology Society of North America, known as RESNA
