= Health Professions Council of South Africa =

Regulator of health and care professions

- Abbreviation: HPCSA
- Formation: 1974; 52 years ago
- Type: Statutory body
- Headquarters: Pretoria
- Region served: South Africa
- Website: www.hpcsa.co.za

The Health Professions Council of South Africa (HPCSA) is the statutory body regulating specific healthcare professions within South Africa. The council oversees healthcare practice, establishes standards for education and training, and upholds ethical professional standards as prescribed by the Health Professions Act No. 56 of 1974.

== History ==
The Health Professions Council of South Africa was established in 1974 under the Health Professions Act No. 56 of 1974. Regulation of medicine and allied professions in South Africa began in the 19th century, with the establishment of the Colonial Medical Council in the Cape Province in 1891. The Natal Medical Council was then established in 1896, followed by the Medical and Pharmacy Council of the Orange River Colony in 1904 and the Transvaal Medical Council in 1905.

Following the formation of the Union of South Africa, the South African Medical and Dental Council (SAMDC) was formed in accordance with Act 13 of 1928 to fulfil the functions of the former provincial councils. Act 56 of 1974 replaced Act 13 of 1928, and the HPCSA as it exists currently was formed. The SAMDC continues as a separate legal entity.

== Professions regulated by the HPCSA ==
The HPCSA regulates 12 categories of healthcare professionals. They are:

Category	Protected Titles	Number of Registrants
Dental Assisting, Dental Therapy & Oral Hygiene	Oral Hygienist Dental Assistant Dental Therapist	9 454
Dietetics and Nutrition	Dietitian Student Dietitian Supplementary Dietitian Nutritionist Student nutritionist Supplementary Nutritionist	5 542
Emergency Care	Basic Ambulance Assistant Ambulance Emergency Assistant Operational Emergency Care Orderly Emergency Care Assistant Paramedic Emergency Care Technician Emergency Care Practitioner	67 800
Environmental Health	Environmental Health Practitioner Student Environmental Health Practitioner Food Inspector Environmental Health Assistant	5 903
Medical and Dental (and medical science)	Medical Practitioner Clinical Associate Anesthetist's Assistant Health Assistant Dentist Genetic Counsellor Medical Physicist Medical Biological Scientist Biomedical Engineer (register closed for new registrations) Clinical Biochemist (register closed for new registrations)	76 445
Medical Technology	Medical Laboratory Scientist Intern Medical Laboratory Scientist Student Medical Laboratory Scientist Medical Technologist Intern Medical Technologist Student Medical Technologist Medical Technician Student Medical Technician Supplementary Medical Technician Laboratory Assistant Student Laboratory Assistant Supplementary Laboratory Assistant	20 536
Occupational Therapy, Medical Orthotics, Prosthetics & Arts Therapy	Occupational Therapist Supplementary Occupational Therapist Occupational Therapy Technician Occupational Therapy Assistant Medical Orthotics and Prosthetics Supplementary Medical Orthotics and Prosthetics Orthopaedic Footwear Technician Orthopaedic Technical Assistant Assistant Medical Orthotics and Prosthetics & Leatherworks Arts Therapist: Drama, Music, Art & Movement	9 324
Optometry & Dispensing Opticians	Dispensing Optician Student Dispensing Optician Supplementary Optical Dispenser Student Supplementary Optical Dispenser Supplementary Optometrist Optometrist Student Optometrist Orthoptist	5 331
Physiotherapy, Podiatry and Biokinetics	Physiotherapist Student Physiotherapist Physiotherapy Technician Physiotherapy Assistants Student Physiotherapy Assistant Remedial Gymnasts Supplementary Biokineticist Supplementary Podiatrist Supplementary Physiotherapist Masseur Podiatrist Biokineticist Biokineticist Intern Student Biokineticist Student Podiatrist	14 753
Psychology	Psychologist Intern Psychologist Student Psychologist Registered Counsellor Psychometrist Student Psychometrist Psychotechnician Student Registered Counsellor	19 391
Radiography & Clinical Technology	Student Radiographer Radiographer Supplementary Diagnostic Radiographer Clinical technologist Encephalographic Technician	12 893
Speech Language and Hearing Professions	Speech Therapist Speech Therapist & Audiologist Audiologist Hearing Aid Acoustician Audiometrician Supplementary Audiologist Supplementary Hearing Aid Acoustician Supplementary Speech Therapy and Audiology Speech Hearing and Correctionist Community Speech and Hearing Worker Speech Therapy Assistant Speech and Hearing Assistant	5 281

All of these professions have at least one professional title that is protected by law, including those shown above. Anyone using these titles must be registered with the HPCSA. It is a criminal offence for someone to claim that they are registered with the HPCSA when they are not or to use a protected title that they are not entitled to use.
