= Fockeberg =

Non-natural hill in Leipzig, Germany

Coordinates: 51°19′03″N 12°21′44″E

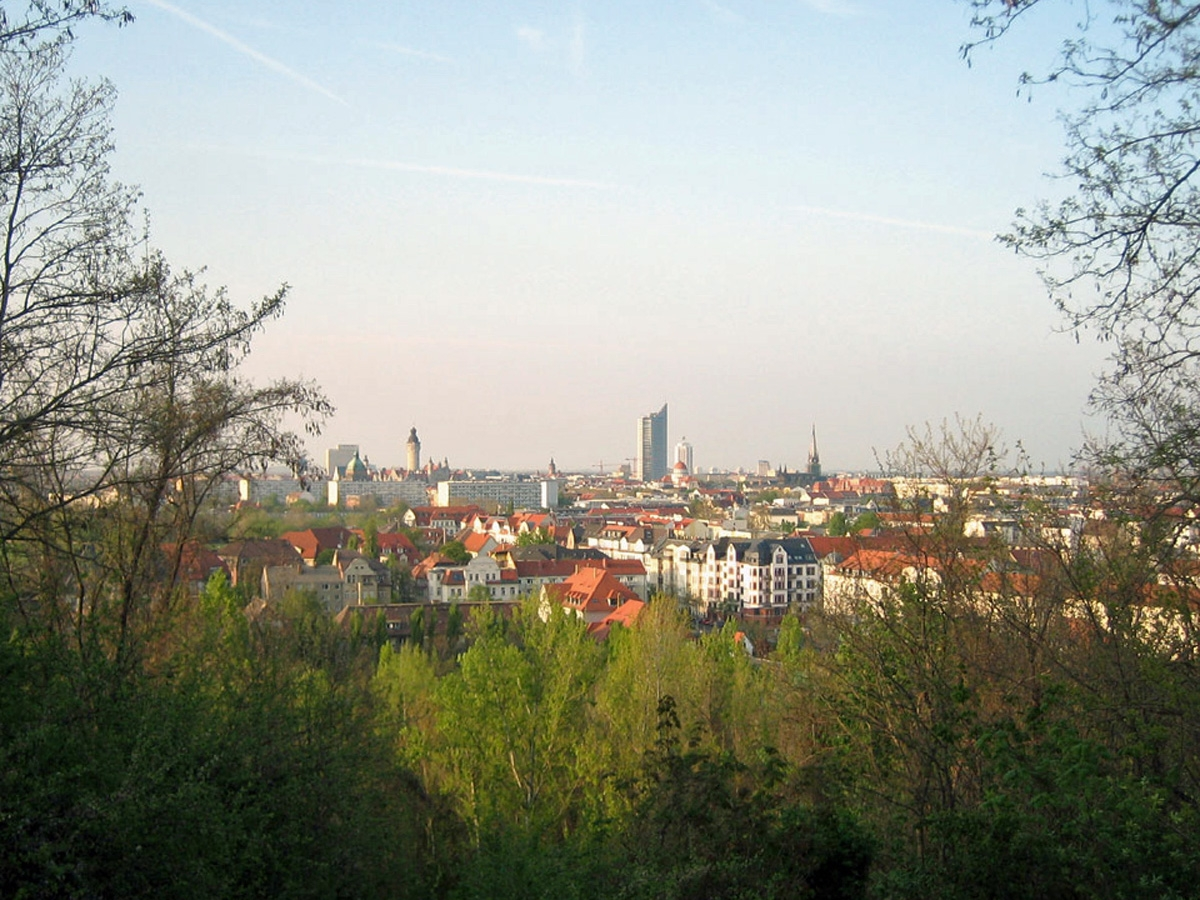
- Leipzig city centre seen from Fockeberg

Geography
- Location: Leipzig, Saxony, Germany

Fockeberg is a Schuttberg in the southern part of Leipzig, Saxony, southeastern Germany, and is actually a pile of rubble left over from the Bombing of Leipzig in World War II. Today it is a wooded hill which overlooks the Südvorstadt and the city center of Leipzig from the height of 40 metres (131 ft) on one side and the Leipzig Riverside Forest on the other.

At 155 metres (509 ft) above sea level, it is one of the highest peaks in Leipzig, nevertheless below the discharges of Leipzig-Seehausen (178 metres (584 ft)) or Leipzig-Liebertwolkwitz (177 metres (581 ft)) and the natural hills of Galgenberg (163 metres (535 ft)) at the border with Markkleeberg and Monarchenhügel 159 metres (522 ft) in Leipzig-Liebertwolkwitz.

== Odonymy ==
It is located in the Südvorstadt neighbourhood southwest of the intersection of Hardenbergstrasse and Fockestrasse, which gave it its name. The street itself was named in 1908 in honor of the Lipsian merchant August Adolf Focke (1817–1885), known for having donated part of his fortune for a municipal clinic and a poorhouse.

== History ==
At the end of World War II, a railway network began to be built in Leipzig to transport debris and rubble out of the city and store it in different locations. This was a natural elevation of 40 metres (131 ft) on a wooded field, the Bauernwiese (Litt.: farmers' meadow) on the edge of the Leipzig Riverside Forest. This site offered the advantage of being close to the southeastern suburbs of the city center (current Südvorstadt neighbourhood) which had suffered heavy damage during the bombings. The first rubble was stored there on 3 November 1947. They were transported by the railways called Südbahn and Zentrumsbahn. After that in November 1952, all the war debris depots were closed, the Fockeberg is the only one to still be in service for several years. The earth and rubble from Fockeberg were also reused, as during the construction of the Central Stadium in 1956.

At the beginning of the 1980s, the hill was developed to accommodate walkers. Several benches are installed at its summit as well as 15 wooden sculptures, trees are planted on its slope and the road (approximately 850 metres (2,789 ft) long) to access it is paved. In 1994, a pergola was built at the entrance with sculptures by Jürgen and Rainer Streege. The Fockeberg is now a very popular place for Lipsians, particularly during New Year's Eve.

== Events ==
Many sporting events take place at Fockeberg.

Every year, the culture center named naTo in the Karl-Liebknecht-Strasse organizes a gravity racers' race down the Fockeberg road, called Prix de tacot.

Since 1991, a 12 kilometres (7 mi) run with six laps and a total elevation gain of 270 metres (886 ft)) and a 6 kilometres (4 mi) run with 3 laps and 135 metres (443 ft) elevation gain has been organized twice a year, on the first Saturday in March and November.

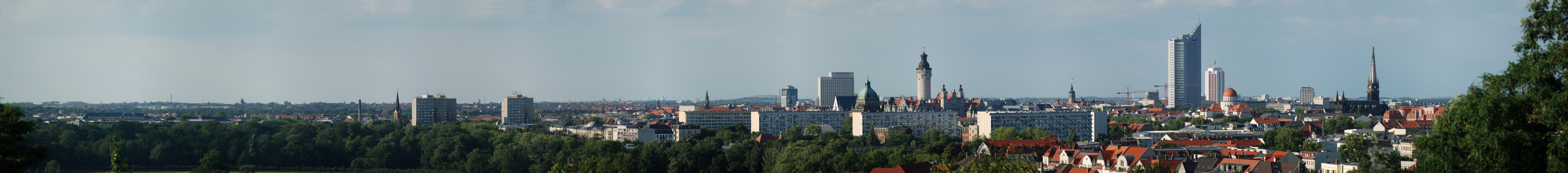
View from Fockeberg to Leipzig city center

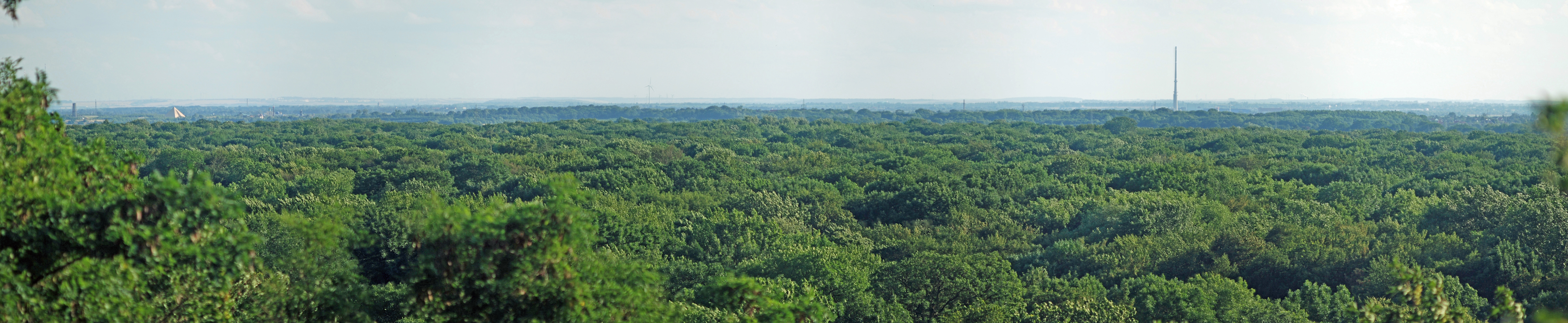
View from Fockeberg to the Leipzig Riverside Forest
