= Karl-Liebknecht-Straße (Leipzig) =

Street in Leipzig, Germany

Coordinates: 51.320833°N 12.373611°E

Karl-Liebknecht-Strasse
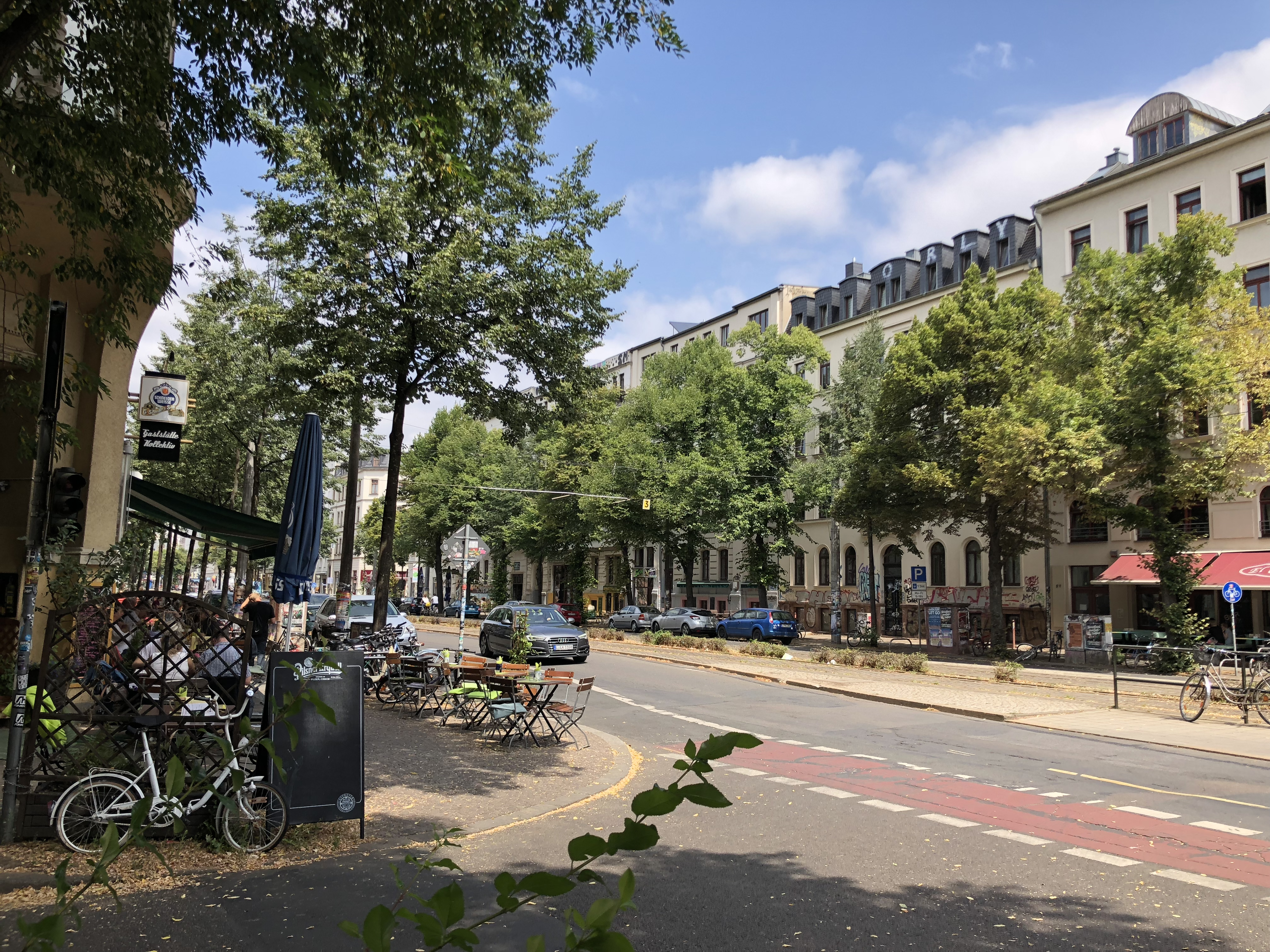
- Interactive map of Karl-Liebknecht-Strasse
- Former names: Südstrasse, Adolf-Hitler-Strasse, Zeitzer Strasse (part of it)
- Length: 2,428 m (7,966 ft)
- Location: Südvorstadt, Connewitz, Leipzig, Germany
- Postal code: 04107, 04275, 04277
- Nearest metro station: Tram stops
- North: Petersteinweg
- South: Connewitzer Kreuz

Construction
- Completion: 1877

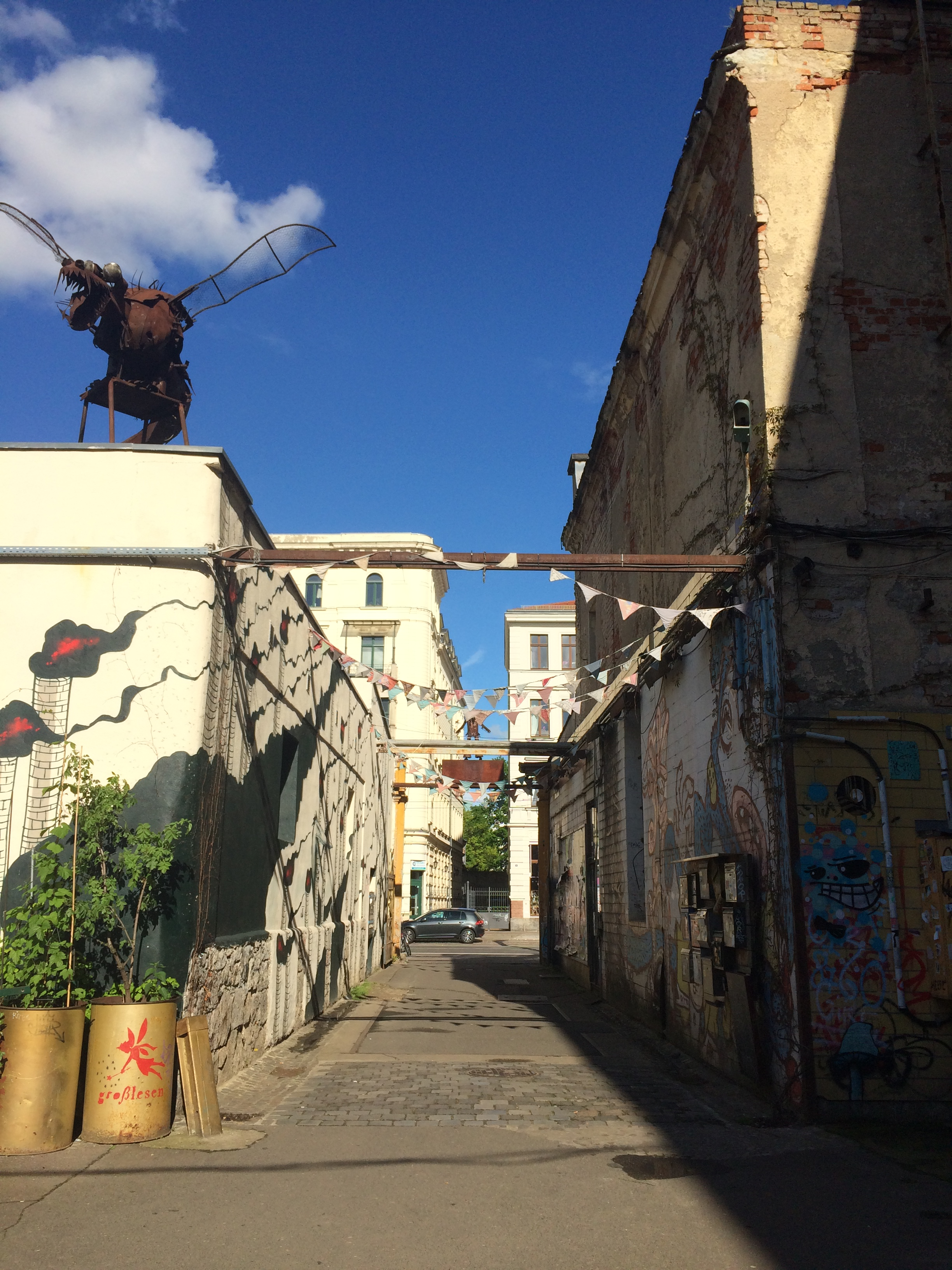
Entrance to the dead end street leading to the thrift store: Mrs Hippie. This place also houses a stage for the KarLi Beben, an annual festival featuring musicians, stands, activities and entertainment.

The Karl-Liebknecht-Strasse is a street in Leipzig, Saxony, Germany. It connects the locality (Ortsteil) Zentrum-Süd in the borough Leipzig-Mitte to the locality of Connewitz in the borough of Leipzig-Süd in a nearly straight line of 2.5 km (1.6 mi). Crossing the locality Südvorstadt including its central square Südplatz, Karl-Liebknecht-Strasse is one of the most popular streets in Leipzig for its university, its shops, its bars and restaurants and more generally for its daytime and nighttime activities.

== Odonymy ==
From 1874 to 1933, the street was simply called Südstrasse ("southern street"). On 24 May 1933, it was renamed Adolf-Hitler-Strasse after Adolf Hitler's rise to power like many other roads in Germany. On 18 May 1945, under American occupation, the street was given back its original name, Südstrasse. On 1 August 1945, under Soviet occupation, it was renamed this time by Karl-Liebknecht-Strasse in honor of the Leipzigian co-founder of the Communist Party of Germany Karl Liebknecht (1871-1919), an odonym that was not challenged at the German reunification. Karl Liebknecht was born in an adjacent street, Braustrasse 15. Later, he lived Südplatz 11, which is today Karl-Liebknecht-Strasse 69.

Due to the successive renamings in the post-war period, some people have made a playful potpourri of it: Adolf-Südknecht-Strasse. Today, Lipsians familiarly call the street Karli or Südmeile.

== History ==
The street was created during the real estate boom at the end of the 19th century. In place of this street there used to be a path that connected the city center with the old Connewitz. This path ran along today's Kochstrasse.

The northern section of the street, starting from Südplatz, already existed in the Middle Ages. It formed part of the Via Imperii. Until the middle of the 19th century, this section was called Connewitzer Chaussee and from 1839 Zeitzer Strasse.

When Leipzig was fortified by ramparts, the fortifications cut off the northern end of the street, at the height of today's Riemannstrasse. To enter the city walls, one had to pass through the rampart gate called outer Peter gate or Zeitzertor, the "Zeitz Gate" on the road to Zeitz, a town in Saxony-Anhalt located about 50 km (31.1 mi) south of Leipzig.

Opposite Heinrich-Schütz-Platz, a square which had been converted into a green space in 1890 by Leipzig's municipal gardener Otto Wittenberg (1834-1918), stood St. Andrew's Church, which was damaged during the Second World War and razed in 1958.

== The Karli Beben ==
Twice a year, the street is transformed and hosts a day and night festival under the motto: Die Karli lebt, die Karli bebt! ("The Karli lives, the Karli trembles"). While this place is already very popular throughout the year with a majority of students and tourists for its atmosphere, its many trendy bars and restaurants as well as its aesthetics, the Karli Beben attracts and brings together a large number of locals.

Many stands such as food trucks are set up, a flea market runs down the street. During the day, there are many events that follow one another, music fills the streets, plays are performed. Once night falls, the atmosphere becomes more festive; the stands then give way to stages, occupied by various music groups.

== Urban planning ==
The house numbering follows the Napoleonic sequential logic. Odd numbers are on the east side and even numbers on the west side.

The dominant architectural styles on the street are neoclassicism, historicism, art nouveau or Heimatschutz Architecture as well as some examples of expressionist architecture and art deco. Some buildings destroyed during the war were rebuilt during the GDR. The buildings on Karl-Liebknecht-Strasse have been almost completely rehabilitated. At some buildings the stucco and decorations were removed during the GDR to make the facades smooth, neutral and unadorned.

List of important cross streets (from north to south):

Zentrum-Süd
- Riemannstrasse
- Hohe Strasse
- Paul-Gruner-Strasse
- Braustr./Shakespearestrae
- Körnerstraße
Süd-Vorstadt
- Schenkendorffstrasse
- Arndtstrasse
- Alfred-Kästner-Strasse
- Kurt-Eisner-Strasse
- Scharnhorststrasse
- Hardenbergstrasse
- Steinstrasse
- Fichtestrasse
- Kantstrasse
- Richard-Lehmann-Strasse
Connewitz
- Eichendorffstrasse
- Gustav-Freytag-Strasse
- Scheffelsstrasse
- Arno-Nitzsche-Strasse

== Transports ==
Karl-Liebknecht-Strasse is a dual carriageway with a dual carriageway and cycle lane. In the middle of the roadway are the tram tracks for lines 10 and 11 of the Leipzig tram, as well as line 9 between Richard-Lehmann-Strasse and Connewitzer Kreuz. The names of the tram stops are »Hohe Straße, LVB«, »Südplatz«, »Karl-Liebknecht-/Kurt-Eisner-Straße«, »Karl-Liebknecht-/Richard-Lehmann-Straße« and »Connewitz, Kreuz«.

== Notable buildings ==
No. 30/32: Volkshaus

Bourse du Travail, which represents the historical seat of the Lipsian trade unionism. Today, it is still the seat of the German Trade Union Confederation and of ver.di, the unified service union. The inner courtyard of the Volkshaus houses a granite stele in honor of Heinrich Heine.

No. 46: naTo

Cinema and cultural center. A wooden pavilion was first built here in 1949. It was burned down during the East German uprising of 1953 and then rebuilt in solid form to become the headquarters of the National Front of the German Democratic Republic. Since 1982 it has been used as a cinema, theater, concert hall and conference hall. This is where the band Rammstein gave their first public concert on 14 April 1994. The naTo is the headquarters of the association Kultur- und Kommunikationszentrum naTo eV which, in addition to managing the center, organizes festive events in Leipzig during the summer, such as the prix de tacot (a gravity racers' race organized on the Fockeberg) or the regattas de baquet (bathtub race on the lake of the Monument to the Battle of the Nations).

No. 145:

The seat of the Leipzig University of Applied Sciences (HTWK) designed by the architect Albert Geutebrück.

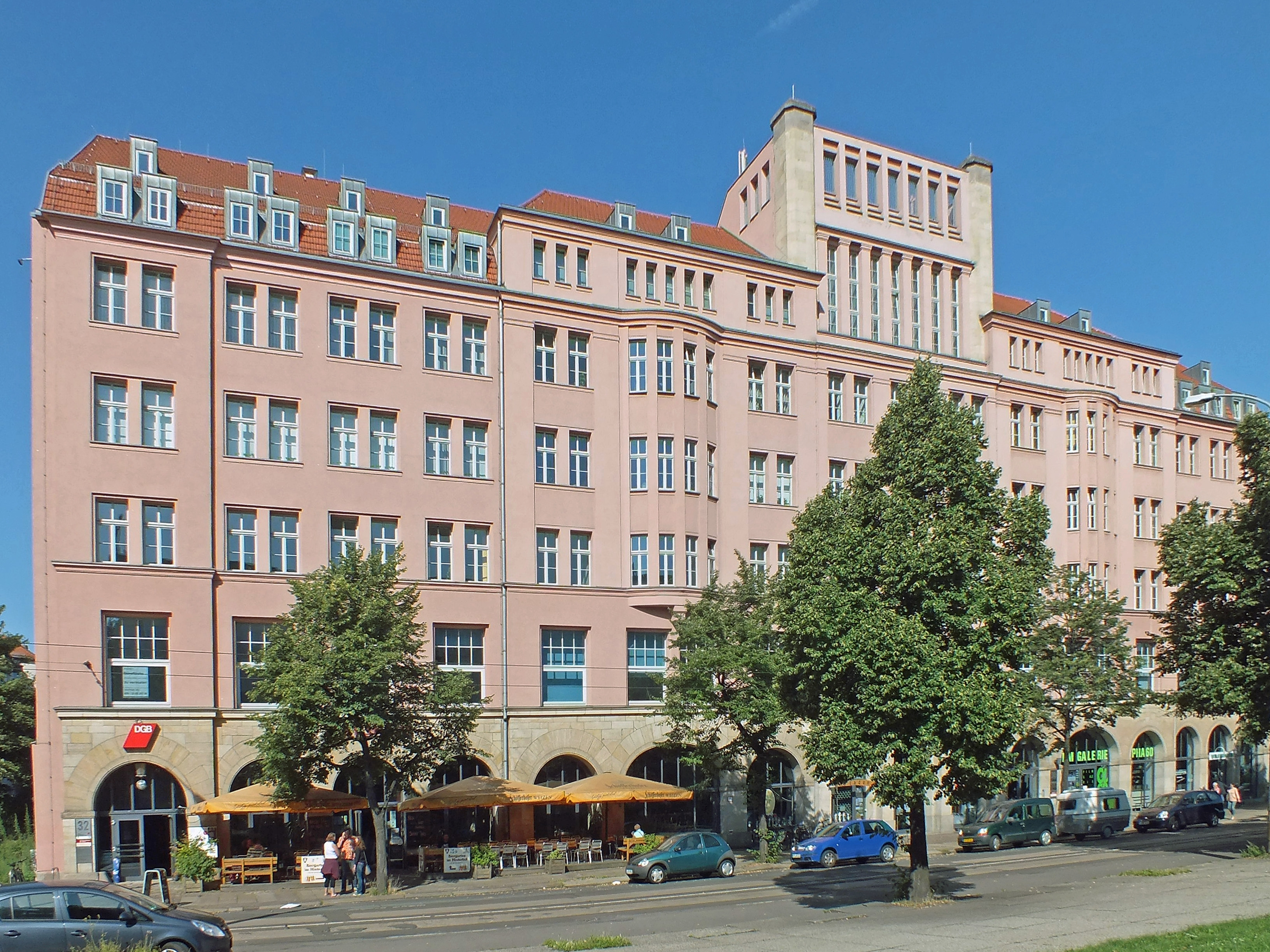
The Volkshaus at n°30

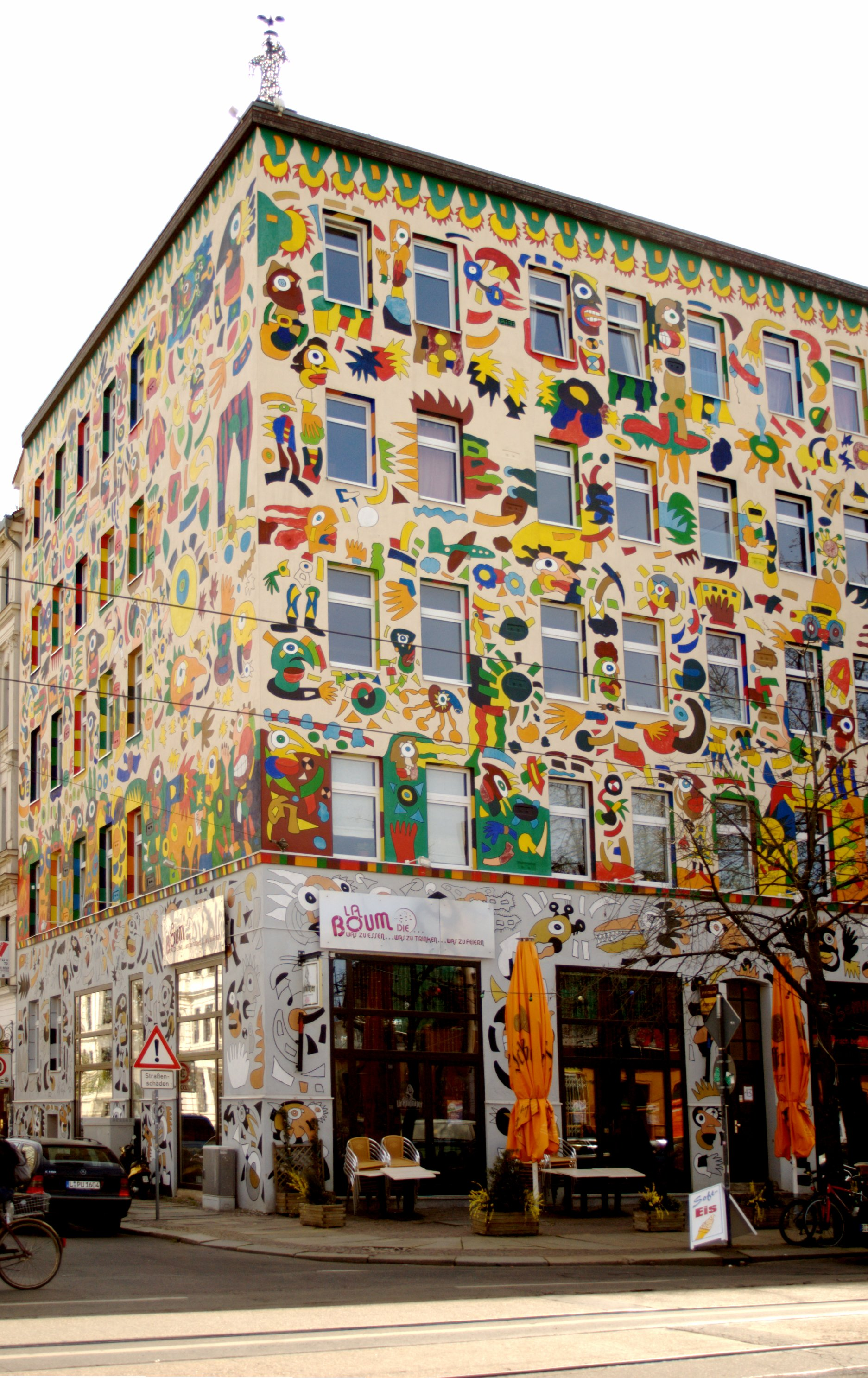
Facade decorated by Michael Fischer at no. 43.

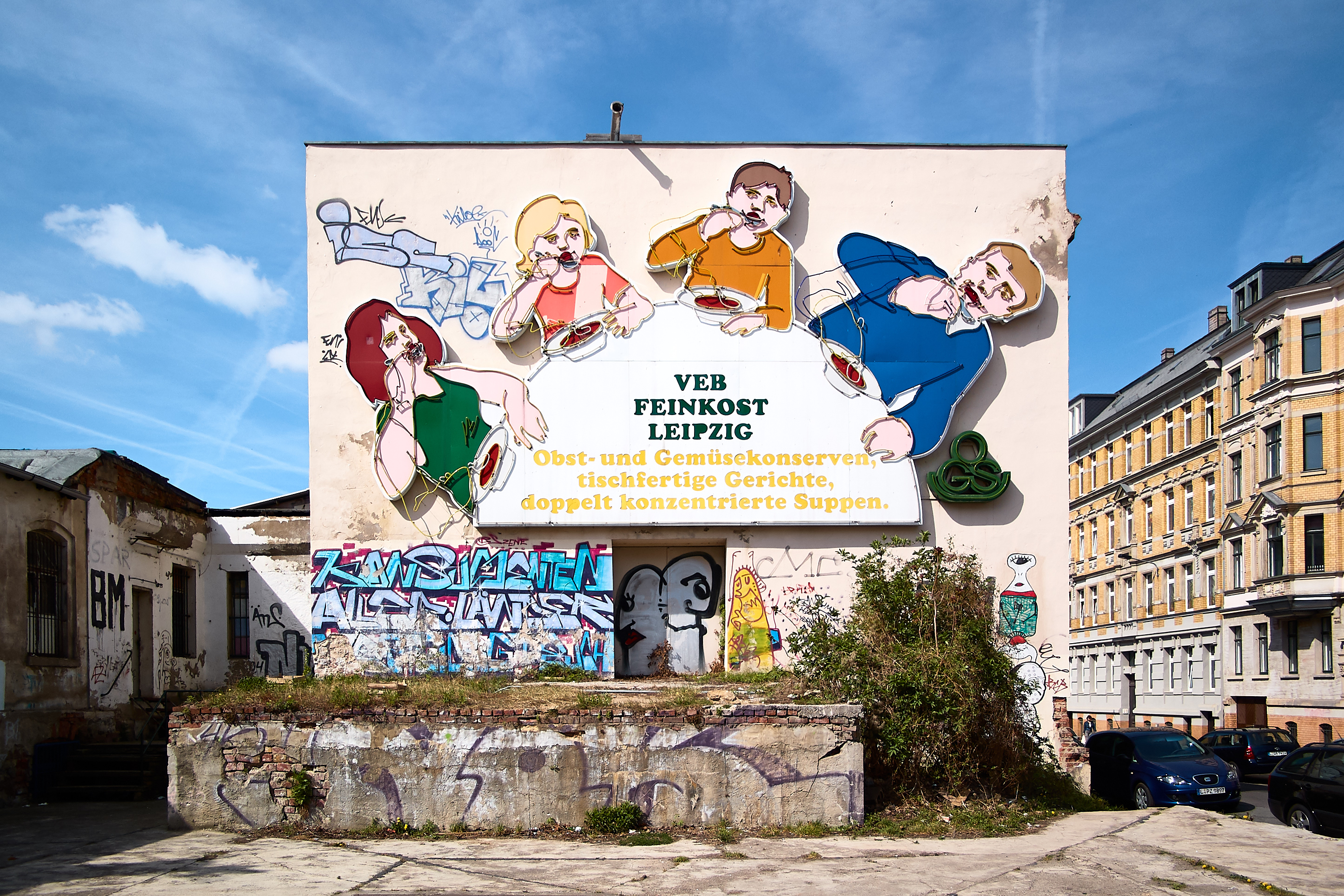
Former storefront of the Löffelfamilie, a neon sign from the GDR.

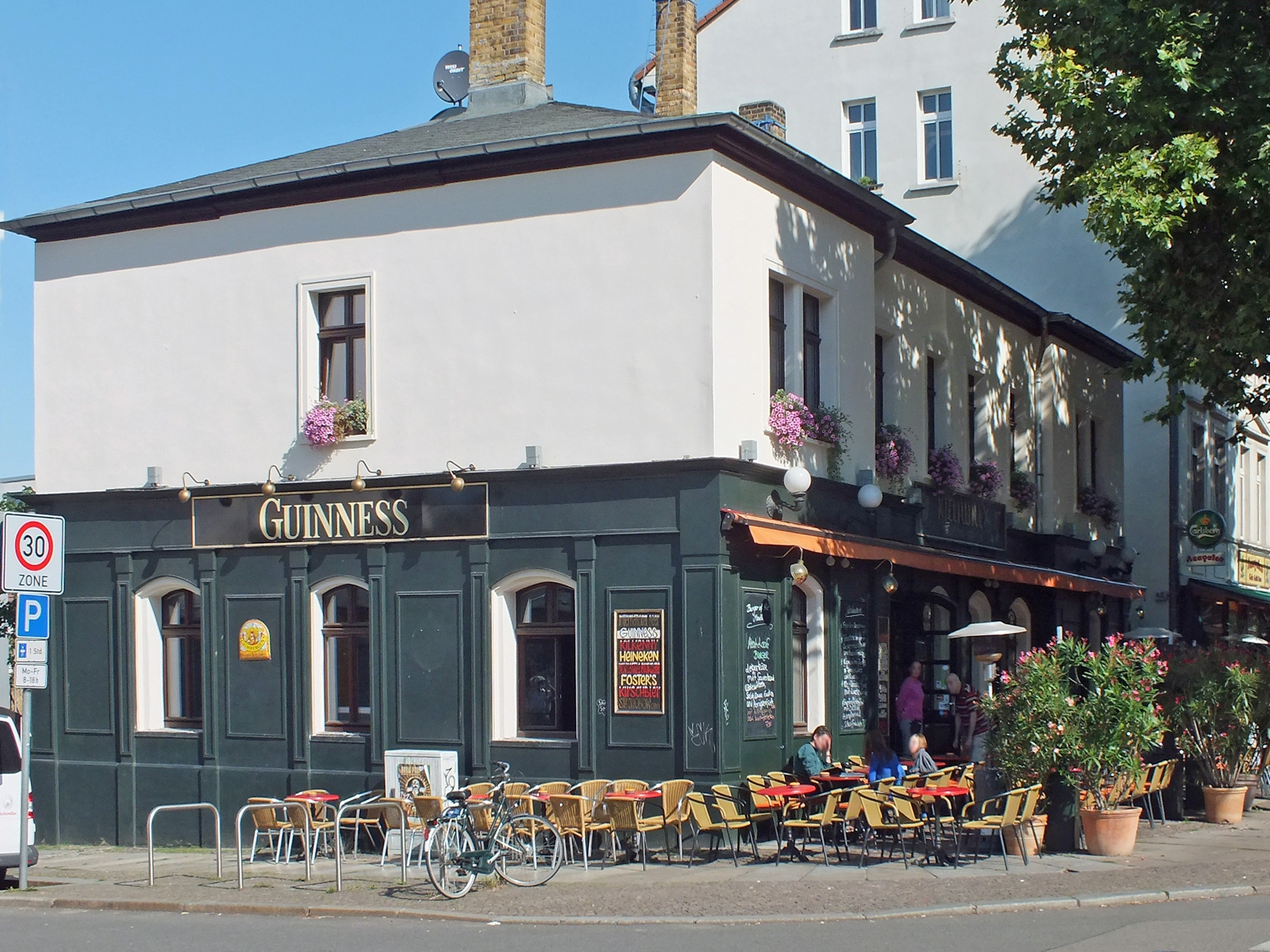
Zeitz Gatehouse built in 1856, converted into an Irish pub at no. 44.

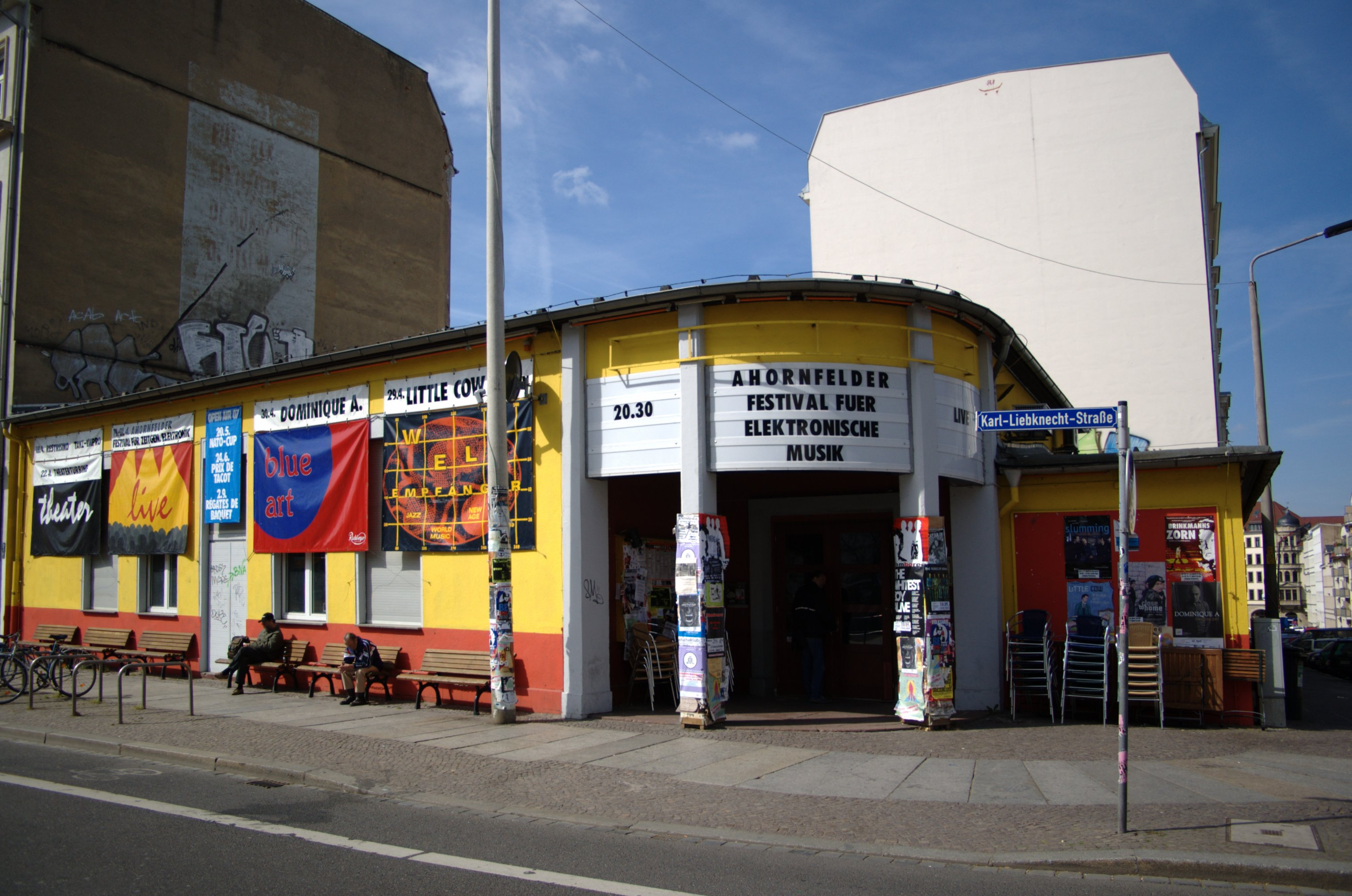
The naTo cultural house at no. 46

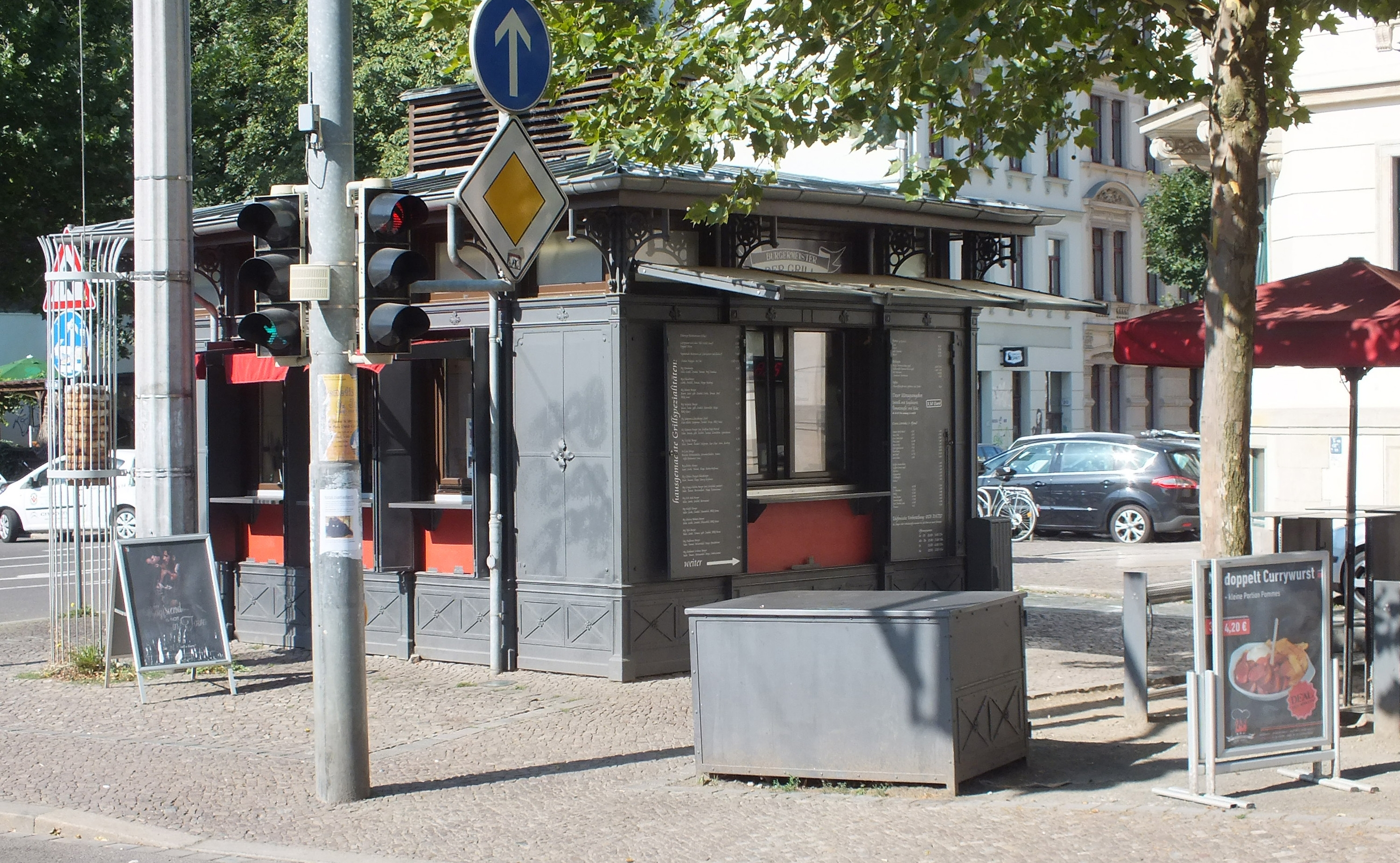
Former public toilet converted into a kiosk at Südplatz 1.

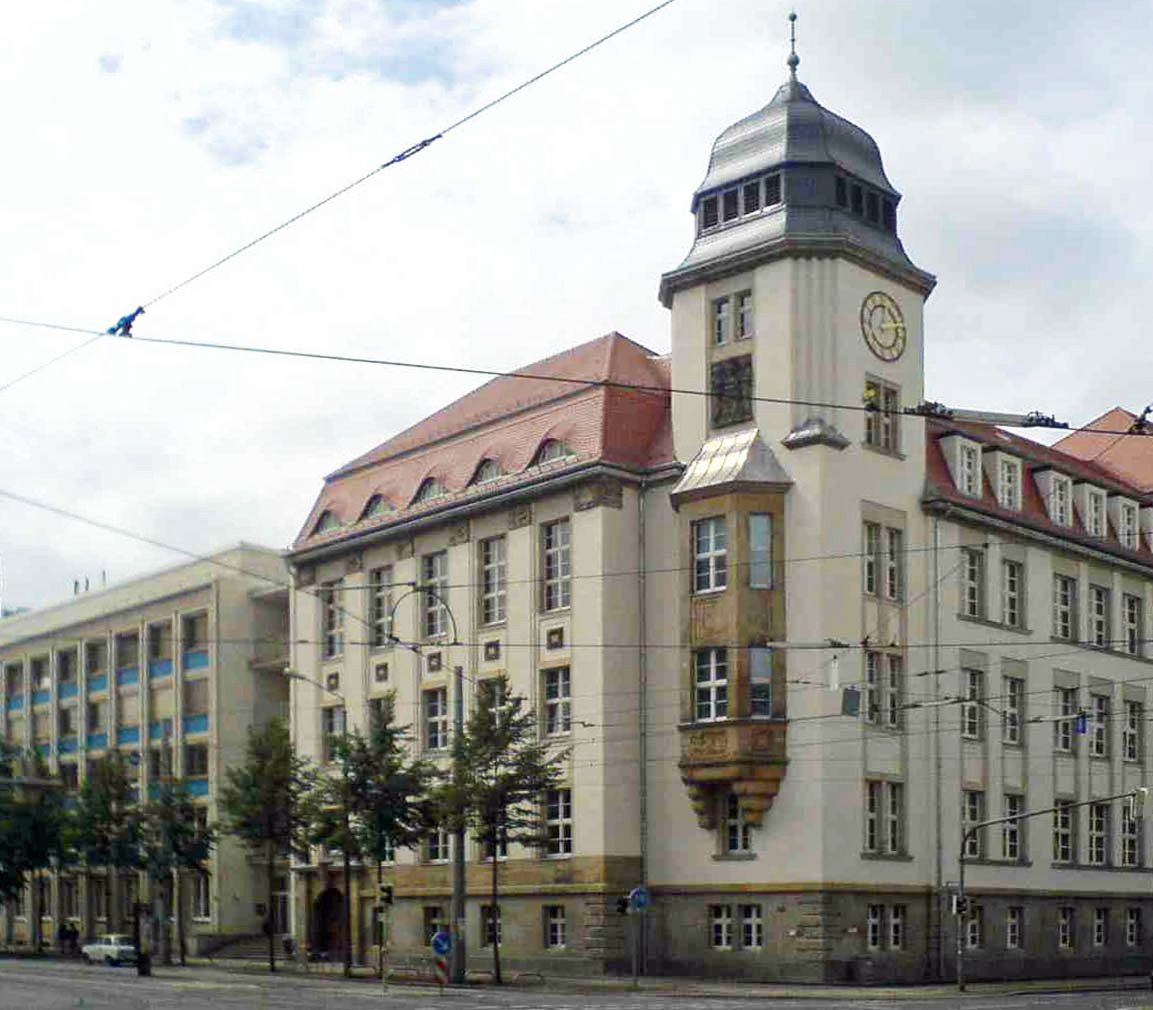
The headquarters of the Leipzig University of Applied Sciences (HTWK) at No. 145.

== See also ==
- List of streets and squares in Leipzig
