= Südvorstadt (Leipzig) =

- Stadtteil of Leipzig
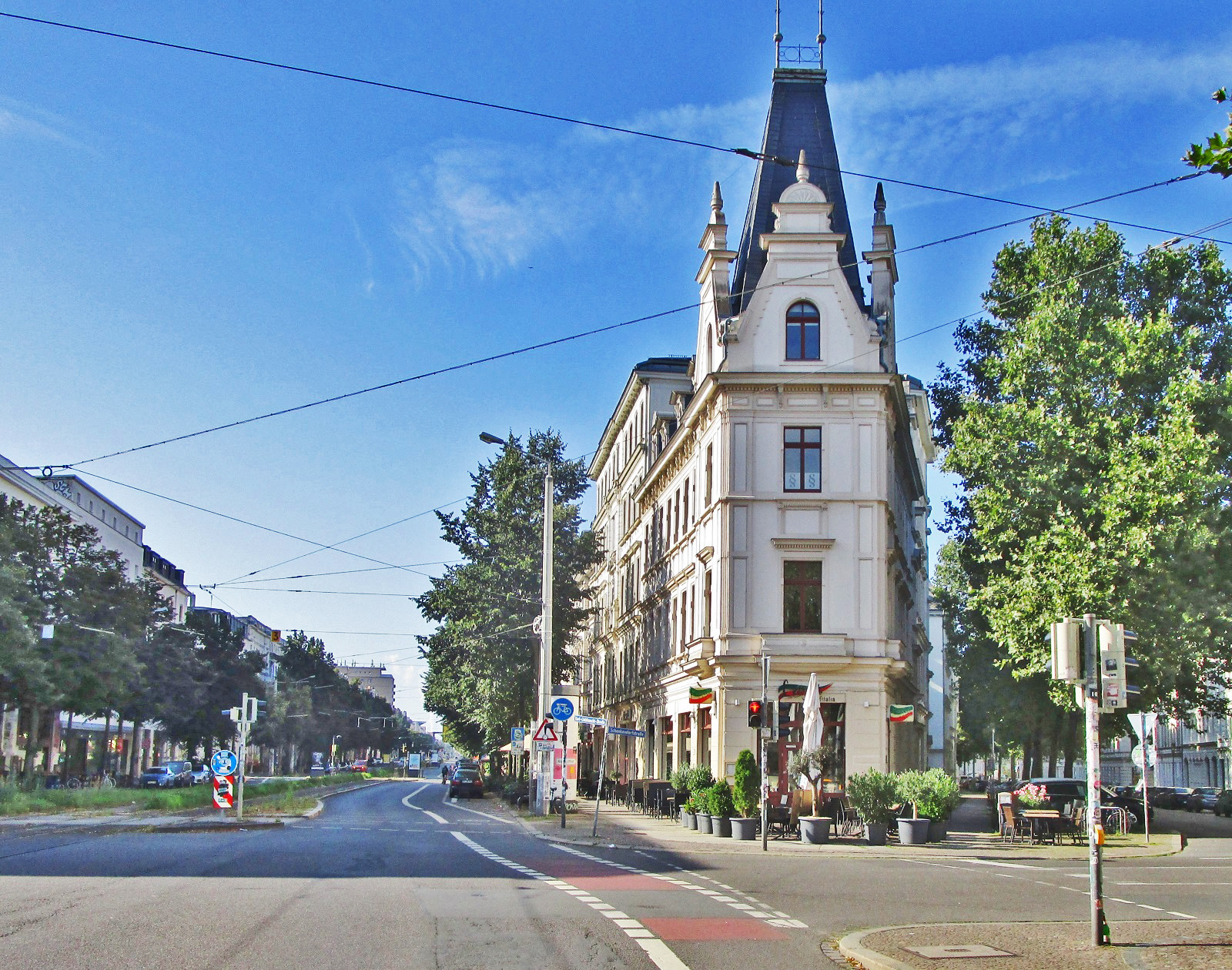
- Interactive map of Südvorstadt
- Location within Germany Location within Saxony
- Coordinates: 51°19′15″N 12°22′25″E
- Country: Germany
- State: Saxony
- District: Urban district
- City: Leipzig

Area
  - Total: 2.41 km^{2} (0.93 sq mi)

Population (2023-12-31)
  - Total: 26,528
  - Density: 11,000/km^{2} (28,500/sq mi)
- Time zone: UTC+01:00 (CET)
  - Summer (DST): UTC+02:00 (CEST)
- Postal codes: 04275, 04107
- Dialling codes: 0341

Südvorstadt (German pronunciation: [ˈzyːtfoːɐ̯ˌʃtat], lit. 'Southern Vorstadt') is a locality in the south borough (Stadtbezirk) of Leipzig, Germany.

The Südvorstadt is crossed from north to south by the Karl-Liebknecht-Strasse.

Due to its proximity to the city centre, but also to larger green spaces, it is a popular residential area with old buildings of the Gründerzeit period. The fact that it is particularly preferred by young people is explained in particular by the scene of advertising, cabaret and alternative developed along the Karl-Liebknecht-Strasse and the proximity of the Leipzig University.

== Population ==
Year	Residents
2000	16.909
2005	19.920
2010	22.470
2015	24.847
2020	26.255
2023	26.528

== Geography ==
The locality of Südvorstadt extends between the centre of the city and the Connewitz locality. It was established as an administrative unit when the city was divided into municipal areas in 1992 and does not fully coincide with the historic locality of Südvorstadt. The latter immediately began south of the Inner City Ring Road and is known as Inner Südvorstadt, which is part of the administrative locality Zentrum-Süd. However, the current locality of Südvorstadt comprises only the Outer Südvorstadt, whose northern border is the Körnerstrasse, Mahlmannstrasse and Rennbahnweg (1 km (0.62 mi) south of the Martin-Luther-Ring and 1.7 km (1.1 mi) south of Leipziger Markt).

The southern border of the Südvorstadt - to the nearby locality of Connewitz - runs along the Richard Lehmann-Strasse. It was also the city limits of Leipzig until Connewitz was incorporated into the city of Leipzig in 1891. To the east, Südvorstadt is bordered by the junction of the Leipzig-Hof railway line from the Bayerischer Bahnhof; beyond, the locality Zentrum-Süd is located. To the west, it borders the edges of Leipzig Riverside Forest, the west bank of the flood bed of the Elster and the streets Schleußiger Weg and Wundtstrasse being defined as the boundary of the locality. To the west is the locality of Schleußig or the forest Connewitzer Holz.

The locality - as a statistical district - has a north–south extension of 1.2 km (0.75 mi) and an east–west extension of 2 km (1.2 mi).

== Sites and culture ==
=== Buildings ===
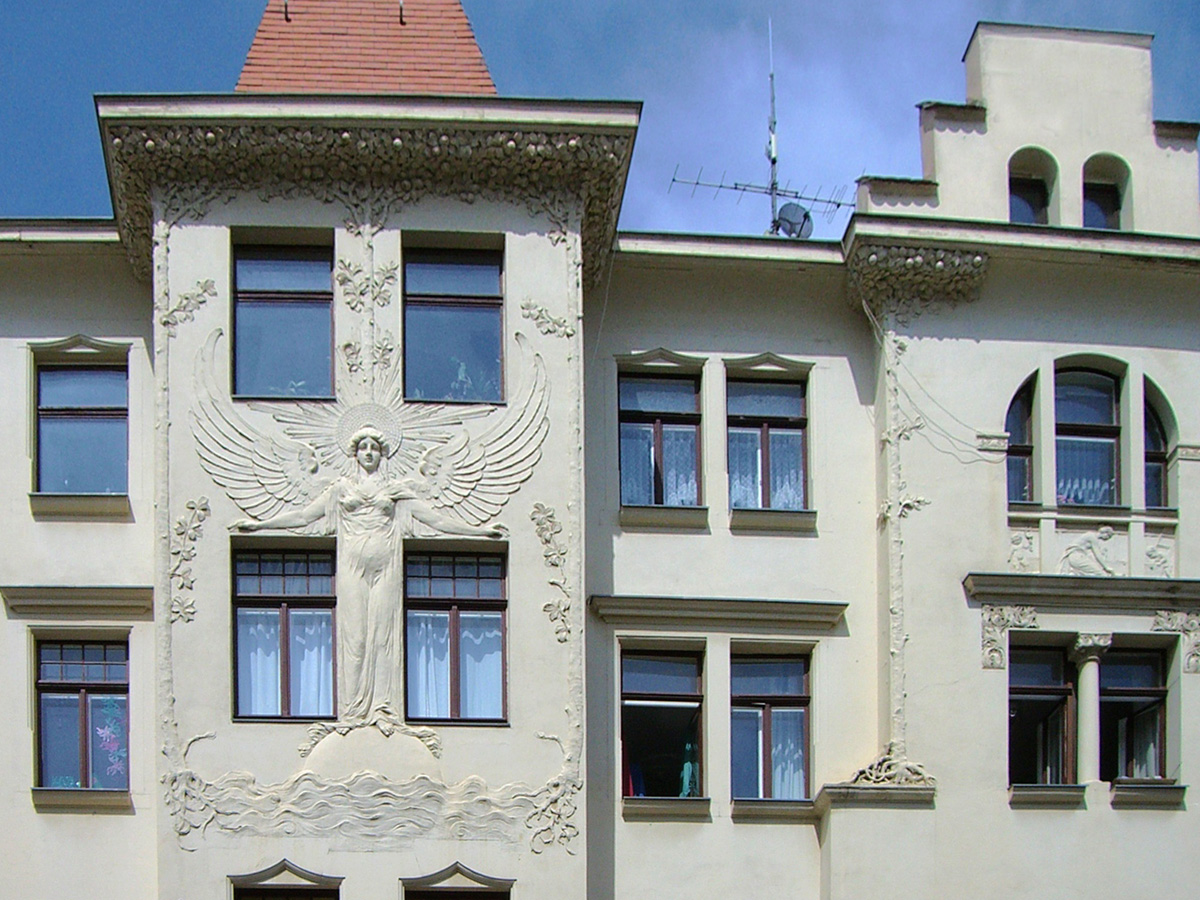
Art Nouveau facade on Arndtstrasse

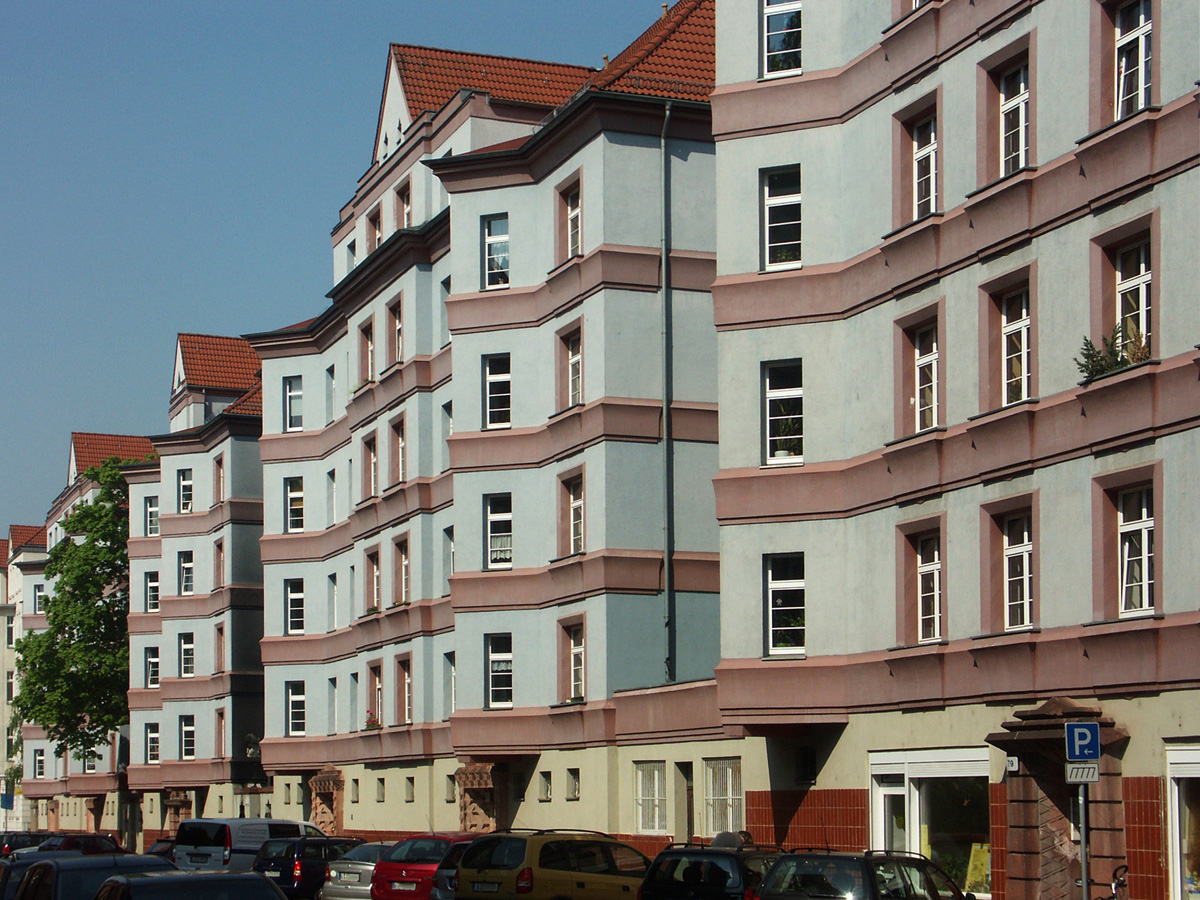
Art Deco building on Steinstrasse

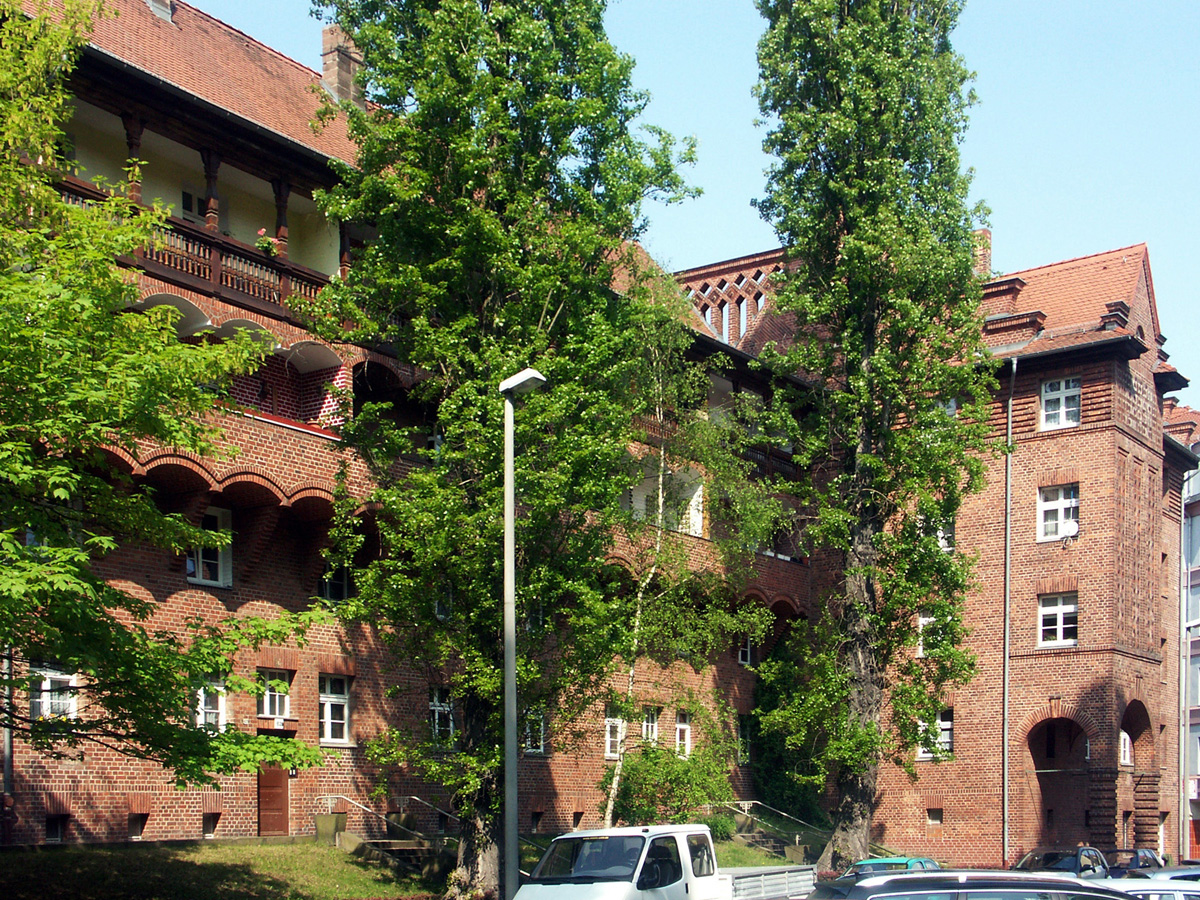
Lößniger Strasse (architect Carl James Büring)

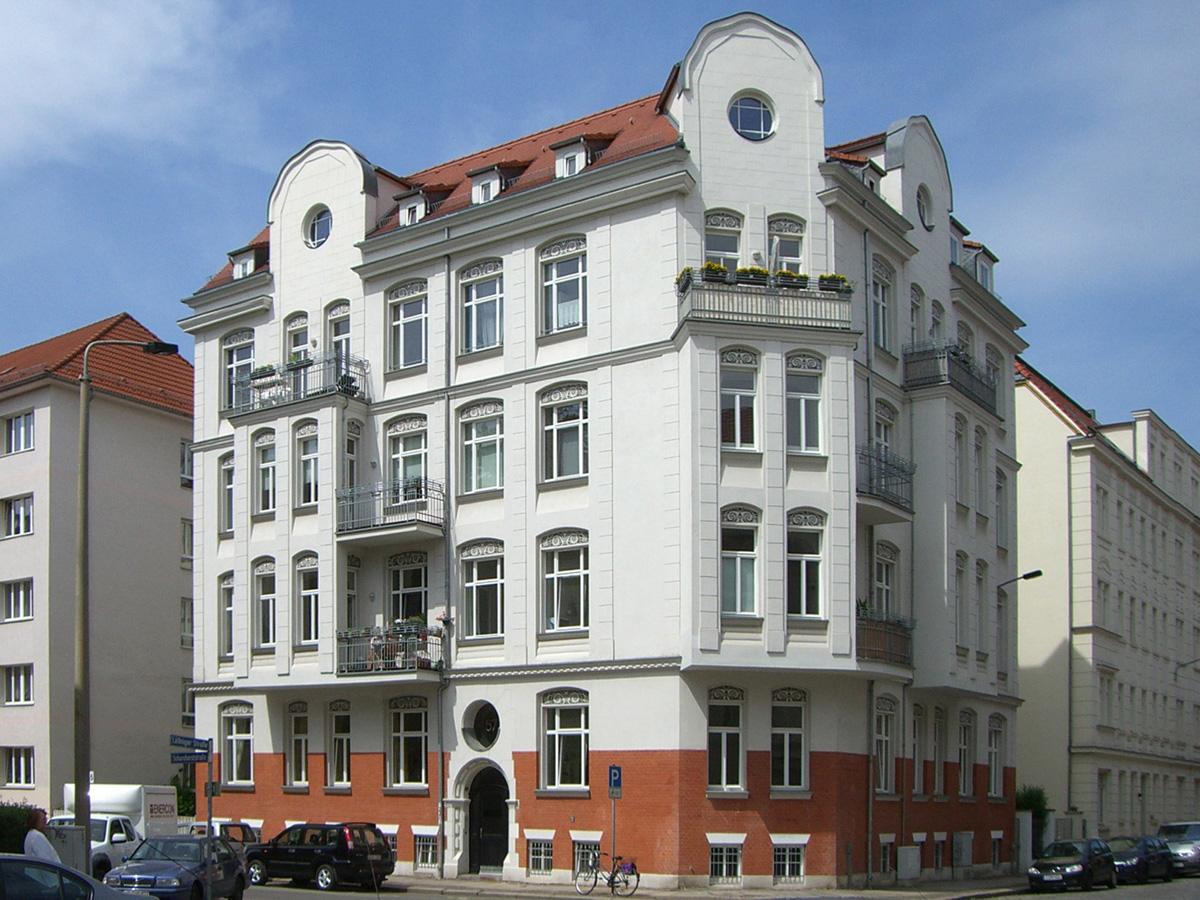
Residential building Lößniger at the corner of the Scharnhorststrasse

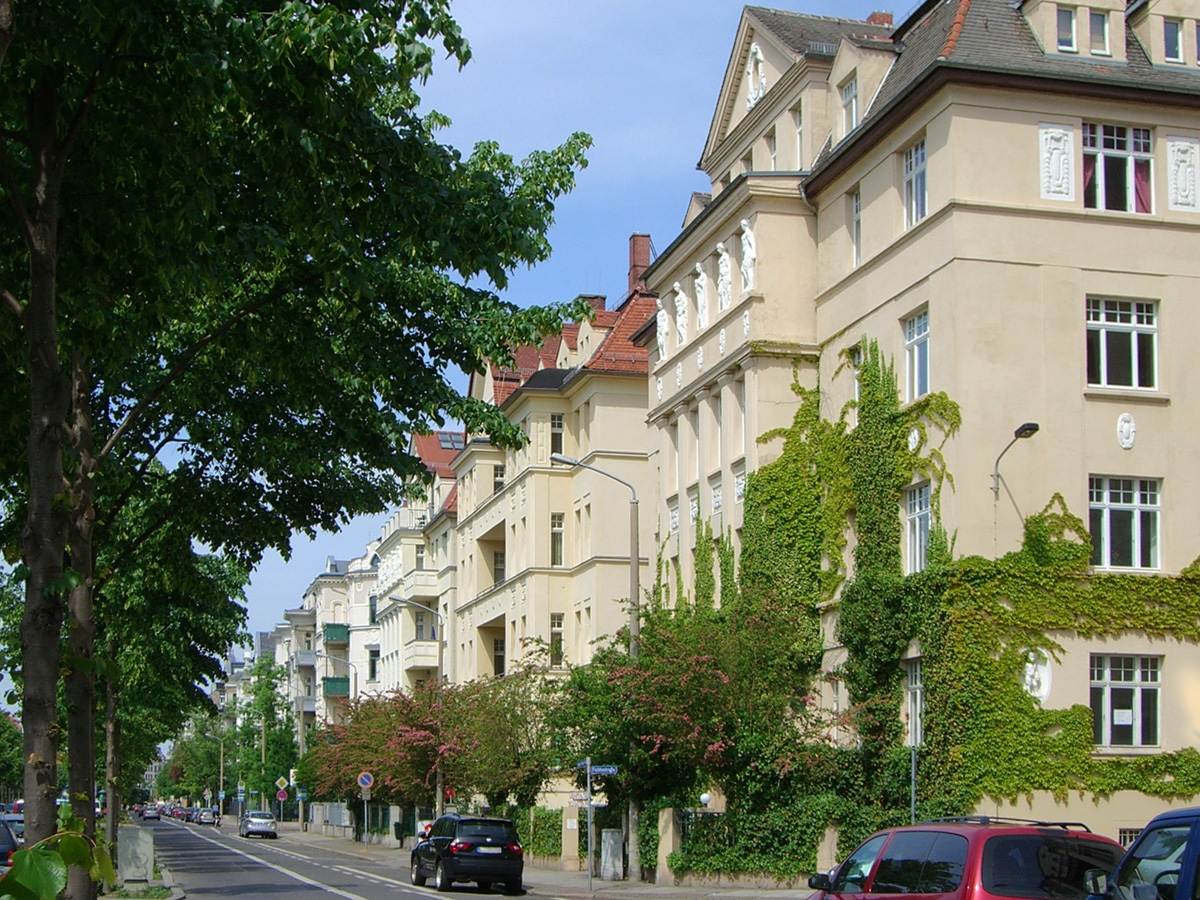
August-Bebel-Strasse

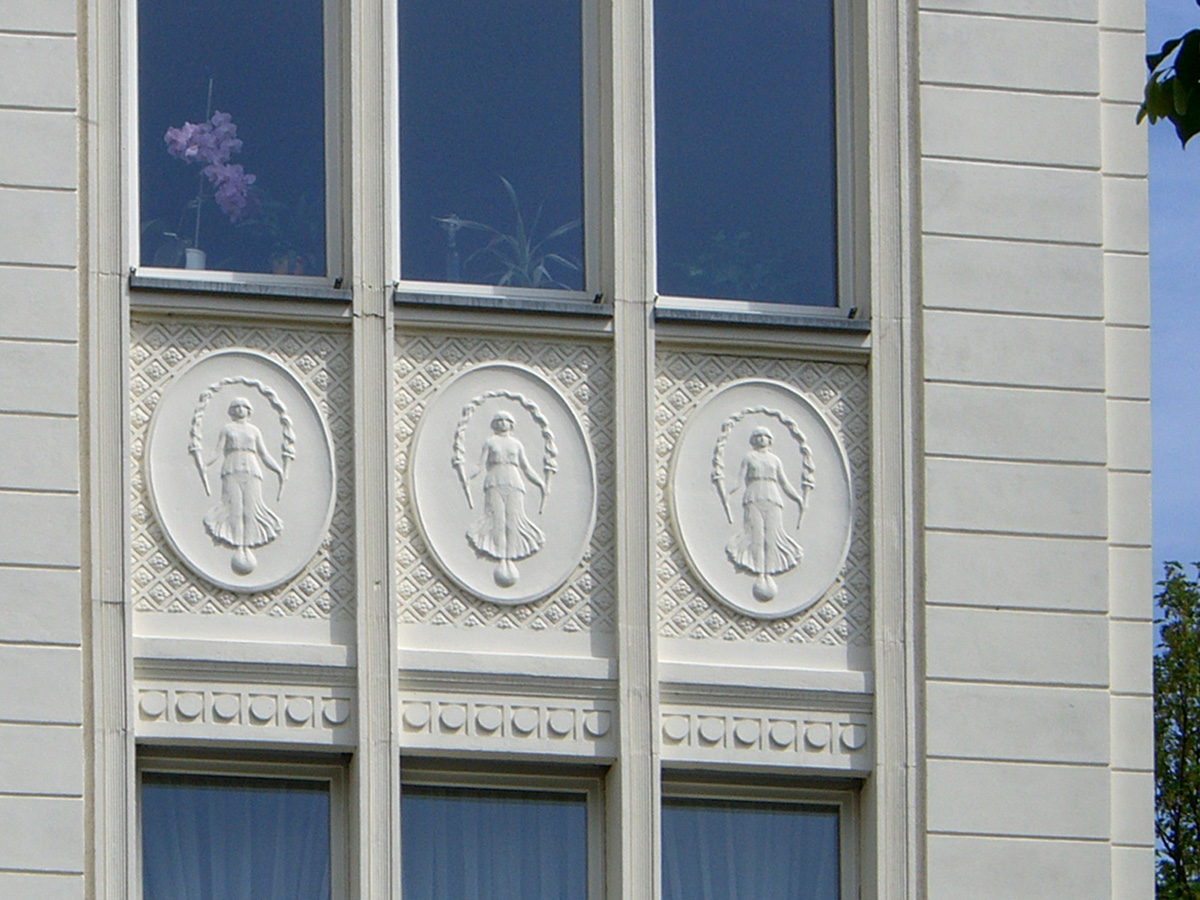
Detail of the facade of the
August-Bebel-Strasse

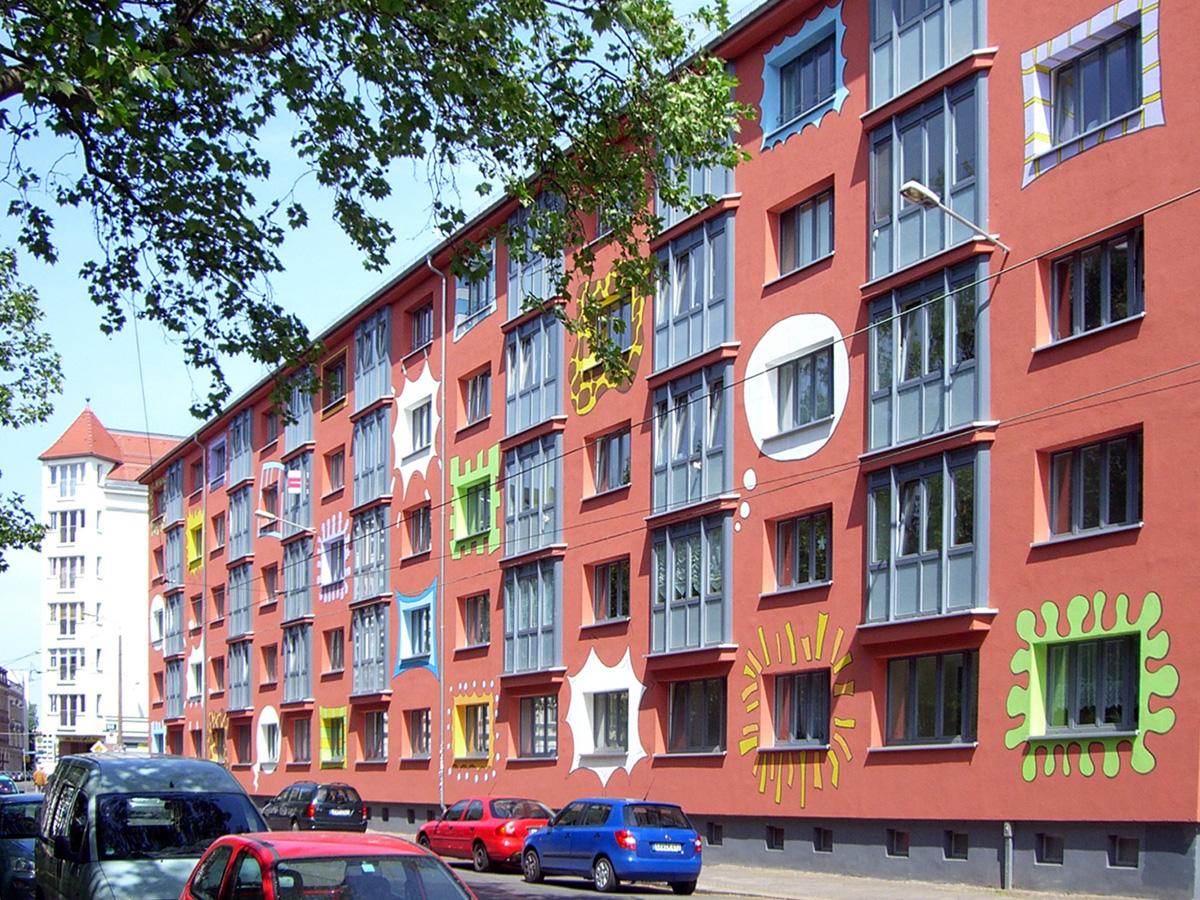
New renovated GDR building on Arthur-Hoffmann-Strasse

=== Culture and Leisure ===
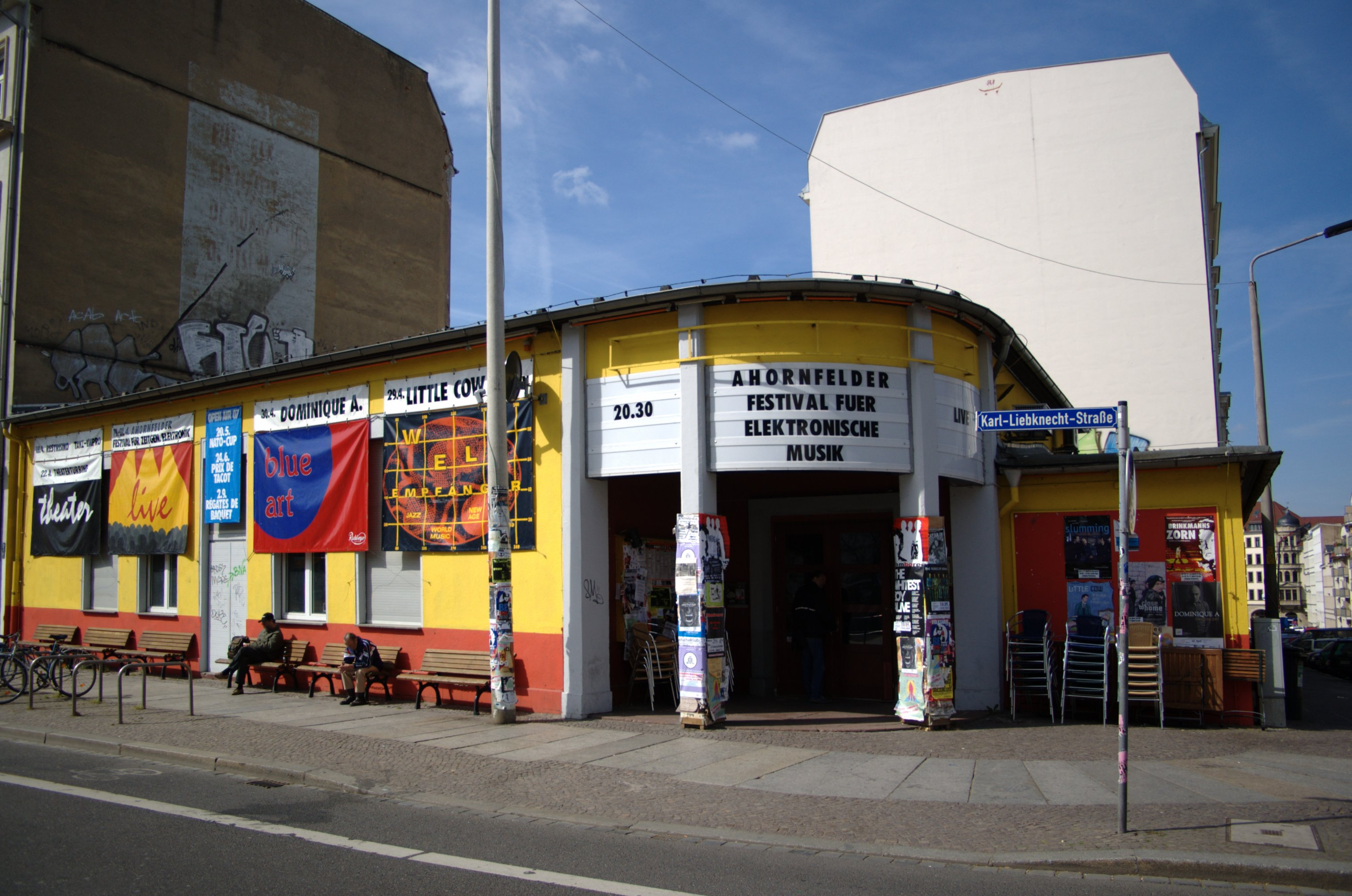
Entrance to the naTo

Karl-Liebknecht-Strasse has numerous restaurants, pubs and street cafes as well as small shops. Because of this, some people call this area of the Südvorstadt a trendy district.

The culture and communication center naTo formerly was a “Culture House of the National Front of the German Democratic Republic”. Actually, it is run by the association naTo e. V. culture and communications center and offers concerts, arthouse cinema, literary readings, theater performances, and events on political topics. The Distillery is more special. It is the oldest techno club in East Germany and is one of the fifteen best known and most influential techno clubs in Germany. In the “Haus Steinstraße”, the “Haus Steinstraße e. V. – Association for Culture, Education, and Contacts” offers cultural and educational programs for children and young people in workshops on theater, dance, music, painting, graphics, printing, ceramics, new media, inventing, and building. The building is also home to the DachTheater Leipzig, a stage for children and young amateur actors. Professionals, on the other hand, master TV shows with audience participation such as “Riverboat” or “Sonntag!” (in English: Sunday!) in the Media City studios.

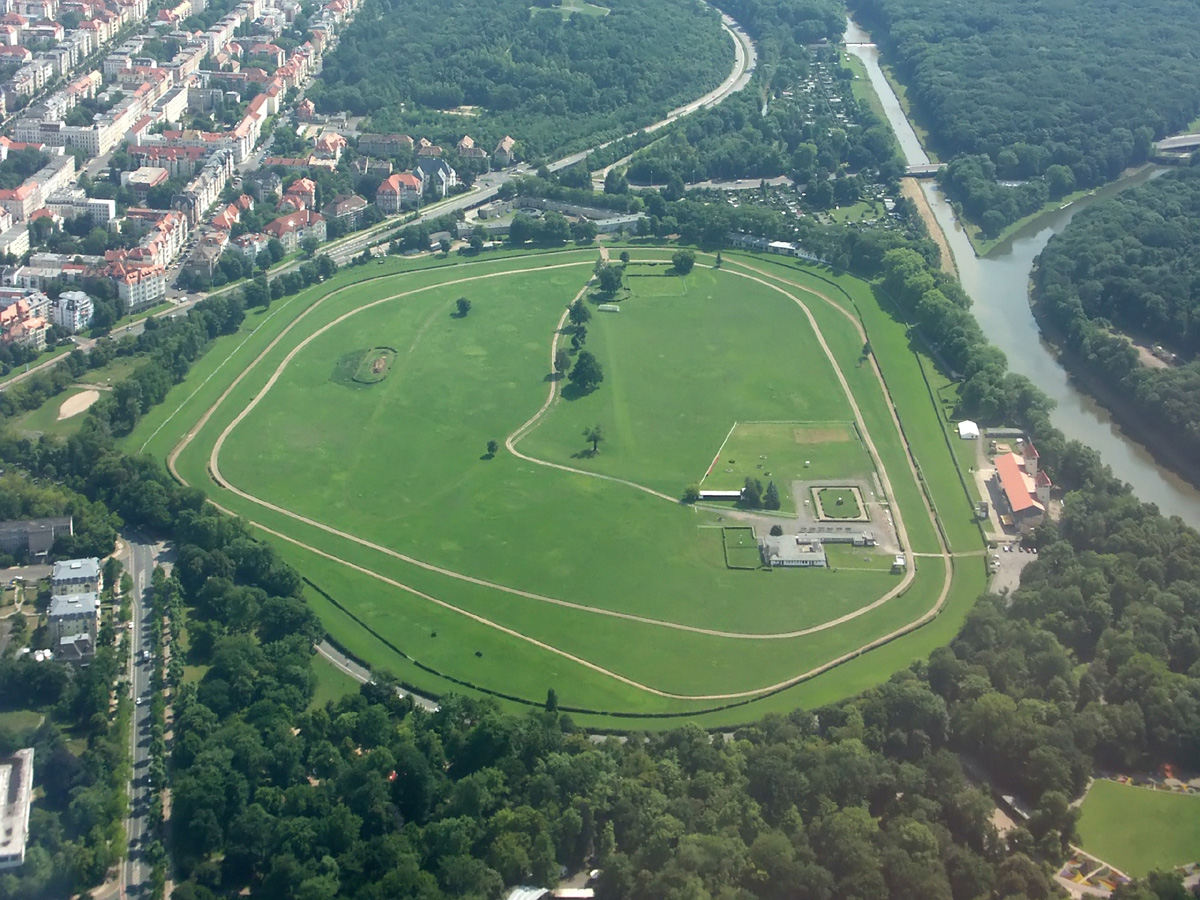
Scheibenholz horse racing venue

The traditional Scheibenholz horse racing venue forms the transition to the park and the riverside forest. In 1867, it was the fourth race track to be established in Germany, but today it only hosts a few race days every year.

The Fockeberg, which is also part of the Südvorstadt locality, was created from the city's war rubble but is now covered in forest, offers a view of the entire city and is a popular place to relax. Sports (Fockeberg run) and other competitions are held on its grounds.

South of the horse racing venue is the “Südvorstadt” allotment garden section, founded in 1874. It is the second oldest allotment garden complex in Leipzig.

== Traffic ==
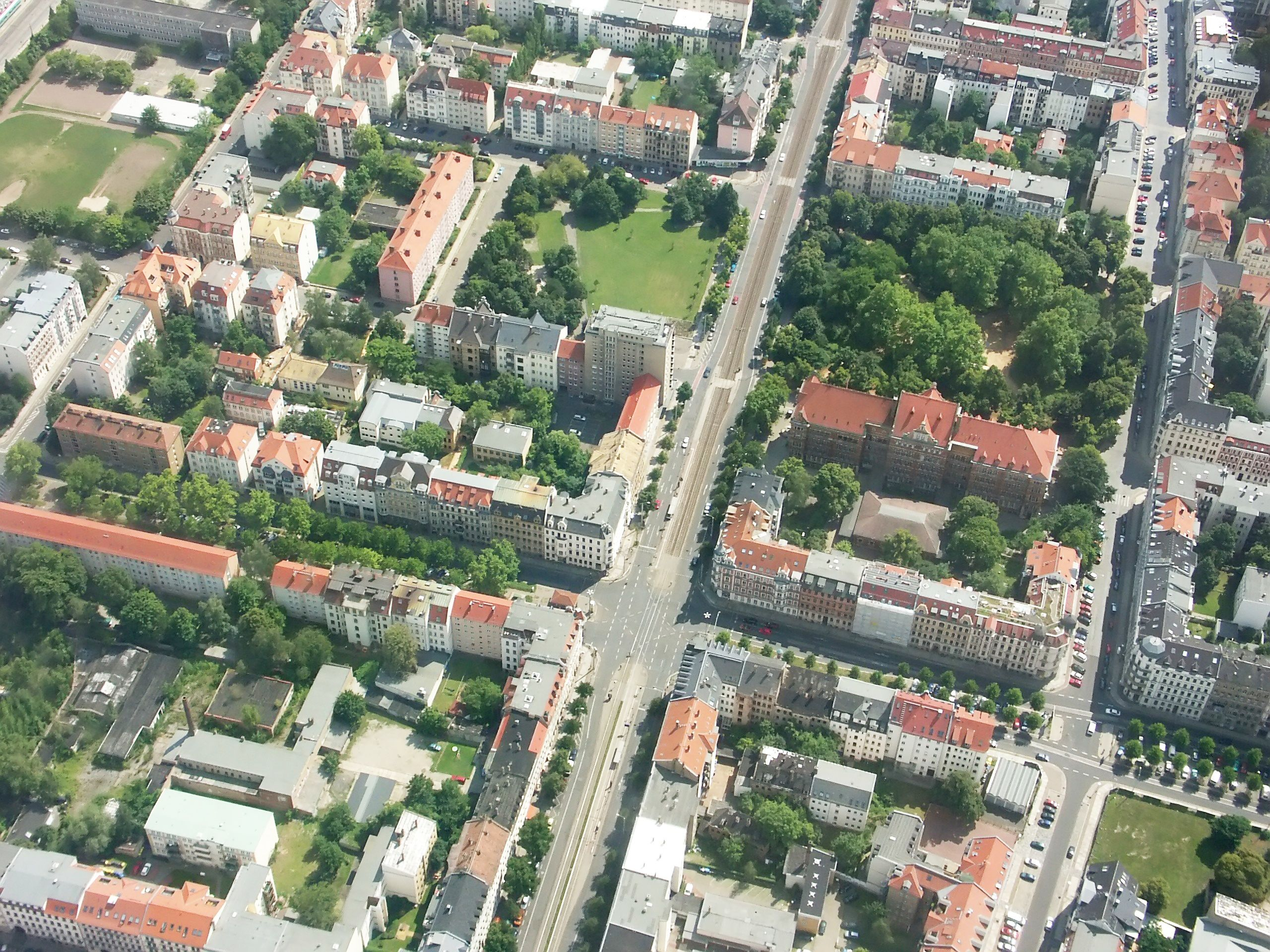
Intersection of Kurt-Eisner-/Karl-Liebknecht-Strasse

The main roads in the Südvorstadt are, in a north–south direction, Karl-Liebknecht-Strasse (formerly Süd- or Adolf-Hitler-Strasse), which is considered a promenade, Arthur-Hoffmann-Strasse (formerly Bayrische Strasse), August-Bebel-Straße (formerly Kaiser-Wilhelm-Strasse) which is laid out as an avenue with numerous representative buildings, and Wundtstrasse as a four-lane connection to the B 2. In an east–west direction, Richard-Lehmann-Strasse (= B 2, formerly Kaiserin-Augusta-Straße) runs along the southern border of the locality. Formerly, the connection via Kurt-Eisner-Strasse (formerly Kronprinz-Straße) to the southeastern localities was interrupted by the railway line. Nowadays, there are the ramp of the Leipzig City Tunnel and a street connection between Kurt-Eisner and Semmelweisstrasse via the Semmelweis Bridge, built between 2009 and 2010.

Tram lines 9, 10 and 11 as well as bus lines 60, 70, 74 and 89 run through the Südvorstadt. All lines through the city tunnel of the S-Bahn Mitteldeutschland (S 1 - S 6) stop at the Leipzig MDR station on the eastern edge of the locality (access via Semmelweisstrasse).

Kochstrasse is of historical importance in terms of transport. It was the old connecting route from Leipzig to Connewitz, which was also known as Connewitzer Chaussee. It used to be part of the medieval trade route Via Imperii. From 1872 onwards, the Leipzig horse-drawn tram ran along it to Connewitz.

== See also ==
- List of streets and squares in Leipzig
