= Chief Scientific Officer (England) =

The Chief Scientific Officer in England is the head of profession for the 53,000 healthcare scientists working in the National Health Service and its associated bodies.

The Chief Scientific Officer is one of the NHS professional officers (including the National Medical Director and Chief Nursing Officer) who are employed within NHS England. These roles lead their own professional groups as well as providing expert knowledge about their specific disciplines to the NHS and wider healthcare system.

The Chief Scientific Officer provides professional leadership and expert clinical advice across the health system, as well as working alongside senior clinical leaders within NHS England and the broader commissioning system. The Chief Scientific Officer is also responsibility for delivering the Government's strategy for a modernised healthcare science workforce, Modernising Scientific Careers.

Professor Sue Hill has been the Chief Scientific Officer since October 2002, first within the Department of Health and subsequently NHS England. The role was strengthened in March 2023 with the appointment of a Deputy Chief Scientific Officer.
