= Chief experimental officer =

A chief experimental officer (CEO) is the head of an experimental organization, especially in the military or civil service.

Chief Experimental Officer has been the topmost class in the Experimental Officer Class of the British Civil Service.

== See also ==
- Chief executive officer (CEO)
- Chief innovation officer (CINO)
- Chief scientific officer (CSO)
- Chief technology officer (CTO)
- Government scientist
