= Register of Clinical Technologists =

Professional register

- Formation: August 2000
- Type: Voluntary
- Headquarters: York
- Location: United Kingdom
- Members: 2,300 active
- Official language: English
- Website: http://therct.org.uk/

The Register of Clinical Technologists (RCT) is a voluntary professional register for clinical technologists and practitioners specialising in the practical application of physics, engineering and technology to clinical practice in the UK. Registrants work in NHS hospitals, private health care, academic institutions and the medical device industry.

== History ==
The Register was formed in August 2000 as the Voluntary Register of Clinical Technologists (VRCT), with the aim of protecting the public by advocating statutory, professional regulation for Clinical Technologists. Despite the name change to RCT, membership of the register remains voluntary to this day and the number of active members is falling. Management of the Register was undertaken by members of the Institute of Physics and Engineering in Medicine (IPEM), the Association of Renal Technologists and the Institution of Incorporated Engineers (now the Institution of Engineering and Technology).

At its formation, the Register was designed to be a platform for the Clinical Technologist profession's campaign for statutory regulation with the then Health Professions’ Council (HPC). However, in 2011 the UK Government Command Paper ‘Enabling Excellence: Autonomy and Accountability for Health and Social Care Staff’ stated that extensions to statutory regulation "will only be considered where there is a compelling case on the basis of a public safety risk and where assured voluntary registers are not considered sufficient to manage this risk", and indicated that the way forward would be via assured voluntary registration. This was subsequently developed into a system of Accredited Registers administered by the Profession Standards Authority (PSA).

In 2013, at the request of the VCRT Management Panel, the management of the register was integrated into the professional work of IPEM, in order to provide a firmer footing for an application to the PSA to become an Accredited Register. In 2015, the Register was successful in achieving accreditation. In Dec 2023, the PSA is carrying out a re-accreditation assessment of the RCT.

In January 2024 the cost of yearly membership of the register has risen from £30 in 2023 to £48 per year.
