= Leipzig University of Applied Sciences =

University of Applied Sciences

Coordinates: 51°18′51″N 12°22′21″E

- Hochschule für Technik, Wirtschaft und Kultur Leipzig
- Motto: Technik, Wirtschaft und Kultur – WissenschafftVerbindung
- Motto in English: Technology, Economy and Culture connected by science
- Type: Public research university
- Established: 1992
- Rector: Jean-Alexander Müller
- Students: 6.580 (WS 2023/24)
- Location: Leipzig, Saxony, Germany
- Campus: Urban
- Website: www.htwk-leipzig.de

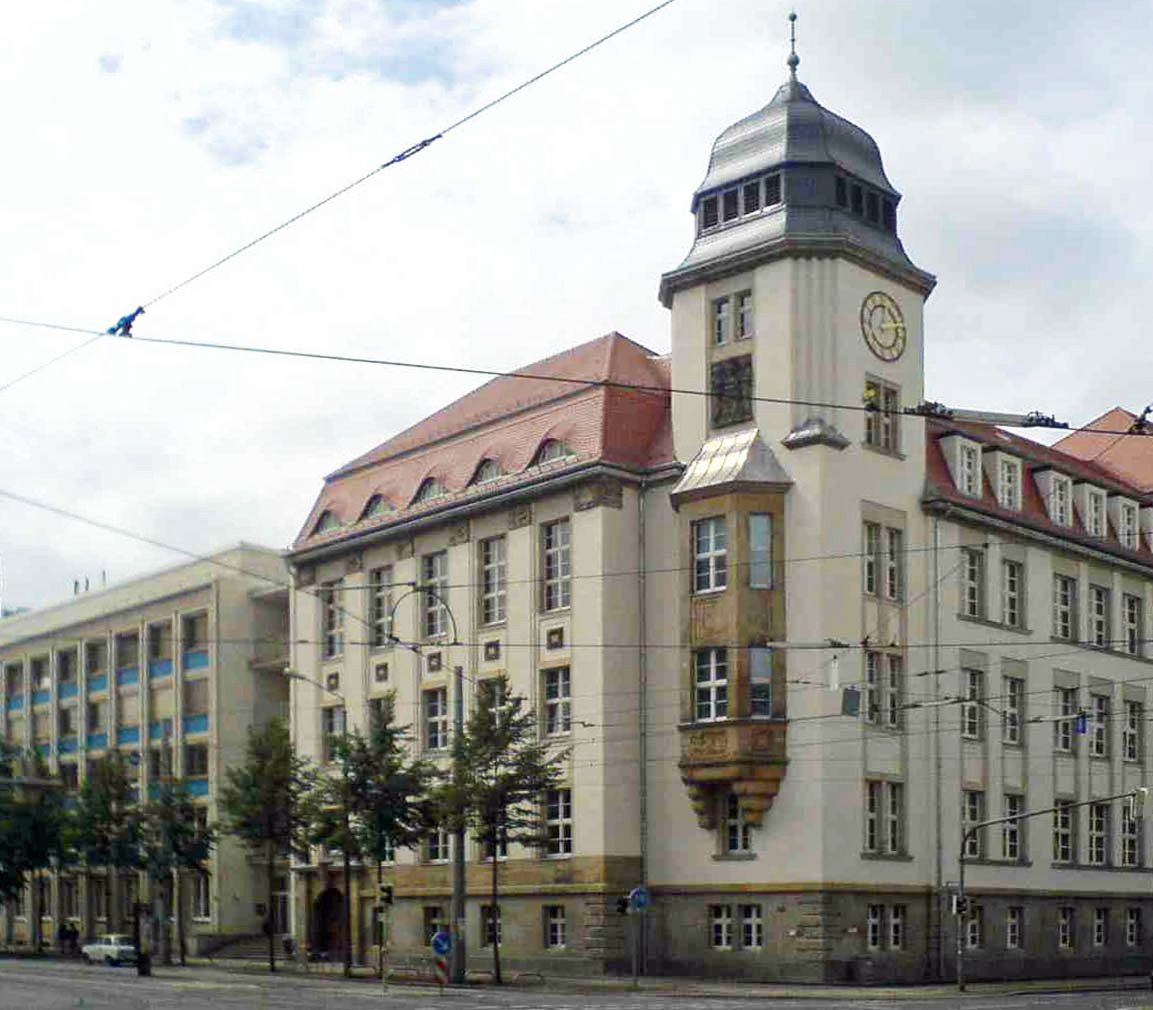
Building of the Leipzig University of Applied Sciences

The Leipzig University of Applied Sciences, in German the Hochschule für Technik, Wirtschaft und Kultur (HTWK), is a Fachhochschule in Leipzig, in the Saxony region of Germany. It offers a combination of practice-oriented teaching and application-driven research, with a particularly broad spectrum of engineering and technical disciplines, as well as in the fields of economics, social science and culture. It offers more than 40 degree courses. There are currently about 6,600 students enrolled at HTWK Leipzig.

== History ==
The Leipzig University of Applied Sciences Leipzig was founded on 15 July 1992. It was founded by the Leipzig University of Technology, the Leipzig School of Librarians and Booksellers, the School of Librarianship, and the Institute of Museology.

== Location and buildings ==
The main campus with 13 buildings is located along the streets Karl-Liebknecht-Straße, Gustav-Freytag-Straße, Eichendorffstraße and Kochstraße in Leipzig-Connewitz. Outside the main campus are three other university buildings: the Wiener-Bau of the Faculty of Electrical Engineering and Information Technology in Wächterstraße / Zentrum-Süd, the Life Science & Engineering research center in Eilenburger Straße / Reudnitz, and the sports hall on Arno-Nitzsche-Straße. In recent years, the campus has been supplemented by new buildings, most recently the Hopper and Shannon Buildings (occupied by the Faculty of Digital Transformation) in the Plagwitz area of the city in 2019.

== Faculties ==
- Faculty of Architecture and Social Sciences
- Faculty of Business Administration and Industrial Engineering
- Faculty of Civil Engineering
- Faculty of Computer Science and Media
- Faculty of Engineering
- Faculty of Digital Transformation

== Rectors ==
- Klaus Steinbock, Founder (1992-2003), professor of automation engineering
- Manfred Nietner (2003-2006), professor of production techniques
- Hubertus Milke (2006-2011), professor of water management, hydrology and settlement water management
- Michael Kubessa (2011), professor of supply and disposal technology
- Renate Lieckfeldt (2011-2013), professor of technical management and project management
- Markus Krabbes (2013-2014), professor of information systems
- Gesine Grande (2014-2019), professor of psychology
- Mark Mietzner (2019-2024), professor of banking and finance
- Jean-Alexander Müller (2024-present), professor of computer networks

== Lecturers ==
- Lecturers at the Leipzig University of Applied Sciences

== University library ==
The library supports students, staff and academic programmes with a variety of services. It offers study places and study rooms for individuals or groups as well as workshops on topics such as information literacy and reference management programmes.

The library's holdings include:

- 280.000 print volumes
- 360 print journals
- 52.000 e-books
- 26.000 e-journals
- 190 licensed databases
