= Academy for Healthcare Science (United Kingdom) =

The Academy for Healthcare Science (AHCS) is a United Kingdom body which brings together the UK's Healthcare science community under a common umbrella. It plays an important role in the statutory regulation of Healthcare Scientists following the completion of Modernising Scientific Careers training programme and works closely with the National School of Healthcare Science

== Role and function ==
The Academy for Healthcare Science has four main roles:

- To provide a unified professional voice for the healthcare science workforce
- To act as the overarching body for issues related to education, training and development in the UK health system and beyond. This includes both maintaining professional standards and quality management of education and training
- To ensure the Healthcare science profession has a high profile that influences and informs the health & care system in the UK
- To provide engagement and support for wider strategic scientific initiatives

== Registration ==
The regulatory arrangements for the healthcare science workforce in the United Kingdom combine statutory registration with accredited voluntary registers. Traditionally, several healthcare science disciplines (such as biomedical scientists and clinical scientists) have held legally protected titles, requiring statutory registration with the Health and Care Professions Council (HCPC) to practice. Other healthcare science disciplines—such as sterile processing and decontamination sciences—do not hold statutory HCPC title protection and instead operate through voluntary registers and professional directories administered by the AHCS, including dedicated directories for Institute of Decontamination Sciences technical certificate holders and chartered members.

The introduction of structured education and training pathways under Modernising Scientific Careers established a unified framework for registration across healthcare science career levels—spanning associates, practitioners, and higher specialist scientists—accounting for the differing statutory requirements across roles.
