= Home modifications =

Changes to the home to improve safety and independence

Home modifications are defined as environmental interventions aiming to support activity performance in the home. More specifically, home modifications often are changes made to the home environment to help people with functional disability or impairment to be more independent and safe in their own homes and reduce any risk of injury to themselves or their caregivers. Examples of home modifications include installing ramps and rails, altering kitchen and bathroom areas (relocating switches and lowering bench heights), installing emergency alarms.

There are a number of words in common use that are confused with home modifications. For example, home modification is more than home improvement, home renovation or remodelling; those three terms refer to changes made to housing for purposes other than disability.

Other more closely related terms that are interchanged with home modifications in literature include combinations of home/housing/environment/residential coupled with modification/adaptation/intervention. Each of these terms has a nuanced meaning analysed in further detail by Bridge (2006). However these terms have in common a context of housing, health and care for people with disability or impairment. Home modifications directly impact the accessibility to and within a home and are considered one aspect of the complex relationship between housing and health. Home modifications are also the subject of ongoing public health and economics research because of their potential to support aging in place and substitute for caregiving. In addition to aging in place and caregiving, there is some evidence that home modifications can reduce falls in the home.
