= Rehabilitation Engineering and Assistive Technology Society of North America =

American association for technology and disabilities

The Rehabilitation Engineering and Assistive Technology Society of North America (RESNA) is an association of people with an interest in technology and disability. Its mission statement notes that RESNA's mission is to improve the potential of people with disabilities to achieve their goals through the use of technology through promoting research, development, education, advocacy and provision of technology; and by supporting the assistive technology service providers engaged in these activities.

RESNA was started in August 1979. In 1993 RESNA became a self-managed organization. RESNA has over 1,000 members, the bulk of whom are concentrated in the US and Canada.

Beginning in 1995, RESNA developed certification programs for credentialing professionals working as assistive technology service providers. These certification programs are administered through RESNA's Professional Standards Board (PSB), which includes representatives from RESNA, the National Registry of Rehabilitation Technology Suppliers (NRRTS), and consumers. In December 2015, the Rehabilitation Engineering Assistive Technology Society of North America (RESNA) updated the WC18 standards for wheelchair tie-down and occupant restraint systems (WTORS) standards for wheelchair tie-down and occupant restraint systems (WTORS). RESNA is governed by a 14-member Board of Directors. The president is Roger O. Smith, PhD, OT, FAOTA, RESNA Fellow

== Sister organizations ==
- Association for the Advancement of Assistive Technology in Europe (AAATE)
- Australian Rehabilitation and Assistive Technology Association (ARATA)
- Rehabilitation Engineering Society of Japan (RESJA)
- Portuguese Society of Rehabilitation Engineering and Accessibility (SUPERA)
