= Sue Hill =

British healthcare scientist

Dame Susan Lesley Hill DBE

Chief Scientific Officer for England
- Incumbent
- Assumed office October 2002
- Preceded by: Barry McClelland

Personal details
- Born: April 14, 1955 (age 71)
- Education: University of Birmingham
- Occupation: Healthcare scientist
- Profession: Respiratory scientist
- Known for: Chief Scientific Officer for England
- Awards: Dame Commander of the Order of the British Empire (2018); Officer of the Order of the British Empire (2005)

Dame Susan Lesley Hill DBE (born 14 April 1955) has been the Chief Scientific Officer for England since October 2002.

== Professional and academic background ==
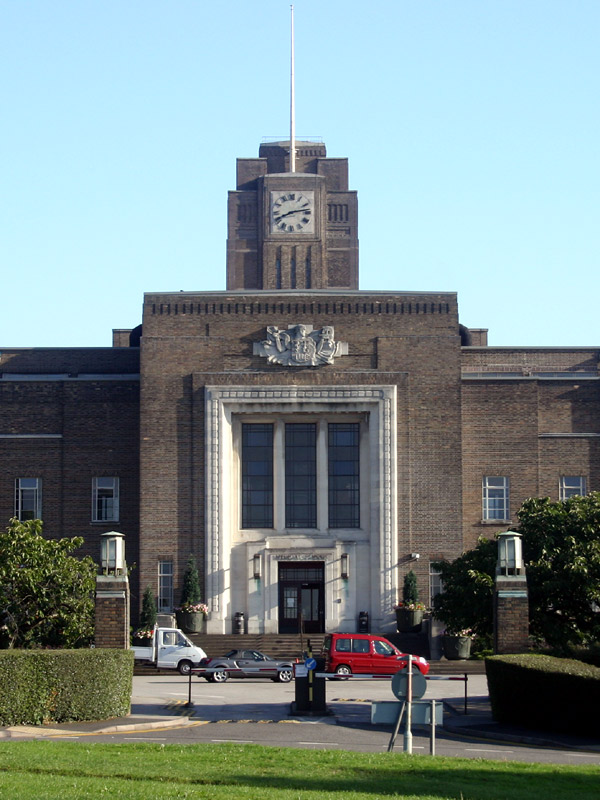
University of Birmingham Medical School

Hill's professional background is as a healthcare scientist in the National Health Service (NHS) specialising in respiratory medicine. She gained a PhD degree in Respiratory Sciences having undertaken a programme of basic science research into the pathogenesis of chronic lung disease at the University of Birmingham. She spent three decades at what is now University Hospital Birmingham NHS Foundation Trust and as an academic at the University of Birmingham Medical School. She has a personal Chair in Respiratory Medicine at the University of Birmingham.

After earning her doctorate in pulmonary pathophysiology, she was active in basic and translational research and clinical trials, working with collaborators in the US and Europe, and trained a variety of medical and scientific staff while still providing direct care for patients.

== Work within the respiratory community ==
Hill is Vice-President of the British Lung Foundation having had a long association with the charity since its formation in the early 1980s.

She also established the major international conference for chronic obstructive pulmonary disease, the biennial COPD conference series, with Professor Robert Stockley of Birmingham University. The two are directors of the conference, which was held in June 2012 in Birmingham.

== Department of Health ==
Hill first started work on initiatives for the Department of Health in the 1990s and led the development of the UK National Occupational Standards for healthcare science. She was appointed to the role of Chief Scientific Officer for England in 2002.

In addition to her role as Chief Scientific Officer, Hill is also Joint National Clinical Director for Respiratory Disease at the Department of Health, leading the DH work to improve respiratory care in the NHS.

== NHS England ==
Hill was appointed as the first Chief Scientific Officer for NHS England in February 2013, with the role transferring from the Department of Health following the NHS reforms of 2012. Her role involves providing leadership to the healthcare science profession and expert clinical advice across the entire English health system as well as working with senior clinical leaders both within the NHS England and the broader health commissioning system. She is Senior Responsible Officer (SRO) for Genomics at NHS England and also SRO for the Home Oxygen Programme

== Honours ==
She was appointed an OBE in the 2005 Queen's Birthday Honours. She is also an honorary fellow of the Royal College of Physicians. She was subsequently made a Dame Commander of the same order in the 2018 Queen's Birthday Honours "[f]or services to the 100,000 Genome Project and to NHS Genomic Medicine". She was elected a Fellow of the Academy of Medical Sciences in 2019.

In 2019, Professor Hill was conferred an honorary Doctor of Science degree by the University of Staffordshire for her leadership of the scientific workforce within the NHS, her establishment of the CSO WISE Fellowship programme, and her leadership of the 100 000 Genome Project. She was also awarded an honorary doctorate from the University of Surrey in 2019.
