= Modernising Scientific Careers =

Modernising Scientific Careers (MSC) is a UK-wide government initiative to address the training and education needs of the whole healthcare science workforce in the National Health Service (NHS). The initiative won a Healthcare Innovation Award in 2013. Its stated aims are to introduce flexibility, sustainability and modern career pathways for the healthcare science workforce to meet future needs of the NHS.

== Background and history ==
Modernising Scientific Careers is a joint initiative of the four health departments of the UK led by the Chief Scientific Officer at the Department of Health, Professor Sue Hill OBE. It is analogous to the Modernising Medical Careers scheme for doctor training.

The genesis of MSC came from a series of stakeholder consultation events in early 2008 and the June 2008 report "A High Quality Workforce", part of the Darzi Review of the NHS.

This led to the publication of a policy consultation document at the end of 2008, which outlined a revised training structure for the 50,000 plus healthcare scientists in the NHS, providing a single coherent framework for all the healthcare science disciplines.

The final policy proposals were published in February 2010 in the document "Modernising Scientific Careers: The UK Way Forward".

== Key elements ==
There are four main elements to Modernising Scientific careers:

- introduction of a new simplified healthcare science career pathway at all stages of the career framework
- new training and education programmes, incorporating both academic and workplace-based training.

This includes qualifications and awards and arrangements for assessment of previous 'equivalent' education and skills.

- identification of regulatory implications for changing education and training
- supporting delivery of the changes. This includes improving communication strategies, workforce planning, and education commissioning together with ensuring sustainable funding arrangements

== Career stages ==
The new MSC career pathway has four stages:

- Assistants and Associates
- Practitioner Training Programme (PTP) – Bachelor-level education
- Scientist Training Programme (STP) – Masters-level education
- Higher Specialist Scientific Training (HSST) – Doctoral level

== Implementation in devolved administrations ==
Scotland The Health Directorate of the Scottish Government has agreed to participate in the UK-wide framework for healthcare science education and training, while retaining the best of current Scottish practice. NHS Education for Scotland is leading on the work for Scotland and is participating on the UK-wide Healthcare Science Education and Training Board arrangements.

== Award ==
The Modernising Scientific Careers programme won the Workforce Innovation category in the 2013 Guardian Healthcare Awards where it was praised for its leadership in involving patients and staff, professions and academic institutions.

== See also ==
- National School of Healthcare Science
- Academy for Healthcare Science (United Kingdom)
