= National School of Healthcare Science =

The National School of Healthcare Science is part of the infrastructure for Healthcare Science education and training within the NHS in England, established through the Modernising Scientific Careers programme. It is a hosted function of Health Education England (HEE) and is based at HEE's West Midlands offices in Birmingham.

== Responsibilities ==
The role of the NSHCS is to:

- Recruitment of trainees to the masters-level Scientist Training Programme
- provide support the NHS Healthcare science trainees through their courses, ensuring they enjoy high standards of education and training, clear and fair assessment of their work and appropriate professional recognition of their competency at the end of their course
- supporting the departments and staff providing training
- ongoing quality assurance of training courses and overseeing a national system of assessment
- providing co-ordination and advice across healthcare science working with the professional, NHS and government bodies throughout the UK to ensure a clear, common and consistent approach to healthcare science training
