= Gerhard W. Menzel =

German writer

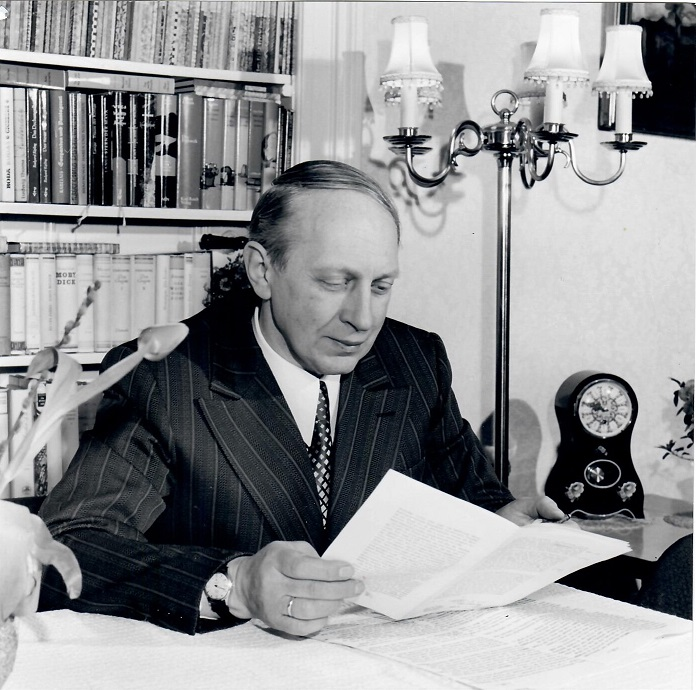

Gerhard W. Menzel (18 February 1922 – 14 March 1980) was a German writer.

== Youth ==
Born in Schkeuditz near Leipzig, Menzel was the first son of tram driver Walter Menzel and his wife Frieda, née Dietrich. Through his father, who was active in the SPD, he came into contact with the Reichsarbeitsgemeinschaft der Kinderfreunde and the Socialist Youth of Germany – Falcons at an early age. One month after Hitler's rise to power, his father lost his job, was reprimanded as a Rädelsführer and had to do forced labour until 1945. His mother died in 1935. The gifted boy, the best pupil in his town, wanted nothing more than to attend secondary school and study; unrealisable under these circumstances. He completed an apprenticeship as a bookseller at the Deutsche Buchhändler Lehranstalt in Leipzig, after which he was drafted into the Reichsarbeitsdienst. There, the eighteen-year-old fell seriously ill with tuberculosis and had to live, with short interruptions, in sanatoriums until 1947. During this time, he studied classical world literature, studied German philosophy from Kant to Nietzsche and began his own artistic experiments. He wrote poems, epic poetry and plays. During periods of relative health, he graduated from the Mediacampus Frankfurt and worked as a manufacturer at Verlag B.G. Teubner.

== Early work ==
In 1948, Menzel attempted to obtain the Abitur in the first Propädeutikum at the University of Leipzig in order to then study Germanistics. He had to abandon the renewed attempt to study at university because in the same year he began working as a radio playwright at Mitteldeutscher Rundfunk, Sender Leipzig. This meant working as a dramaturge during the day, accompanying radio play recordings in the evening and working on his own texts at night.

The earliest artistic works Menzel professed were the more than 25 radio plays he produced during that period. They were often adaptations of great works of world literature such as The Government Inspector after Nikolai Gogol (first broadcast in 1949), The Weavers after Gerhart Hauptmann (first broadcast in 1949), B. Brecht's Señora Carrar's Rifles (first broadcast: 1949), The Good Soldier Švejk after Jaroslav Hašek (first broadcast 1950), The Postmaster after Alexander Pushkin (first broadcast 1951). But he also wrote original radio plays such as The Glory of France about Frédéric Joliot-Curie, first broadcast in 1950, and The Flight of the young Schiller, first broadcast in 1956. At that time, Menzel acquired a lasting reputation as the "father of radio drama in the GDR".

In May 1952, his play Marek im Westen, a Schwejkiade, was premiered at the Kammerspiele des Deutschen Theaters, directed by Wolfgang Langhoff. With 77 performances throughout the theatres of the GDR, it was considered the most successful post-war play and its author the new talent on the theatre scene.

Politically, a rough wind was blowing in the GDR in the early 1950s. Menzel's play very soon no longer fit into the political landscape because it was characterised by deep Pacifism and in the GDR the Kasernierte Volkspolizei was founded in preparation for the Nationale Volksarmee. Thus the text was changed more and more from performance to performance, i.e. censored. Menzel finally withdrew the performance rights in 1954.

In the meantime, Menzel had become chief dramaturge of the radio drama department of the Mitteldeutscher Rundfunk, but he retired from the station in 1952 for health and political reasons. On the one hand, his old tuberculosis broke out again, and on the other hand, he was appalled at how strongly radio had become ideologised. For this reason, Menzel later successfully resisted years of attempts to recruit him to set up the entertainment department of the GDR television in Berlin.

Menzel worked on an opera in 1952/53 with the composer Paul Dessau. It took up the Faustian theme and was called Jan und Marie.

== Reorientation of work ==
Economically, a difficult time began for the family, during which Menzel initially published small epic works in anthologies such as Urania Universum and began to concentrate entirely on prose. For him, his interest in drama had always been linked to technical and theatrical realisation. In prose, Menzel was still searching for his subject and his niche, because he could not and did not want to comply with the cultural-political ideas and desires of the time for contemporary material that was, as far as possible, set in production. He made his love for the artists of the past literarily productive and devoted himself to the historical novel genre of historical-biographical stories and novels.

However, Menzel found a very strict teacher in the field of great prose in the literary editor of the Leipzig Paul List publishing house, Walter Franke. Menzel had already written the fifth version of his story "Wermut sind die letzten Tropfen" about Heinrich Heine's journey to Germany in 1843, but the publishing houses still did not want to publish it. Then the author, who was already used to success, took heart and sent the manuscript to Thomas Mann in Switzerland in 1956. Wermut sind die letzten Tropfen was published at the beginning of 1958. Menzel later became friend for many years with the illustrator Hanns Georgi, the last late Impressionist living in the GDR. The book had nine editions and was translated into Polish in 1965 and into Lithuanian in 1970.

Menzel was a slow but very thorough writer. His work stood on broad foundations, he conducted correspondences with archives, libraries and publishers all over Europe in order to gain as much knowledge as possible about contemporary sources. For he was not allowed to travel to see the sources himself; on the contrary, he had to assure the publishers that he would not apply for travel. The basis of his writing was the most precise knowledge of the works of the artists and their contemporaries. So it is not surprising that in each case he succeeded in finding out much that was new about the artists and their times, like a scientist. In the case of Wermut sind die letzten Tropfen, he found several letters by Heinrich Heine that were still unknown.

The novel Ein Stern weicht nicht aus seiner Bahn about Schiller's youthful years at the Karlsschule until his flight to Mannheim and to Thüringische Bauerbach was published in 1962. Menzel wanted to counter the Nazis' strong appropriation of Schiller with a new image of the poet. He firmly believed that Germans could find the examples and role models for upright action and democratic life among themselves and in their own history - this is what he wanted to show.

Menzel's two children's bookss were written for the first reading age. The cheerful story Der Clown Pallawatsch, was originally a self-illustrated Christmas present for his daughter Dagmar. First published in 1960, a whole generation of children has taken the clown with the tiny violin to their hearts. Der weiße Delphin, the poetic story of a boy's friendship with a dolphin, was published by Kinderbuchverlag Berlin in 1967.

After more than ten years of study, the art monograph about Pieter Brueghel the Elder was published in 1966 by the Leipzig art book publisher E. A. Seemann. Menzel succeeded for the first time in showing the painter Bruegel as an artist who took a stand in the Fight of the Dutch against Spanish foreign rule with his pictures. He was able to prove that Pieter Bruegel must have crossed the Alps to see the paintings of the painting stars of his time in the original. He found out that Bruegel had worked in a tapestry manufactory and who his teachers were. He was able to date the large panel paintings beyond doubt and shed light on many unknown circumstances of Bruegel's life. Most important for Bruegel research, however, was the realisation that the famous cycle of monthly pictures must have originally consisted of six pictures and what the lost picture looked like. These surprising results in Menzel's first work in art history earned him the respect of the experts, especially as the book was very soon also published in Switzerland and Poland.

Gerhard Keil, the then publisher of Seemann Verlag, suggested to Menzel that the material for the extensive preparatory work should also be used for a novel about Pieter Bruegel the Elder. This historical novel, Pieter the Droll, was published by Paul List Verlag in 1969.

The Troupe of Molière, a novel about the bold comedy poet, actor, director and principal in Louis XIV France, has a similarly long genesis. Since the 1950s, Menzel had been preoccupied with the relationship between artist and society through this exemplary case. The novel was published in 1975 and is probably Menzel's most artistically mature work. Just as he had learned Dutch while working on the Bruegel material in order to be able to read sources and secondary literature without doubt, he and his wife learned French together while working on the Molière material.

In 1978, the art monograph on Johannes Vermeer was published. The Verlag E.A. Seemann reissuied this volume of plates in 2008 on the occasion of its 150th anniversary in a series of the most beautiful books. Until then, almost nothing was known about the painter Vermeer, there were hardly any biographical details and the dating of the works seemed arbitrary. Numerous forgeries were attributed to the slim work. Menzel's great care and broad source work also led to completely new insights for Vermeer. Menzel found out where Vermeer had received his training, with which of his painter contemporaries he was connected and in what way, was able to erase forgeries from the registers of works, work out a dating of the works and find out essentials about the circumstances of Vermeer's life and times. Menzel also came to exciting conclusions about the iconography, especially of the late work, and about the painting style and its effect.

In 1977, the responsible authorities decided to incorporate the semi-state-owned Paul List Verlag into the Mitteldeutscher Verlag in Halle as its Leipzig branch. From 1978 onwards, Menzel's novels were published by Mitteldeutscher Verlag Halle-Leipzig.

From 1976 until his death in 1980 in Leipzig at the age of 58, Menzel worked on a collection of stories with the working title Den Federkiel in den Wind gehalten. German Experiences. The cycle remained a fragment. In letters and notes left behind, the author comments on his intentions. The process of developing responsible citizens and self-determined individuals between the 16th and 18th centuries seemed to him to have been particularly difficult in Germany compared to other European countries and to have required the greatest personal commitment. Menzel wanted to trace this and was therefore interested in Christian Reuter, Lessing, Herder, Novalis and Georg Forster. For Menzel, the lives of these writers, who differed greatly in their style and writing, had something in common: he found it in the intellectual courage with which they stood up to their environment and wanted to change it for the better. Menzel understood their often desperate search for truth and reality as a pledge of hope, which is still necessary today for a meaningful shaping of society. The stories about Herder and Forster are missing from the planned cycle. The Lessing narrative Wolfenbütteler Jahre was published separately by Mitteldeutscher Verlag in 1980. The parts of the cycle that Menzel completed, namely the stories about Christian Reuter, Gotthold Ephraim Lessing, Novalis and Georg Forster, are formally very sophisticated. In 1985, Menzel's daughter Dagmar Winklhofer added an epilogue to them and published them under the title Lessing and Others.

For Menzel, writing historical fiction was above all about accuracy, caution and modesty towards the historical figures and their work. This makes it understandable why one finds less of fictionality in his narrative work than in other authors of historical novels. In this way, Menzel consciously withdrew him and his work from all pretensions of quick updating.

== Honours ==
Gerhard W. Menzel was honoured with the Kunstpreis der Stadt Leipzig for Literature in 1967 and accepted the Lion Feuchtwanger Preis der Akademie der Künste in 1979.

== Biographies ==
- Marek im Westen, Henschelverlag 1952
- Wermut sind die letzten Tropfen, Paul List 1958, 1959, 1960, 1961, 1962, 1963, 1968, 1972
- Wermut sind die letzten Tropfen, Mitteldeutscher Verlag Halle – Leipzig 1982
- Wermut sind die letzten Tropfen, Translation into Polish, Warsaw 1968
- Wermut sind die letzten Tropfen, Translation into Lithuanian, Vilnius 1979
- Ein Stern weicht nicht aus seiner Bahn, Paul List Leipzig 1962, 1964, 1967, 1975
- Ein Stern weicht nicht aus seiner Bahn, Mitteldeutscher Verlag Halle – Leipzig 1978, 1979, 1980
- Pieter der Drollige, Paul List Verlag Leipzig 1969, 1970, 1971, 1973, 1977
- Pieter der Drollige, Mitteldeutscher Verlag Halle-Leipzig 1979
- Pieter der Drollige, Translation into Romanian, Bucarest 1974
- Pieter der Drollige, Translation into Czech, Prague 1987
- Die Truppe des Moliere, Paul List Leipzig 1975, 1976
- Die Truppe des Moliere, Mitteldeutscher Verlag Halle – Leipzig 1978, 1979
- Die Truppe des Moliere, Translation into Czech, Prague 1979
- Wolfenbütteler Jahre, Mitteldeutscher Verlag Halle – Leipzig 1980, 1981
- Lessing und andere, Mitteldeutscher Verlag Halle – Leipzig 1985
- Der Clown Pallawatsch, Der Kinderbuchverlag Berlin, 1960, 1961, 1962, 1963, 1964, 1965, 1970, 1972, 1973, 1983
- Der weiße Delphin, Der Kinderbuchverlag Berlin 1967, 1969, 1970, 1972
- Pieter Bruegel der Ältere, E. A. Seemann Verlag Leipzig 1966, 1968
- Pieter Bruegel der Ältere, Stauffacher Verlag Zürich 1970
- Pieter Bruegel der Ältere, Translation into Polish, Warsaw 1969
- Vermeer, E. A. Seemann Verlag Leipzig 1977

== Contributions to anthologies ==
- Urania Universum, Urania Verlag Leipzig Jena 1956, 1957, 1958, 1959.
- Almanach auf das Jahr 1959, Paul List, Leipzig 1959
- Die Waage, Paul List, Leipzig 1965
- Hier und Heute, Paul List, 1974
- Parallelen, Paul List, 1979
