= Brigitte Struzyk =

German writer

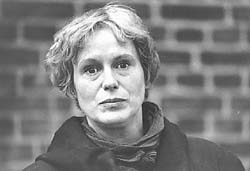
Image of Brigitte Struzyk

Brigitte Struzyk (born April 2, 1946, in Steinbach-Hallenberg, Thuringia as Brigitte Kraft) is a German writer.

== Life ==
Brigitte Struzyk is a daughter of the musicologist Günther Kraft. She grew up in Weimar, graduated from high school there in 1964 and then trained as an agricultural technician. She then worked as a trainee at the Zwickau Municipal Theatre. From 1965 to 1969, she studied theater studies at the Theaterhochschule "Hans Otto" in Leipzig. After obtaining her diploma there, she worked as a dramaturge and assistant director at the Gerhart-Hauptmann-Theater in Görlitz and Zittau. From 1970 to 1982, she was an editor at Aufbau-Verlag, initially in Weimar and from 1976 in East Berlin, where she lived in the Prenzlauer Berg district and formed the Gruppe 46 with female author friends of the same birth cohort, which existed until 1979. Brigitte Struzyk was a freelance writer from 1982 to 1990. After the Wende, she was responsible for public relations as a personal Referentin in the building department of the Berlin district Pankow from 1990 to 1998. She has been a freelance writer again since 1998.

Brigitte Struzyk, who has been a member of the PEN Center Germany since 1991, received the Lion Feuchtwanger Prize in 1991, an Honorary Gift of the German Schiller Foundation in 1992, 2001 a scholarship from the Internationales Künstlerhaus Villa Concordia, 2003 a scholarship from the Künstlerhaus Edenkoben. In 2004 she was Stadtschreiberin zu Rheinsberg.

== Works ==
- 1978: Poesiealbum Brigitte Struzyk, Berlin
- 1984: Leben auf der Kippe, Berlin et al.
- 1988: Blindband, Berlin
- 1988: Caroline unterm Freiheitsbaum, Berlin et al.
- 1989: Der wild gewordene Tag, Berlin et al.
- 1994: In vollen Zügen, Berlin et al.
- 1995: Rittersporn. Poems. With Katharina Kranichfeld (etchings). Edition Mariannenpresse, Berlin 1995. ISBN 3-922510-83-3.
- 2001: Zugzwang, Bamberg
- 2011: Das backsteinfressende Moos, Berlin
- 2011: alles offen, Hamburg
- 2012: Drachen über der Leninallee, Hamburg
- 2019: was immer, Schöneiche bei Berlin

=== As editor ===
- 1973: Frank Wedekind: Greife wacker nach der Sünde, Berlin u. a. (edited together with Antonie Günther)
- 1975: Smoking braucht man nicht, Berlin a. o. (edited together with Antonie Günther)
- 1978: F. C. Weiskopf: Das Eilkamel. Reiseberichte, Berlin et al.
- 1988: Friedrich Wolf: Auf wieviel Pferden ich geritten ..., Berlin et al. (edited together with Emmi Wolf)
- 1991: Elke Erb: Nachts, halb zwei, zu Hause, Leipzig
- 1997: Was über dich erzählt wird, Berlin (edited together with Richard Pietraß)
- 2013: Fremde Heimat, Texte aus dem Exil, Berlin (edited together with Christa Schuenke)

=== Translations ===
- 2003: Maruša Krese: Yorkshire-Tasche, Klagenfurt u. a.
- 2010: Sergei Yesenin: Anna Snegina, Moscow a. a. (zwölfsprachige Auflage)
