= Lion Feuchtwanger Prize =

German literary award

The Lion Feuchtwanger Prize is a German literary prize for historical prose. It is awarded by the Academy of Arts, Berlin on 7 July, the anniversary of his birthday. It was endowed by Marta Feuchtwanger, the widow of Lion Feuchtwanger. It was awarded annually between 1971 and 1992. Subsequently, it has been awarded less regularly. The prize is worth €7,500 to the winner, whose identity is determined by a jury of three members.

== Past winners ==
- 1971: Hans Lorbeer
- 1972: Franz Fühmann
- 1973: Hedda Zinner
- 1974: Christa Johannsen
- 1975: Heinz Kamnitzer
- 1976: Rosemarie Schuder
- 1977: (none)
- 1978: Waldtraut Lewin
- 1979: Gerhard W. Menzel
- 1980: Jan Koplowitz
- 1981: Günter de Bruyn
- 1982: Heinz Bergschicker
- 1983: Gerhard Scheibner
- 1984: Kurt David
- 1985: Volker Ebersbach
- 1986: Heinz Knobloch
- 1987: Sigrid Damm
- 1988: Eckart Krumbholz
- 1989: Walter Beltz
- 1990: Horst Drescher
- 1991: Brigitte Struzyk
- 1992: Peter Härtling
- 1998: Eckart Kleßmann
- 2000: Michael Kleeberg
- 2002: Robert Menasse
- 2004: Edgar Hilsenrath
- 2009: Reinhard Jirgl
- 2024: Dieter Langewiesche
