= Waldtraut Lewin =

German author and stage director (1937–2017)

Waldtraut Lewin (8 January 1937 – 20 May 2017) was a German writer, dramaturge and stage director.

== Life ==
Waldtraut Lewin was born in Wernigerode, a small town on the northeastern flank of the Harz Mountains, roughly equidistant between Hanover and Leipzig. Her mother was a singer. On leaving school she enrolled at the Humboldt University of Berlin where till 1961 she studied Germanistics, Latin and Theatre studies.

She worked between 1961 and 1973 as a music-dramaturge and stage director at the Regional Theatre (as it was then known) in Halle, in a team that also included Horst-Tanu Margraf and Rudolf Heinrich. Her daughter Miriam Margraf, subsequently notable in her own right as an author and music critic, was born during this period in 1964. Another achievement during the time she worked in Halle involved the translation of the libretti of sixteen Handel operas from Italian. She was awarded the city's Handel Prize in 1970. Lewin moved in 1973 to the Rostock People's Theatre, taking a position as an opera producer and chief dramaturge for music theatre. Between 1977 and 1979 she wrote the libretto for Rosa Laub, East Germany's first rock opera, which had its premier at Rostock, although by this time Lewin was no longer among the theatre's permanent staff, having turned freelance in 1977.

She published her first novel in 1973. "Herr Lucius und sein Schwarzer Schwan" is, like many of her subsequent books, an historical novel. Her next book, also an historical novel, was Die Ärztin von Lakros, and appeared in 1977. The focus of her professional career was as a freelance author after 1977. Her own website, consulted shortly after her death, stated that she had published around 70 titles, including twelve written jointly with her daughter. There were several biographies, notably of George Frideric Handel and of Julius Caesar. As her writing career progressed she increasingly specialised in works for younger adults and teenagers. There were also radio plays, libretti, and screen plays. Her published translations took in works previously accessible in French, Russian or Italian.

Waldtraut Lewin died in May 2017 in Berlin. She had celebrated her 80th birthday "still in good health, in Israel" a few months earlier.

During the closing days of the East German dictatorship officers of the Ministry for State Security (Stasi) took frantic steps to destroy the records that the ministry had accumulated during the previous forty years. Angry protesters took steps to prevent the destruction of the records, which were believed to evidence forty years of domestic espionage by a principal East German government agency devoted to controlling and monitoring people in the name of "security". The Stasi were diligent in their record keeping: there were a lot of files. Many survived. It is not known how many were destroyed. The Stasi files are preserved by the Stasi Records Agency, headquartered in Berlin, accessible to scholars, journalists and others interested. Search of the Stasi archives disclosed that Between 1975 and November 1988 Waldtraut Lewin was one of several hundred thousand Stasi informers. The code name by which she is identified in Stasi files is "IM Wald". A sympathetic commentator observes dryly in an obituary piece that Waldtraut Lewin would undoubtedly have been able to come up with a better code name for herself, had she been invited to do so. The same commentator quotes another sympathetic source insisting that it abundantly is clear from the thick Stasi files on Waldtraut Lewin that no one suffered damage because of her reports on them. Nevertheless, a number of major publishers stopped publishing her works after receiving reports of her Stasi connections.

== Personal ==
Both Waldtraut Lewin's children, Miriam Margraf and Niklas Lewin, are writers.

== Awards and honours (selection) ==
- 1978 Lion Feuchtwanger Prize by the Academy of Arts, Berlin (East Germany)
- 1981 East German children's radio play prize (Listeners' prize, 3rd place)
- 1981 East German children's radio play prize (Critics' prize)
- 1984 East German children's radio play prize (Listeners' prize, 2nd place)
- 1988 East German children's radio play prize (Listeners' prize, 2nd place)
- 1988 National Prize of the German Democratic Republic for literature, 2nd class
- 1989 East German children's radio play prize (Critics' prize)
- 2000 Bad Harzburg Youth Literature prize

== Output (selection) ==
- Herr Lucius und sein schwarzer Schwan (1973)
- Die Ärztin von Lakros (1977)
- Katakomben und Erdbeeren (1977)
- Die stillen Römer (1979)
- Gaius Julius Caesar (1980)
- Viktoria von jenseits des Zauns. Drei Märchen um die Liebe (1981). Als E-Book 2011, EditionDigital ISBN 978-3-86394-196-3
- Der Sohn des Adlers, des Müllmanns und der häßlichsten Frau der Welt (1981). Als E-Book 2011, EditionDigital ISBN 978-3-86394-314-1
- Garten fremder Herren. 10 Tage Sizilien (1982)
- Vom Eulchen und der Dunkelheit (1982)
- Kuckucksrufe und Ohrfeigen (1983)
- Federico (1984), bei Freese: ISBN 3-88942-004-4
- Georg Friedrich Händel (with Hannah M. Margraf, 1984)
- Waterloo liegt in Belgien (1985)
- Villa im Regen. Impressionen aus der Toscana (1986), ISBN 3-355-00138-4
- Addio, Bradamante. 3 Geschichten aus Italien (1986), ISBN 3-358-00752-9
- Märchen von den Hügeln (1986), ISBN 3-358-00630-1
- Poros und Mahamaya. Eine Geschichte aus dem alten Indien (1987), ISBN 3-358-00950-5
- Die Zaubermenagerie (1988)
- Liebeswettstreit (1989)
- Ein Kerl, Lompin genannt (1989)
- Reisen in Italien (1989)
- Dicke Frau auf Balkon (1994)
- Alter Hund auf drei Beinen (1995)
- Alles für Caesar (1996)
- Jochanaan in der Zisterne (1996)
- Hunde in der Stadt (1996)
- Die Frauen von Kolchis (1996)
- Jenseits des Meeres: die Freiheit (1997)
- Frau Quade sprengt die Bank (1997)
- Kleiner Fisch frisst großen Fisch (1997)
- Insel der Hoffnung (1998)
- Frau Quades Welt bricht zusammen (1998)
- Luise, Hinterhof Nord (Ein Haus in Berlin 1890) (1999)
- Paulas Katze (Ein Haus in Berlin 1935) (1999)
- Mauersegler (Ein Haus in Berlin 1989) (1999)
- Tochter der Lüfte (2000)
- Der Fluch (2000)
- Die aus der Steppe kommen (2002)
- Mond über Marrakesch (2003)
- Weiberwirtschaft (2004)
- Goethe (2004), E-Book: Verlagsgruppe Random House, ISBN 978-3-641-01167-3
- Marek und Maria (2004)
- Wenn die Nacht am tiefsten (2005)
- Männersache (2005)
- Samoa (2005)
- Die Maske des Wolfes
- Die letzte Rose des Sommers (2005)
- Columbus (2006), E-Book: Verlagsgruppe Random House, ISBN 978-3-641-01461-2
- Wiedersehen in Berlin (2006)
- Artussagen (2007)
- Drei Zeichen sind ein Wort (2007)
- Drei Zeichen sind die Wahrheit. 2008. ISBN 978-3-570-13079-7, E-Book: Verlagsgruppe Random House, ISBN 978-3-641-01430-8
- Griechische Sagen. Ausgewählt und neu erzählt, Verlag Loewe, Bindlach 2008, ISBN 978-3-7855-6202-4
- Leonie Lasker, Jüdin. Teil 1: Die drei Zeichen, Verlag cbj, München 2010, ISBN 978-3-570-40003-6
- Leonie Lasker, Jüdin. Teil 2: Dunkle Schatten, Verlag cbj, München 2010, ISBN 978-3-570-40004-3
- Leonie Lasker, Jüdin. Teil 3: Welt in Flammen, Verlag cbj, München 2010, ISBN 978-3-570-40020-3
- Die Jüdin von Konstantinopel. Roman, Knaur-Taschenbuch-Verlag, München 2010, ISBN 978-3-426-50430-7
- Valadas versinkende Gärten. Roman, Deutscher Taschenbuchverlag, München 2012, ISBN 978-3-423-21344-8
- Leo Baeck. Geschichte eines deutschen Juden. Eine Romanbiografie, Gütersloher Verlagshaus, Gütersloh 2012, ISBN 978-3-579-06563-2
- Der Wind trägt die Worte. Buch 1. Von der Zeit der Legenden bis zum Ausgang des Mittelalters, Verlag cbj, München 2012, ISBN 978-3-570-13482-5
- Römische Sagen. Ausgewählt und neu erzählt, Verlag Loewe, Bindlach 2013, ISBN 978-3-7855-6353-3
- Der Wind trägt die Worte. Buch 2. Von der Neuzeit bis in die Gegenwart, Verlag cbj, München 2013, ISBN 978-3-570-13483-2
- Nenn mich nicht bei meinem Namen, Ein Mädchen an Bord der Exodus, Verlag cbj, München 2014, ISBN 978-3-570-40228-3
- Feuer. Der Luther-Roman, Gütersloher Verlagshaus, Gütersloh 2014, ISBN 978-3-579-06587-8
- Das Beiderwandkleid. Roman, 175er Verlag, Hartha 2015, ISBN 978-3-932429-09-5
- Wenn du jetzt bei mir wärst. Eine Annäherung an Anne Frank, cbj, München 2015, ISBN 978-3-570-17108-0
