= Rosemarie Schuder =

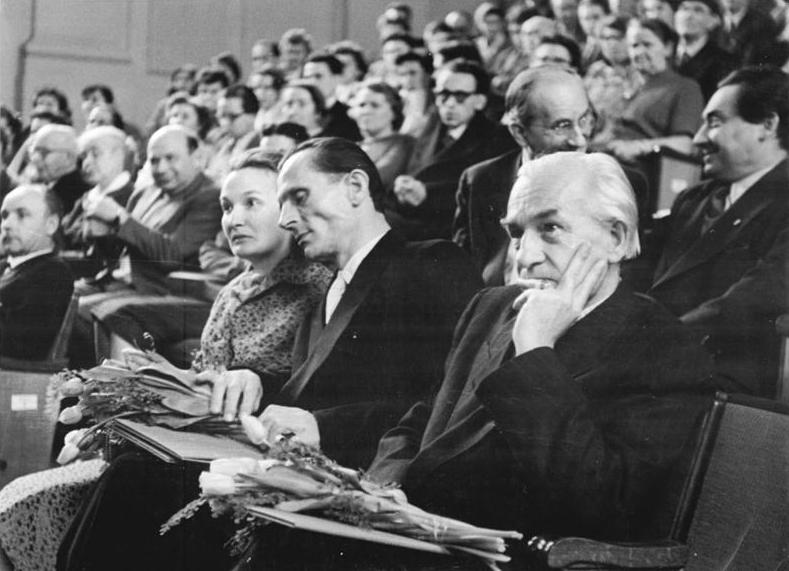
Rosemarie Schuder in 1958, third person from the right

Rosemarie Schuder (married Rosemarie Hirsch; July 24, 1928 – May 5, 2018) was a German writer.

== Life ==
Rosemarie Schuder came from a middle-class family in Jena. She attended a girls' school and took the Abitur in 1947. Subsequently she worked as a freelance journalist for the East German newspaper Tägliche Rundschau and Neue Zeit. She interned for hands on experience at the Jena Glassworks in 1952. From 1957 to 1959, she underwent a study abroad in Italy. Since 1958, she has been married to writer Rudolf Hirsch and lives as a freelance writer in Berlin.

Schuder was the writer of numerous historical novels in which she dealt with primarily themes from German history like the Münster Rebellion of 1534 or the fate of important people like Paracelsus, Johannes Kepler and Michelangelo.

Schuder belonged to the P.E.N.-Zentrum of East Germany since 1978 being a member of the PEN-Zentrums Deutschland as well as the Deutsche Schillergesellschaft. Since 1951 she belonged to the Ost-CDU ending with her withdrawal from the party in March 1990. She received the 1958 Heinrich Mann Prize, the National Prize of East Germany in each 1969, 1978 and 1988, the 1976 Lion Feuchtwanger Prize as well as the 1988 Goethe Prize of the City of Berlin.

She died in May 2018 in Berlin.

== Works ==
- Glas (Glass), Leipzig 1952
- Die Strumpfwirker (The Dull Worker), Berlin 1953
- Ich hab's gewagt (I Have Dared It), Berlin 1954
- Der Ketzer von Naumburg (The Heretic of Naumburg), Berlin 1955
- Meine Sichel ist scharf (My Sickle is Sharp), Berlin 1955
- Paracelsus, Berlin 1955
- Der Sohn der Hexe (The Witch's Son), Berlin 1957
- In der Mühle des Teufels (In the Devil's Grinder), Berlin 1959
- Der Tag von Rocca di Campo (The Day of Rocca di Campo), Berlin 1959
- Die Störche von Langenbach (The Storks of Langenbach), Berlin 1961
- Der Gefesselte (The Bound), Berlin 1962
- Die zerschlagene Madonna (The Smashed Madonna), Berlin 1964
- Tartuffe 63 oder Die Ehe der Michaela Schlieker (Tartuffe 63 of the Marriage of Michaela Schlieker), Berlin 1965
- Die Erleuchteten oder Das Bild des armen Lazarus zu Münster in Westfalen, von wenig Furchtsamen auch der Terror der Liebe genannt (The Illustration or Image of the poor Lazarus of Münster in Westphalia, of important Timidness also called the Terror of Love), Berlin 1968
- Paracelsus und der Garten der Lüste (Paracelsus and the Garden of Lusts), Berlin 1972
- Agrippa und das Schiff der Zufriedenen (Agrippa and the Ship of the Content), Berlin 1977
- Serveto vor Pilatus (Serveto in front of Pilatus), Berlin 1982
- Der gelbe Fleck (The Yellow Spot), Berlin 1987 (together with Rudolf Hirsch)
- Die Bilder der Königin (The Picture of the Queen), Berlin 1990
- Welt und Traum des Hieronymus Bosch (World and Dreams of Hieronymus Bosch), Berlin 1991
- Botticelli, Berlin 1996
- Nummer 58866 – Judenkönig (Number 58866 – Jewish King), Berlin 1996 (together with Rudolf Hirsch)
- Hochverrat oder Seltsame Wege zu Ferdinand Freiligrath (High Treason or Strange Ways of Ferdinand Freiligrath), Zürich 2001
- Deutsches Stiefmutterland (German Step-Mother Land), Teetz 2003
- Der "Fremdling aus dem Osten" / Eduard Lasker – Jude, Liberaler, Gegenspieler Bismarcks (The "Stranger from the East" / Eduard Lasker – Jew, Liberal, Bismarck's Opponent), Berlin: Verlag für Berlin-Brandenburg 2008

== Publishing work ==
- Otto Nuschke, Berlin 1953
- Hieronymus Bosch: Hieronymus Bosch, Berlin 1975
