= History of trams in Leipzig =

Leipziger Verkehrsbetriebe GmbH (LVB, 'Leipzig Transport Company, LLC') operates one of Germany's largest tramway networks. The tramway network history is presented below in tabular form, including opening, electrification, and closing dates by segment. Street names of the time are used in the tables, with current names in (parentheses).

== Network development ==
=== Leipziger Pferde-Eisenbahn-Gesellschaft (LPE, 'Leipzig Horse Railway Company') ===
On 20 April 1871, the Leipzig local authority granted to Count ("Graf") Gabriel Diodati and Geneva banker Adolph Schaeck a concession for construction of horse tramway lines. Construction was started in February 1872. On 24 May 1872, six days following the opening of the initial segment, the company, its property and concession was taken over by the Leipzig Tramways Company Ltd., organized in London by the British engineer Hutton Vignoles. The undertaking continued to use the LPE title in the German Empire. The LPE was taken over on 1 January 1896 by the Großen Leipziger Straßenbahn (GLSt, "Greater Leipzig Tramway") undertaking.

==== The first phase of construction (1872–1873) ====
Date	Type of Change	Segment
18 May 1872	Opened	Zentrumsring: Roßplatz – Augustusplatz – Georgiring – Bahnhöfe (Hauptbahnhof) – Blücherplatz (Tröndlinring/Kurt-Schumacher-Straße) – Fleischerplatz (Tröndlin-/Goerdelerring) – Obstmarkt (Martin-Luther-Ring) – Königsplatz (Wilhelm-Leuschner-Platz) – Roßplatz
	Opened	Augustusplatz, Mittelfahrbahn – Johannisplatz – Dresdner Straße – de:Reudnitz, Depot
	Opened	Königsplatz – Peterssteinweg – Südplatz – Kochstraße – de:Connewitz, Kreuz – Connewitz, Eiskeller (Nähe Koburger Brücke)
4 June 1872	Opened	Obstmarkt – Weststraße (Fr.-Ebert-Straße, the road alignment at that time was in Höhe Rudolfstraße, parallel to Karl-Tauchnitz-Straße in the Ring) – Plagwitzer Straße (Karl-Heine-Straße) – de:Plagwitz, "Felsenkeller"
22 September 1872	Opened	"Felsenkeller" – Zschochersche Straße – Plagwitz, "Drei Linden" (Zschochersche/Dreilindenstraße)
1 December 1872	Changed to service track	Augustusplatz – Bahnhöfe – Schulplatz – Obstmarkt/Weststraße
19 December 1872	Reopened	Augustusplatz – Bahnhöfe – Blücherplatz
	Opened	Blücherplatz – Blücherstraße (Kurt-Schumacher-Straße) – Chausseehaus (Delitzscher/Georg-Schumann-Straße) – Eutritzsch, Markt – Gräfestraße – Eutritzsch, Gasthof "Zum Helm"
20 January 1873	Opened	Yorckplatz (W.-Liebknecht-Platz) – Gohliser Straße – Menckestraße – Möckernsche Straße – de:Gohlis, "Weintraube" (Möckernsche Str. 5)

==== The second phase of construction (1881–1891) ====
After the new transport system had worked satisfactorily and enjoyed increasing popularity with Leipzig citizens, the company planned extensions to link surrounding districts of Leipzig with the tramway network.

Date	Type of Change	Segment
1881	Opened	Südplatz – Connewitzer Chaussee (K.-Liebknecht-Straße) – Connewitz, Kreuz
	Closed	Südplatz – Kochstraße – Connewitz, Kreuz
24 December 1881	Opened	Frankfurter/Leibnizstraße (Jahnallee/Leibnizstraße) – Waldplatz – Angerbrücke – Kuhturmstraße (>) / Dreilindenstraße (<) - Lindenauer Markt - Odermannstraße - Lützner Straße - Endersstraße - Guts-Muths-Straße (>) / Merseburger Straße (<) - Plagwitz, Depot (Nähe König-Albrecht-Brücke)
1 April 1882	Opened	Brühl/Katharinenstraße - Schulplatz - Frankfurter/Leibnizstraße
18 June 1882	Opened	Augustusplatz, Mittelfahrbahn - Goethestraße - Brühl – Brühl/Katharinenstraße
22 July 1882	Opened	Plagwitz, "Felsenkeller" – Albertstraße (Karl-Heine-Straße) – Plagwitz, Depot
	Changed to service track	Plagwitz, "Felsenkeller" – Plagwitz, "Drei Linden"
22 August 1882	Opened	Bahnhöfe – Goethestraße/Brühl
	Opened	Augustusplatz/Goethestraße – Schillerstraße – Peterstor (Schiller-/Petersstraße)
24 October 1882	New alignment	Change at Augustusplatz, Mittelfahrbahn terminal from four to two tracks
22 December 1882	Opened	Georgiring/Wintergartenstraße – Wintergartenstraße – Eisenbahn-/Kirchstraße (Eisenbahn-/H.-Liebmann-Straße)
25 July 1883	Opened	Gohlis, "Weintraube" – Möckernsche Straße – Gohlis, Depot (Möckernsche Straße 37/41)
	Opened	Peterstor – Königsplatz
7 September 1883	Opened	Roßplatz – Kurprinzstraße (Grünewaldstraße) – Windmühlenstraße – Bayrischer Bahnhof
18 May 1884	Opened	Johannisplatz – Ostplatz
22 June 1884	Opened	Obstmarkt/Harkortstraße – Harkortstraße – Spießbrücke (Harkort-/Telemannstraße)
13 July 1884	Opened	Spießbrücke – Pestalozzistraße (Telemannstraße) – Festplatz Scheibenholz
18 July 1884	Reopened	Centralhalle Dittrichring (Schauspielhaus) – Obstmarkt/Weststraße
1 August 1884	Changed to service track	Spießbrücke – Festplatz (Operated only for special events (Veranstaltungen, "meetings"))
16 September 1884	Reopened	Fleischerplatz (Tröndlin-/Goerdelerring) – Centralhalle Dittrichring
1885	Reopened	Blücherplatz – Fleischerplatz
?? Dec 1885	Opened	Ostplatz – Mühlstraße – Thonberg, Cecilienstraße
1886	Opened	Eutritzsch, Gasthof "Zum Helm" – Gräfestraße – Eutritzsch, Depot
14 May 1887	Opened	Eisenbahn-/Kirchstraße – Eisenbahnstraße – Torgauer Platz
1887	Opened	Reudnitz, Depot – Breite/Engelsdorfer Straße (Breite/Zweinaundorfer Straße)
19 August 1888	Opened	Breite/Engelsdorfer Straße – Anger-Crottendorf, "Albertgarten" (Zweinaundorfer/Herbartstraße)
28 October 1889	Opened	Wiesenstraße (G.-Mahler-Straße) – Promenadenstraße (K.-Kollwitz-Straße, at that time the road ran straight to the Wiesenstraße) – Fleischerplatz
	Opened	Bayrischer Bahnhof – Bayrische Straße (A.-Hoffmann-Straße) – Kantstraße – Schlachthof (MDR-Zentrum)
	Opened	Spießbrücke – Kaiser-Wilhelm-Straße (A.-Bebel-Straße) – Kaiser-Wilhelm-/Kronprinzstraße (A.-Bebel-/K.-Eisner-Straße)
5 May 1890	Opened	Fleischerplatz – Pfaffendorfer Straße – Nordplatz
	New alignment	Straight-line route via the Nordplatz in the course of the Michaelis- und Gohliser Straße on this day by the existing bypass
8 September 1890	Opened	Thonberg, Hospital-/Mühlstraße (Prager/Mühlstraße) – Reitzenhainer Straße (Prager Straße) – Friedhofsweg
	Changed to service track	Segment in the Mühlstraße
13 June 1891	Opened	Chausseehaus – Hallische Straße (G.-Schumann-Straße) – Möckern, Kernstraße

=== Leipziger Elektrische Straßenbahn (LESt, 'Leipzig Electric Tramway Company') ===
The second tramway undertaking in Leipzig, the LESt, was founded on 3 April 1893 and entered into the municipal Trade Register (Handelsregister) on 7 May 1895. The electrical-equipment manufacturer AEG served as the principal financial backer of the new undertaking. Because LESt cars were painted red, the company was known colloquially as the Rote ("Red One"). The competing tramway enterprise (LPE, from 1896 the GLSt) operated blue cars, and was known as the Blaue ("Blue One"). The concession for construction and operation of electric tramways was granted to LESt on 28 February 1895. Construction began after a short planning period on 11 June 1895. Because of the regulation limiting the length of each LESt segment in the same road as competing lines to just 400 meters, the company built a substantial length of lines in parallel roads and unreasonable workings in nearby side streets, which remain today

==== Development of the Concession Network (1896–1898) ====
Date	Type of Change	Segment
20 May 1896	Opened	Mockau, Kirche – Berliner Straße – Nordstraße (>) / Gerberstraße (<) - Katharinenstrasse (>) / Reichsstraße (<) - Neumarkt - Königsplatz (Ostseite) - Brüderstraße
	Opened	de:Schönefeld, Löbauer Straße - Volbedingstraße - Berliner/Volbedingstraße
2 June 1896	Opened	Brüderstraße - Nürnberger Straße – Bayrischer Bahnhof
3 June 1896	Opened	Königsplatz (Ostseite) – Wächterstraße – Grassistraße – Beethovenstraße – Marschnerstraße – S.-Bach-Straße – Klingerbrücke – Könneritzstraße – de:Schleußig, Oeserstraße
5 June 1896	Opened	Gohlis, Platnerstraße – Rosental – Waldplatz – Elsterstraße – Zentralstraße – Thomaskirche – Markt – Augustusplatz (north side, beyond the entrance to the opera house) – Poststraße (road no longer exists) – Querstraße – Schützenstraße – Karlstraße (Chopinstraße) – Marienplatz
22 June 1896	Opened	Schleußig, Oeserstraße – Antonienstraße – "Adler" – Hauptstraße (Dieskaustraße) – Großzschocher, Huttenstraße
30 October 1896	Opened	Quer-/Poststraße – Johannisplatz – Nürnberger Straße – Nürnberger/Brüderstraße
	Opened	Bayrischer Bahnhof – Albertstraße (Riemannstraße) – Mozartstraße – Grassi-/Beethovenstraße
5 August 1897	Opened	Albert-/Elisenstraße (Riemann-/B.-Göring-Straße) – Elisenstraße – Elisen-/Arndtstraße
20 October 1897	Opened	Marienplatz – Ranftsche Gasse – Kohlgartenstraße – Bergstraße – Kirchplatz (Berg-/H.-Liebmann-Straße) (temporary triangular junction (Gleisdreieck) built here)
14 November 1897?	Opened	Kirchplatz – Kirchstraße (H.-Liebmann-Straße) – Schönefelder Brücke (Südrampe) (possibly opened on 10 January 1898)
8 December 1897	Opened	Johannisplatz – Täubchenweg – Riebeckstraße – Stötteritzer Straße – de:Stötteritz, Hofer Straße/Stadtgrenze
21 December 1897	Opened	Lindenthaler/Hallische Straße (G.-Schumann-/Lindenthaler Straße) – Eisenacher Straße (>) / Wahrener Straße (Wolfener Straße) (<) - Gohlis, Platnerstraße
15 May 1898	Opened	Stötteritz, Stadtgrenze - Wasserturmstraße - Weißestraße - Arnoldstraße - Holzhäuser Straße - Stötteritz, Depot (current terminal)
23 July 1898	Opened	Kirchplatz – Kirchstraße (H.-Liebmann-Straße) – Wurzner Straße – Wurzner/Plaußiger Straße
20 August 1898	Opened	Stannebeinplatz – Schönefeld, Löbauer Straße
	Opened	Berliner/Apelstraße – Wittenberger/Heinickestraße
30 August 1898	Opened	Bayrischer Bahnhof – Windmühlenweg (Ph.-Rosenthal-Straße) – Johannisallee – Ostplatz – Oststraße (>) / Stötteritzer Straße (<) - Riebeckstraße
	Opened	Stötteritzer/Schönbachstraße - Schönbach-/Reitzenhainer Straße (Schönbach-/Prager Straße)
1898	Opened	Wittenberger/Heinickestraße - Eutritzsch, Markt - Delitzscher Straße/Alte Dübener Landstraße
14 November 1898	Opened	Gohlis, Kasernen (Landsberger/Olbrichtstraße) – Landsberger Straße – Lindenthaler/Hallische Straße

==== Short extensions (1899–1917) ====
After the backbone network of the LESt was developed, the company built only shorter extensions at various extremities and the town center. Issues related to the struggle between competing tramway enterprises proved burdensome to the local authority, and so merger of the companies was sought during the First World War. This was accomplished from 1 January 1917, when the LESt was absorbed by its larger competitor, the GLSt.

Date	Type of Change	Segment
19 November 1899	Opened	Gohlis, Stockstraße – Eisenacher Straße – Möckernsche Straße – Kirschbergstraße – Möckern, Gasthof "Zum Anker" (Hotel "Zum Anker", continues in business)
10 September 1900	Opened	Elisen-/Arndtstraße – Elisenstraße (B.-Göring-Straße) – Elisen-/Scharnhorststraße
12 June 1902	Opened	Riebeck-/Stötteritzer Straße – Riebeckstraße – Arbeitsanstalt (Riebeck-/Prager Straße)
14 July 1904	Opened	Elisen-/Scharnhorststraße – Elisen-/Hardenbergstraße
21 October 1905	Opened	Wurzner/Plaußiger Straße – Paunsdorf, Stadtgrenze (at the east wall of the Sellerhausen cemetery)
15 December 1906	Opened	Elisen-/Hardenbergstraße – Elisenstraße – Waisenhausstraße (A.-Nitzsche-Straße) – Connewitz, Kreuz
10 March 1910	Opened	gemeinsam mit der GLSt: Wendescheife Bahnhöfe/Richard-Wagner-Straße (southernmost of four loop tracks owned by LESt)
30 September 1910	Opened	Gohlis, Depot (today's Landsberger Straße terminal) – Landsberger Straße – Gohlis, Kasernen (provisional opening as service track)
10 November 1912	Opened	Waisenhausstraße – Zwenkauer Straße – Depot Connewitz/Hildebrandstraße
1 March 1913	Opened	Windmühlenweg/Johannisallee – Windmühlenweg (Ph.-Rosenthal-Straße) – Siegismundstraße (terminal loop, at approximate site of today's Deutscher Platz loop)
1 May 1913	Opened	Quer-/Schützenstraße – Hahnekamm – Brandenburger Straße – Richard-Wagner-Straße / Hauptbahnhof
1 June 1913	Opened	Paunsdorf, Stadtgrenze – Paunsdorf, Depot (provisional opening as service track)
16 July 1913	Opened	Reitzenhainer/Schönbachstraße – Reitzenhainer Straße (Prager Straße) – Südfriedhof (Covered terminal at the south side of the Reitzenhainer Straße)
17 February 1914	Opened	Schleife Siegismundstraße (Deutscher Platz) – Reitzenhainer Straße – Naunhofer Straße (Terminal in the Naunhofer Straße)
31 October 1914	Opened	Eutritzsch, Delitzscher Straße/Dübener Landstraße – Krankenhaus St. Georg (current terminal)
18 August 1916	New alignment	reserved track alongside the road between the Waldstraßenbrücke bridge and the Polizeiwache (police station, approximately at today's Höhe Tennisplatz)

=== Große Leipziger Straßenbahn (GLSt, 'Greater Leipzig Tramway Company') ===
The course of events prompted the LPE to convert its network to electric traction. For this purpose, on 15 November 1895 the Große Leipziger Straßenbahn AG was entered into the municipal Trade Register. Effective 1 January 1896, the LPE, together with its contracts with the electrical manufacturer Union-Elektricitäts-Gesellschaft (UEG) and the banking house of Becker & Co, was handed to GLSt.

==== Electrification (1896–1897) ====
Because the competing enterprise was already busy with construction of an extensive electric tramway network, electrification of the horse tramway lines had to be advanced hastily. Within 18 months, the entire horse traction network had been changed to overhead electric traction.

Date	Type of Change	Segment
18 April 1896	Electrified	Gohlis, Depot Möckernsche Straße – Nordplatz – Bahnhöfe – Goethestraße – Schillerstraße – Königsplatz (W.-Leuschner-Platz) – Connewitzer Chaussee (K.-Liebknecht-Straße) – Connewitz, Kreuz – Connewitz, Eiskeller (near Koburger Brücke)
30 October 1896	Electrified	Plagwitz, Depot – Lindenauer Markt – Waldplatz – Blücherplatz – Georgiring – Augustusplatz – Roßplatz – Bayrischer Bahnhof – Prager Straße – Friedhofsweg
	Electrified	Fleischerplatz – Brühl – Brühl/Goethestraße
31 October 1896	Electrified	Plagwitz, Depot – "Felsenkeller" – Obstmarkt – Königsplatz – Roßplatz
	Electrified	Georgiring/Wintergartenstraße – Eisenbahnstraße – Torgauer Platz
	Opened	Plagwitzer Bahnhöfe – Albertstraße (K.-Heine-Straße) – Plagwitz, Depot
2 March 1897	Electrified	Augustusplatz, Mittelfahrbahn – Reudnitz – Anger-Crottendorf, "Albertgarten"
3 March 1897	Electrified	Nordplatz – Fleischerplatz – Obstmarkt – Spießbrücke – Kaiser-Wilhelm-/Kronprinzstraße (A.-Bebel-/K.-Eisner-Straße)
4 March 1897	Electrified	Blücherplatz – Chausseehaus – Möckern, Kernstraße
5 March 1897	Electrified	Wiesen-/Promenadenstraße (G.-Mahler-/K.-Kollwitz-Straße) – Promenadenstraße – Fleischerplatz
	Electrified	Bayrischer Bahnhof – Bayrische Straße (A.-Hoffmann-Straße) – Schlachthof
17 April 1897	Electrified	Chausseehaus – Eutritzsch, Markt – Eutritzsch, Depot Gräfestraße
9 May 1897	Electrified/ Reopened	Spießbrücke – Rennbahn
28 October 1897	Electrified/ Reopened	Plagwitz, "Drei Linden" – "Felsenkeller"

==== Extensive development of the network (1897–1902) ====
The company also built new lines, because many districts were not yet served by the Leipzig tramway network.

Date	Type of Change	Segment
28 October 1897	Opened	"Felsenkeller" – Zschochersche Straße – "Adler" – Windorfer Straße – Kleinzschocher, Taborkirche
13 November 1897	Opened	Albert-/Nonnenstraße (K.-Heine-/Nonnenstraße) – Nonnenstraße – Weißenfelser Straße – Weißenfelser/Zschochersche Straße
Ende 1897	Opened	Lützner-/Endersstraße – Lützner Straße – Lindenau, Depot (today: Bushof Lindenau) (provisional opening as service track)
1 June 1898	Opened	Reitzenhainer Straße/Friedhofsweg (Prager Straße/Friedhofsweg) – Friedhofsweg – Südfriedhof (at the tobacco mill (Tabaksmühle))
24 July 1898	Opened	Reudnitz, Depot – Wurzner Straße – Torgauer Straße – Torgauer Platz
26 October 1898	Opened	Kaiser-Wilhelm-/Kronprinzstraße (A.-Bebel-/K.-Eisner-Straße) – Kronprinz-/Südstraße (K.-Eisner-/K.-Liebknecht-Straße)
	Opened	Connewitz, Kreuz – Bornaische/Meusdorfer Straße
1898	Opened	Gohlis, Depot Möckernsche Straße – Wiederitzscher Straße – Wiederitzscher/Hallische Straße
	Opened	Nordplatz – Roscherstraße – Roscher-/Eutritzscher Straße (Betriebsstrecke)
27 January 1899	Opened	Lindenauer Markt – Querstraße – G.-Schwarz-Straße – Leutzsch, Schule
14 April 1899	Opened	Leutzsch, Schule – Rathenaustraße – Bahnhof Leutzsch
23 July 1899	Opened	Möckern, Kernstraße – Hallische Straße – Möckern, Kirche
30 November 1899	Opened	Hallische/Meusdorfer Straße – Lößnig, Hallische/Siegfriedstraße
6 December 1899	Opened	Lößnig, Siegfriedstraße – Hallische Straße – de:Dölitz, Leinestraße
1900	Opened	Dölitz, Leinestraße – Dölitz, Depot (provisional opening as service track)
20 December 1900	Opened	Reitzenhainer Straße/Friedhofsweg – Reitzenhainer Straße (Prager Straße) – Probstheida, Depot (today: Bushof Probstheida) (segment between Probstheida, Gasthof (Prager/Russenstraße) and Depot used only as service track)
	Regular operation on former service track	Lützner/Endersstraße – Lindenau, Depot
14 October 1901	Opened	Waldplatz – Westplatz
22 November 1901	Changed to service track	Spießbrücke – Rennbahn (operated only during track and field events)
9 June 1902	Opened	Schiller-/Universitätsstraße – Roßplatz
	Opened	Bayrische/Kronprinzstraße (A.-Hoffmann-/K.-Eisner-Straße) – Kronprinz-/Südstraße (K.-Eisner-/K.-Liebknecht-Straße)

==== The end of network expansion (1908–1917) ====
After the GLSt completed its planned network, it began to build terminal loops at important terminals where space was available (Bahnhof Leutzsch, Richard-Wagner-Straße (shared with LESt), Eutritzsch/Markt, Völkerschlachtdenkmal/Gletschersteinallee, Connewitz/Klemmstraße, Ludwig-/Bussestraße (Tauchaer Tor), Tabaksmühle). Some short extensions at extremities were also built. In spite of the war, regular service to Depot Dölitz was started on 19 June 1915.

Date	Type of Change	Segment
5 October 1911	Opened	Gohliser/Menckestraße – Lützowstraße – Gohlis-Nord, Virchow-/Gottschallstraße
1 November 1913	Opened	Lindenau, Depot – Lützner Straße – Plautstraße – Lindenau, Plaut-/Demmeringstraße
13 January 1914	Opened	Torgauer Platz – Eisenbahnstraße – Eisenbahn-/Portitzer Straße (four-track shunting facility built here)
9 July 1914	Opened	Kaiser-Wilhelm-/Kronprinzstraße – Kaiser-Wilhelm-/Kaiserin-Augusta-Straße (A.-Bebel-/R.-Lehmann-Straße)
1 January 1915	Opened	Kaiser-Wilhelm-/Kaiserin-Augusta-Straße – Brand-/Simildenstraße (Depot Connewitz/Brandstraße including service track in the Simildenstraße)

==== Network rationalization (1917–1923) ====
After the merger, the GLSt began to simplify its route network. Many now-redundant parallel segments were closed, however, short new segments were opened in order to connect the two systems more effectively.

Date	Type of Change	Segment
7 February 1917	Changed to service track	Enders-/Lützner Straße – Guts-Muths-Straße (>) / Merseburger Straße (<) - Albertstraße
31 March 1917	Changed to service track	Kronprinz-/Bayrische Straße (K.-Eisner-/A.-Hoffmann-Straße) - Kronprinz-/Südstraße (K.-Eisner-/K.-Liebknecht-Straße)
1 April 1917	Closed	Schiller-/Universitätsstraße – Roßplatz
	Changed to service track	Kaiser-Wilhelm-/Kronprinzstraße (A.-Bebel-/K.-Eisner-Straße) – Brandstraße
20 September 1917	New alignment	between Polizeiwache (police station, approximately at today's Höhe Tennisplatz) and the Gohliser Wehrbrücke bridge, on reserved track along the Waldstraße
19 November 1917	Changed to service track	Berliner/Apelstraße – Eutritzscher Markt
	Closed	Elisen-/Waisenhausstraße (B.-Göring-/A.-Nitzsche-Straße) – Connewitz, Kreuz
	Changed to service track	Albert-/Elisenstraße (Riemann-/B.-Göring-Straße) – Elisenstraße – Waisenhausstraße – Zwenkauer Straße – Connewitz, Depot Hildebrandstraße
	Changed to service track	Eutritzsch, Markt – Eutritzsch, Depot Gräfestraße
2 January 1918	Regular operation on former service track	Paunsdorf, Stadtgrenze – Paunsdorf, Depot
	Closed	Gohlis, Stock-/Eisenacher Straße – Eisenacher Straße – Kirschbergstraße – Möckern, Gasthof "Zum Anker"
10 January 1918	Changed to service track	Gohlis, Tauchaer Weg (M.-Liebermann-Straße) – Gohlis, Kasernen
11 May 1918	Closed	"Adler" – Windorfer Straße – Kleinzschocher, Taborkirche
1918	Opened	Wendeschleife Stötteritz, Papiermühlstraße (Häuserblockumfahrung)
	Closed	Stötteritzer/Schönbachstraße – Schönbach-/Reitzenhainer Straße (Schönbach-/Prager Straße)
1 October 1919	Changed to service track	Wurzner/Torgauer Straße – Torgauer Platz
	Closed	Augustusplatz, Nordseite – Poststraße – Post-/Querstraße
um 1920	Opened	Eisenbahn-/Annenstraße – Wurzner/Annenstraße
1 April 1920	Closed	Königsplatz/Ostseite – Brüderstraße – Nürnberger/Brüderstraße
10 June 1920	Closed	Kirchplatz (H.-Liebmann-/Bergstraße) – Bergstraße – Kohlgartenstraße – Marienplatz – Schützenstraße – Schützen-/Querstraße
	Changed to service track	Kirch-/Eisenbahnstraße – Kirchstraße (H.-Liebmann-Straße) – Kirch-/Wurzner Straße
	Changed to service track	Hauptbahnhof – Brandenburger Straße – Hahnenkamm – Querstraße – Johannisplatz
	Closed	Albert-/Elisenstraße – Elisenstraße – Waisenhausstraße, as well as the connecting track, away from the town center, in the Zwenkauer Straße to the depot
5 November 1922	Opened	Tauchaer/Kohlgartenstraße (Fr.-Liszt-Platz) – Kohlgartenstraße – Reudnitz, Dresdner/Kohlgartenstraße
17 December 1922	Closed	Albert-/Nonnenstraße – Nonnenstraße – Weißenfelser Straße – Weißenfelser/Zschochersche Straße
17 January 1923	Closed	Windmühlenweg/Johannisallee – Ostplatz – Stötteritzer Straße (>) / Oststraße (<) - Riebeckstraße
8 November 1923	Regular operation on former service track	Gohlis, Tauchaer Weg - Gohlis, Depot Landsberger Straße

==== Between the inflation and World War II (1924–1938) ====
After the network was rationalized to the extent necessary, the GLSt then began building new lines and additional terminal loops (Möckern/Huygensstraße, Connewitz/Kreuz, Möckern/Depot, Kleinzschocher/Depot, Wahren/Rathaus, Fortuna-Stadion, Schönefeld/Volbedingstraße, Stötteritz/Holzhäuser Straße). Up to the reorganization of the undertaking as the Leipziger Verkehrsbetriebe (LVB, 'Leipzig Transport Company'), from 29 July 1938, the last large districts were connected to the tramway network. Coincidentally, on the same day the first trolleybus line in Leipzig entered service.

Date	Type of Change	Segment
1925	Closed	Schönefeld, Volbedingstraße – Mockauer/Volbedingstraße terminal (including dismantling of the single-track segment)
26 February 1925	New alignment	Reconstruction of the Blücherplatz (Tröndlinring/K.-Schumacher-Straße)
27 August 1925	New alignment	Facilities at Richard-Wagner-Platz (old terminal removed, but double-track segment built to terminal at Hallischen Tor)
21 October 1925	Reopened	Kaiser-Wilhelm-/Kronprinzstraße (A.-Bebel-/K.-Eisner-Straße) – Brandstraße, Depot
27 March 1926	Reopened	Eutritzsch, Markt – Berliner/Apelstraße
26 June 1926	Opened	Philipp-Rosenthal-/Semmelweisstraße – de:Großmarkthalle (at the animal hospitals)
15 July 1926	Opened	Krankenhaus St. Georg – Wiederitzsch, Seehausener Straße
14 April 1927	Opened	Paunsdorf, Depot – Hans-Weigel-Straße – Engelsdorf, Kirche (reversing triangle)
15 July 1927	Opened	Torgauer Platz – Taucha, An der Bürgerruhe
11 September 1927	Opened	Möckernsche/Wiederitzscher Straße – Kirschbergstraße – Kernstraße – Kern-/Hallische Straße (used as terminal loop only in this direction)
1 March 1928	Reopened	Kirch-/Eisenbahnstraße – Kirchstraße (H.-Liebmann-Straße) – Kirch-/Wurzner Straße
1 April 1928	Opened	Dölitz, Depot – Markkleeberg-Ost, Schillerplatz
2 September 1928	Opened	Harkortstraße, Reichsverwaltungsgericht – Simsonplatz – Mozartstraße
	Closed	Grassi-/Beethovenstraße – Wächterstraße – Königsplatz (east side)
2 December 1928	Opened	"Adler" – Antonienstraße – Diezmannstraße – Schönauer Weg – Hermann-Meyer-Straße (reversing triangle)
16 December 1928	Opened	Probstheida, Depot – Meusdorf (Zwischenschleife) – Liebertwolkwitz, Störmthaler Straße (loop)
	Opened	Anger-Crottendorf, Herbartstraße – Anger-Crottendorf, Ostfriedhof (loop)
2 March 1929	Opened	Kaiserin-Augusta-/Südstraße (R.-Lehmann-/K.-Liebknecht-Straße) – Kaiserin-Augusta-Straße – Kaiserin-Augusta-/Zwickauer Straße (provisional opening only for operation during fairs)
	Opened	Bayrische/Kantstraße – Bayrische Straße (A.-Hoffmann-Straße) – Bayrische/Kaiserin-Augusta-Straße (A.-Hoffmann-/R.-Lehmann-Straße)
13 July 1929	New alignment	Reconstruction of facilities at the railway station forecourt (Hauptbahnhofsvorplatz)
4 January 1930	Opened	An der Tabaksmühle – Kaiserin-Augusta-/Zwickauer Straße (R.-Lehmann-/Zwickauer Straße)
	Regular operation on former service track	Kaiserin-Augusta-/Südstraße – Kaiserin-Augusta-/Zwickauer Straße
15 April 1931	Opened	Mockau, Kirche – Thekla (loop)
15 July 1931	Opened	Zwickauer/Kaiserin-Augusta-Straße – Behelfsholzbrücke bridge across the railway – Lößnig, Märchenwiese
4 June 1934	Opened	Großzschocher, Dieskau-/Huttenstraße – Großzschocher, G.-Ellrodt-Straße (loop)
7 April 1935	Closed	Kant-/Bayrische Straße (Kant-/A.-Hoffmann-Straße) – Schlachthof (MDR-Zentrum)
30 May 1935	Opened	Großzschocher – Knautkleeberg
15 December 1936	Opened	Yorckplatz (W.-Liebknecht-Platz) – Yorckstraße (Erich-Weinert-Straße) – Yorck-/Berliner Straße
	Changed to service track	Berliner/Yorckstraße (Berliner/Erich-Weinert-Straße) – Nordstraße (>)/Gerberstraße (<) - Katharinenstraße (>)/Reichsstraße (<) - Neumarkt - Königsplatz

=== Leipziger Außenbahn AG (LAAG 'Leipzig External Railway Corporation, Ltd.') ===
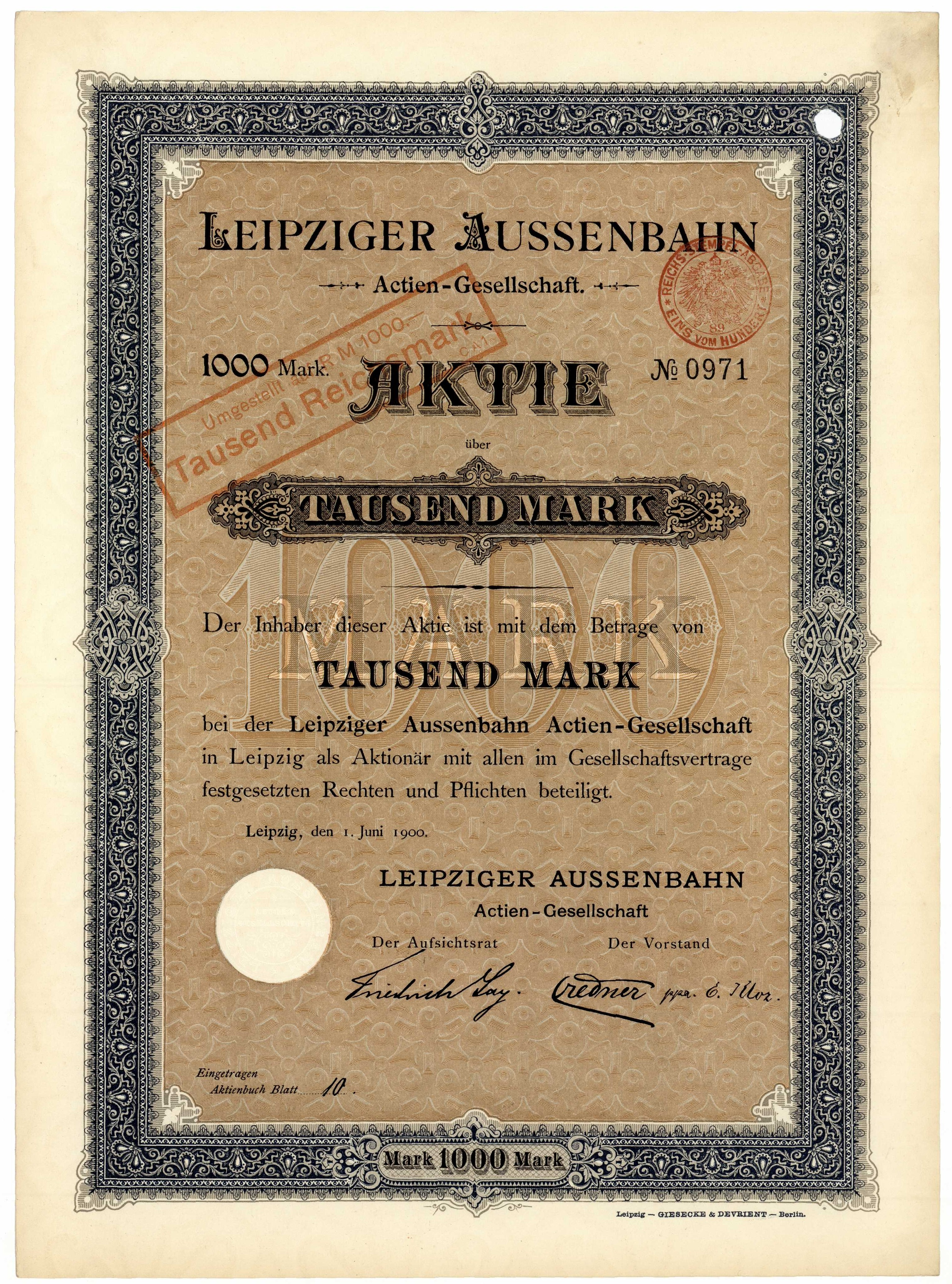
Share of the Leipziger Aussenbahn AG, issued 1. June 1900

This undertaking was organized on 6 February 1900, and planned to connect larger neighboring towns with Leipzig. The undertaking was controlled from the outset by the GLSt, but traded as an independent company. In accordance with the light railway law (Kleinbahngesetz) of Prussia, the line from the municipal boundary at Stahmeln to Schkeuditz was built and operated under a light railway concession.

The LAAG remained independent following establishment of the LVB. Only at 1 July 1946 was this undertaking merged into the LVB. The company remained the "official" owners of the tracks and other facilities until 1 October 1951. On this day, the LAAG was taken over completely by the nationalized undertaking VEB (K) Verkehrsbetriebe der Stadt Leipzig (LVB) (see below).

Date	Type of Change	Segment
21 December 1900	Opened	Möckern, Kirche – Hallische Straße – Wahren, Linkelstraße
16 May 1902	Opened	Connewitz, Eiskeller (near Koburger Brücke) – Koburger Straße – Bahnhof Markkleeberg – Ring – Markkleeberg, Gasthof "Weißer Stern" (Koburger/A.-Bebel-Straße)
9 June 1905	Opened	Wahren, Linkelstraße – Stahmeln – Lützschena, Gasthof
17 May 1907	Opened	Leutzsch, Rathaus – Gundorf (Böhlitz-Ehrenberg)
27 October 1910	Opened	Lützschena, Gasthof – Schkeuditz, Depot

=== Leipziger Verkehrsbetriebe (LVB, 'Leipzig Transport Company') ===
==== World War II and its consequences (1938–1948) ====
The trolleybus program received increased emphasis following creation of the LVB. New terminal loops were developed at "Adler" (in the Limburgerstraße and the Wachsmuthstraße), and at Torgauer/Bautzner Straße. The tramway network few extensions to the end of the war. On the contrary, some segments were destroyed during the war and were not restored thereafter. Other segments, restored briefly, had to be closed again in order to secure materials.

Date	Type of Change	Segment
9 December 1940	Regular operation on former service track	Schönefeld, Volbedingstraße – Mockauer/Volbedingstraße
1941	Closed	StrBahnhof Connewitz, Zwenkauer Straße – Zwenkauer Straße – Waisenhausstraße (tracks in direction of town center)
Summer 1942	Opened	Schönefeld, Volbedingstraße – Mockauer/Volbedingstraße (provisional opening as service track)
4 December 1943	Closed	Berliner/Yorckstraße (Berliner/Erich-Weinert-Straße) – Nordstraße (>)/Gerberstraße (<) - Blücherplatz
	Closed	Bayrischer Bahnhof - Albertstraße (Riemannstraße) - Petrikirche
27 February 1945	Closed	Kaiser-Wilhelm-/Kronprinzstraße (A.-Bebel-/K.-Eisner-Straße) - Brandstraße, Depot
1 October 1946	Changed to service track	Harkortstraße/former Reichsgericht – Simsonplatz – Mozartstraße
	Changed to service track	Marschner-/Plagwitzer Straße (Marschner-/K.-Kollwitz-Straße) – Beethovenstraße – Mozartstraße – Albertstraße – Petrikirche
End of 1946	Closed	Harkortstraße/ehem. Reichsgericht – Simsonplatz – Mozartstraße
	Closed	Marschner-/Plagwitzer Straße (Marschner-/K.-Kollwitz-Straße) – Beethovenstraße – Mozartstraße – Albertstraße – Petrikirche
4 August 1947	Changed to service track	Philipp-Rosenthal-/Semmelweisstraße – Großmarkthalle (at the animal hospitals) (only for goods traffic)
1 November 1948	Closed	Johannisplatz – Täubchenweg – Betriebshof Reudnitz

==== Restructuring and new terminal facilities (1949–1961) ====
Because of the new political situation the Leipziger Verkehrsbetriebe was also restructured. As the first step, from 22 March 1949, the LVB was integrated with the Kommunale Wirtschaftsunternehmen (KWU) Leipzig ("Local Economic Undertakings of Leipzig"). Some tramway track segments and connections were closed. On the other hand, many new reversing triangles (Knautkleeberg, Virchow-/Gottschallstraße, Großmarkthalle, Wiederitzsch, Johannisplatz, Emmausstraße, Böhlitz-Ehrenberg) and terminal loops (Markkleeberg-Mitte/Parkstraße, Märchenwiese, Plaut-/Demmeringstraße, Zentralstadion/Feuerbachstraße, Mockau/Post, Schkeuditz/Depot, Bf. Plagwitz, Markkleeberg-West) were built.

Date	Type of Change	Segment
3 January 1949	Closed	Eisenbahn-/Annenstraße – Eisenbahn-/Portitzer Straße (These facilities can be recognized in the pavement today)
1 July 1950	Closed	Eutritzsch, Markt – Gräfestraße – Eutritzsch, Depot
1 November 1950	Closed	Hauptbahnhof – Brandenburger Straße – Hahnekamm – Querstraße – Johannisplatz – Nürnberger Straße – Bayrischer Bahnhof
	Closed	Wendeschleife Torgauer/Bautzner Straße
13 April 1951	Closed	Waldplatz – Elsterstraße – Thomaskirche – Markt – Karl-Marx-Platz (Augustusplatz)
Autumn 1951	Closed	Terminal loop at Fortuna-Stadion (stadium)
End of 1951	Closed	Blücherplatz – Katharinenstraße (>)/Reichsstraße (<) - Neumarkt - Königsplatz (the connection from the R.-Wagner-Straße to the Ring remains)
1955	Closed	Harkort-/Pestalozzistraße (Harkort-/Telemannstraße) - Rennbahn
1 September 1956	New alignment	Widening and creation of reservation in the Georgiring
1 December 1958	Closed	Covered terminal at Prager Straße/Südfriedhof (so-called "Schlippe")
31 July 1959	New alignment	reserved track between the Roßplatz and the Bayrischer Bahnhof
1959	Closed	Terminal at Connewitz, Eiskeller
15 June 1960	Reopened	Lützner/Endersstraße – Guts-Muths-Straße (>)/Merseburger Straße (<) - Karl-Heine-Straße
11 February 1961	New alignment	Käthe-Kollwitz-/Elsterstraße - Westplatz (previous alignment of the K.-Kollwitz-Straße removed)
14 February 1961	Closed	Markkleeberg-West - Gasthof "Weißer Stern"
18 May 1961	Opened	Gohlis-Nord, Gottschallstraße – Gohlis-Nord, Virchowstraße (loop)
15 December 1961	Changed to service track	Lützner/Endersstraße – Guts-Muths-Straße (>)/Merseburger Straße (<) - Karl-Heine-Straße

==== Reconstruction of facilities in the town center (1964–1978) ====
Traffic growth completely overloaded facilities in and near the town center, creating an urgent need for expansion and modernization. The Tröndlinring was greatly widened and a four-track terminal facility was built at Friedrich-Engels-Platz (Goerdelerring). Various segments in other locations were modernized, but some extremities fell victim to the "red pencil" because of losses and were replaced by motorbus. From 1 January 1970, the undertaking was renamed VEB Kombinat Verkehrsbetriebe der Stadt Leipzig (LVB) ("People's Collective Enterprise 'Transport Services of Leipzig City'").

Date	Type of Change	Segment
20 June 1964	Closed	Friedrich-Engels-Platz – Brühl – Brühl/Goethestraße
	New alignment	Haltestelle Friedrich-Engels-Platz (Tracks 1 and 3)
20 August 1964	New alignment	Haltestelle Friedrich-Engels-Platz (Tracks 2 and 4)
	Opened	Friedrich-Ebert-/Moritzstraße – Karl-Tauchnitz-Straße – Neues Rathaus
	Closed	old Friedrich-Ebert-Straße between Moritzstraße and Martin-Luther-Ring
1 January 1965	Closed	Philipp-Rosenthal-/Semmelweisstraße – Großmarkthalle
30 August 1965	New alignment	reserved track Augustusplatz – Johannisplatz
1966	Closed	reserved track alongside the Friedhofsweg
11 July 1967	Reopened	Kurt-Eisner-/Arthur-Hoffmann-Straße – Kurt-Eisner-/Karl-Liebknecht-Straße
	Opened	Arthur-Hoffmann-/Richard-Lehmann-Straße – Wiedebachplatz
28 July 1967	Closed	Richard-Lehmann-/Zwickauer Straße – Zwickauer/Arno-Nitzsche-Straße (reversing triangle at R.-Lehmann-/Zwickauer Straße remains)
4 August 1967	Changed to service track	Kurt-Eisner-/Arthur-Hoffmann-Straße – Kurt-Eisner-/Karl-Liebknecht-Straße
	Opened	Wiedebachplatz – Arno-Nitzsche-/Zwickauer Straße
3 October 1967	Closed	Lützner/Endersstraße – Guts-Muths-Straße (>)/Merseburger Straße (<) - Karl-Heine-Straße
1967	New alignment	Kreuzungsbereich Richard-Wagner-Straße/Tröndlinring/Gerberstraße
25 May 1968	Closed	Augustusplatz - Schillerstraße - Wilhelm-Leuschner-Platz
15 July 1968	Closed	Diezmannstraße/Schönauer Weg – Hermann-Meyer-Straße
1 June 1969	Opened	Schleife Sellerhausen, Emmausstraße
Spring 1970	Closed	Schönefeld reversing triangle, Dimpfelstraße (north of the crossing of the Stannebeinplatz)
15 December 1970	Opened	Diezmannstraße/Schönauer Weg – Kurt-Kresse-Straße – Hermann-Meyer-Straße
28 June 1971	Closed	Meusdorf – Liebertwolkwitz
10 July 1971	Closed	Richard-Wagner-Straße west of the terminal facilities
16 July 1971	Opened	Wendeschleife Hauptbahnhof/Westseite
27 August 1971	New alignment	Friedrich-Engels-Platz – Hauptbahnhof
23 March 1972	Closed	Kurt-Eisner-/Arthur-Hoffmann-Straße – Kurt-Eisner-/Karl-Liebknecht-Straße
22 August 1973	New alignment	reserved track Antonienstraße – Diezmannstraße – Kurt-Kresse-Straße (following installation of longer gauntlets at the crossing (junction) Antonien-/Diezmannstraße, this was removed from 13 October 1979)
19 April 1974	New alignment	Hauptbahnhof/Ostknoten (Georgiring/Wintergartenstraße)
24 May 1974	New alignment	Kreuzung Hauptbahnhof/Goethestraße
12 September 1974	Closed	Schleife Messegelände/Deutscher Platz ("Siegismundschleife")
1 October 1974	Closed	Paunsdorf, Depot – Sommerfeld – Engelsdorf, Kirche
23 December 1974	Opened	Märchenwiese – Lößnig
3 November 1975	New alignment	Wilhelm-Leuschner-Platz – Roßplatz
1 November 1976	Opened	Wendeschleife Torgauer/Bautzner Straße
28 January 1978	New alignment	rebuilding of Thekla loop

==== Development of new residential areas (1979–1990) ====
From 1979 a new task awaited the transport planning staff of the LVB. Large new prefabricated housing blocks (Plattenbau) were constructed east and west of the town (esp. in Grünau), and these were to be connected to the tramway network. Following the end of the DDR, the LVB became the Leipziger Verkehrsbetriebe (LVB) AG i. A. ("Leipzig Transport Company, Ltd. (in liquidation") as the first step toward conversion from a state-owned enterprise (see Treuhand).

Date	Type of Change	Segment
5 April 1979	Opened	Hermann-Meyer-Straße – Ratzelstraße – Grünau-Süd
1 September 1980	New alignment	Koburger Brücke
29 September 1980	Opened	Deutscher Platz loop
2 September 1982	Opened	Lützner/Plautstraße – Lützner Straße – Schönauer Ring – Grünau-Nord
31 October 1983	Opened	Lützner Straße/Schönauer Ring – Lützner/Plovdiver Straße (temporary reversing triangle)
31 August 1984	New alignment	reserved track Lenin-/Schönbachstraße (Prager/Schönbachstraße) – Sandgrube
30 September 1984	Opened	Lützner/Plovdiver Straße – Miltitz
30 November 1985	Opened	Grünau-Süd – Lausen
23 August 1986	New alignment	reserved track Antonien-/Könneritzstraße – Antonienstraße/E.-Zeigner-Allee
21 May 1987	Changed to service track	Lützner/Plautstraße – Plaut-/Demmeringstraße loop
24 December 1987	Opened	Paunsdorf, Depot – Am Vorwerk (temporary stub terminal)
25 November 1988	Opened	Am Vorwerk – Ahornstraße (temporary stub terminal)
10 March 1989	Opened	Böhlitz-Ehrenberg terminal loop
17 November 1989	Opened	Ahornstraße – Paunsdorf-Nord
10 December 1989	New alignment	Roßplatz reversing triangle

==== The LVB as a modern transport service (from 1990) ====
The most important task of the new undertaking, which was converted to a company with limited liability (GmbH) from 16 March 1993, was modernization of the vehicle fleet and also some segments of tram lines. These measures have not yet been completed (at 2006). Some segments were closed because of heavy losses. From 27 May 2001, the tramway service network was rearranged, with service restored to one segment on which a previous service had been withdrawn.

Date	Type of Change	Segment
18 December 1990	New alignment	The terminal loop at Dölitz no longer extended across the depot grounds
27 May 1992	New alignment	Waldplatz crossing
2 December 1992	New alignment	Georgiring/Wintergartenstraße crossing
21 January 1993	Closed	Connewitz terminal loop, Hildebrandstraße (officially from 22 March 1993)
26 July 1993	New alignment	loop Gohlis-Nord, Virchowstraße
18 October 1993	New alignment	reserved track (or separate lanes for trams and autos) Goerdelerring – Neues Rathaus
26 January 1994	New alignment	Johannisplatz – Prager/Riebeckstraße
9 May 1994	Closed	Wodanstraße/Fregestift terminal loop
29 May 1994	Opened	Paunsdorf-Nord – Sommerfeld
6 June 1994	New alignment	Eutritzscher/Michaelisstraße reversing triangle
20 February 1995	Closed	Nordplatz – Roscherstraße – Eutritzscher/Roscherstraße
28 May 1995	New alignment	reserved track Erich-Weinert-Platz (W.-Liebknecht-Platz) – Chausseehaus
29 May 1995	Opened	Portitzer Allee – Paunsdorf-Nord
2 December 1995	New alignment	reserved track Chausseehaus – Eutritzsch, Markt
Ende 1995	New alignment	reserved track Eutritzsch, Markt – Krankenhaus St. Georg
16 March 1996	New alignment	reserved track Krankenhaus St. Georg – Dachauer Straße
12 April 1996	Opened	Wiederitzsch – Neue Messe (Messegelände, "Fairgrounds")
29 August 1997	Closed	Breite Straße – Anger-Crottendorf
	Changed to service track	Fr.-List-Platz – Kohlgartenstraße – Reudnitz, Köhlerstraße
6 May 1998	Closed	Reudnitz Depot – Täubchenweg/Breite Straße
1 August 1999	Opened	Deutsche Bücherei – Semmelweisstraße – Zwickauer Straße – Zwickauer/Arno-Nitzsche-Straße (provisional opening as service track)
9 October 1999	Closed	Neues Rathaus – Harkortstraße – August-Bebel-Straße – Kurt-Eisner-Straße – Kurt-Eisner-/Karl-Liebknecht-Straße
1 August 2000	Closed	Georg-Schumann-/Wiederitzscher Straße – Wiederitzscher Straße – Möckernsche Straße – Stock-/Möckernsche Straße
20 August 2000	Regular operation on former service track	Deutsche Bücherei – Semmelweisstraße – Zwickauer Straße – Zwickauer/Arno-Nitzsche-Straße
20 December 2000	New alignment	Berliner Brücke – Mockauer/Volbedingstraße
27 May 2001	Closed	Arthur-Hoffmann-/Richard-Lehmann-Straße – Arthur-Hoffmann-/Arno-Nitzsche-Straße
	Changed to service track	Hermann-Liebmann-/Eisenbahnstraße – Wurzner/Hermann-Liebmann-Straße
	Changed to service track	Prager/Naunhofer Straße – Richard-Lehmann-/Arthur-Hoffmann-Straße
	Changed to service track	Rathaus Leutzsch – Bahnhof Leutzsch
3 February 2003	Opened	Stannebeinplatz reversing triangle (Gleisdreieck)
	Closed	Hermann-Liebmann-/Eisenbahnstraße – Wurzner/Hermann-Liebmann-Straße
24 August 2003	Changed to service track	Schönauer Ring – Grünau-Nord
27 June 2004	New alignment	Friedrich-List-Platz – Eisenbahnstraße – Hermann-Liebmann-Straße – Stannebeinplatz
1 December 2004	New alignment	Eisenbahn-/Hermann-Liebmann-Straße – Torgauer Platz
11 April 2005	Closed	Prager/Naunhofer Straße – Richard-Lehmann-/Zwickauer Straße
16 July 2005	New alignment	Stop (boarding) facilities at Johannisplatz/Prager Straße
29 August 2005	New alignment	Stop (boarding) facilities Johannisplatz/Dresdner Straße
17 October 2005	Opened	Rabensteinplatz loop
23 December 2005	New alignment	Knoten Hauptbahnhof/Goethestraße
1 January 2006	Changed to service track	Portitzer Allee – Paunsdorf-Nord (Line 18 withdrawn)
20 February 2006	New alignment	Goerdelerring – Waldplatz – Sportforum (with underpass at the crossing (intersection) Jahnallee/Marschnerstraße)
2 April 2006	Reopened	Portitzer Allee – Paunsdorf-Nord (worked by Lines 3 and Line 3E)
28 November 2015	Closed	Connewitz, Kreuz - Markkleeberg West (Line 9 lost too many passengers since the opening of the S-Bahn Network in 2013)

==== Current tramway service network, as of January 2023 ====
1	Lausen – Grünau-Süd – Adler – Schleußig – Westplatz – Goerdelerring – Hauptbahnhof – Eisenbahnstraße – Stannebeinplatz – Schönefeld – Mockau, Post
1E	Lausen – Grünau-Süd – Adler – Schleußig – Westplatz – Goerdelerring – Hauptbahnhof – Eisenbahnstraße – Stannebeinplatz – Schönefeld, Volbedingstraße
2	Grünau-Süd – Adler – Schleußig – Westplatz – Leuschnerplatz – Bayrischer Platz – Naunhofer Straße (– Probstheida – Meusdorf)
3	Knautkleeberg – Großzschocher – Kleinzschocher – Adler – Felsenkeller – Angerbrücke – Waldplatz – Goerdelerring – Hauptbahnhof – Eisenbahnstraße – Torgauer Platz – Heiterblick – Portitzer Allee – Paunsdorf-Nord – Sommerfeld
3E	Knautkleeberg – Kleinzschocher – Adler – Felsenkeller – Angerbrücke – Waldplatz – Goerdelerring – Hauptbahnhof – Eisenbahnstraße – Torgauer Platz – Heiterblick – Portitzer Allee – Taucha, An der Bürgerruhe
4	Gohlis, Landsberger Straße – Lindenthaler Straße – Rosental – Waldplatz – Goerdelerring – Hauptbahnhof – Augustusplatz – Reudnitz – Riebeckstraße – Stötteritz, Holzhäuser Straße
4E	Goerdelerring – Hauptbahnhof – Augustusplatz – Reudnitz – Riebeck-/Stötteritzer Straße (Trams continue as Line 12 in both directions)
7	Böhlitz-Ehrenberg – Leutzsch – Angerbrücke – Waldplatz – Goerdelerring – Hauptbahnhof – Augustusplatz – Reudnitz – (Torgauer Platz) – Sellerhausen – Paunsdorf – Paunsdorf-Nord – Sommerfeld
8	Grünau-Nord – Lindenau – Angerbrücke – Waldplatz – Westplatz – Leuschnerplatz – Augustusplatz – Wintergartenstraße/Hbf. – Eisenbahnstraße – Torgauer Platz – Sellerhausen – Paunsdorf – Paunsdorf-Nord
9	Thekla – Mockau – Apelstraße – Hauptbahnhof/Westseite – Goerdelerring – Leuschnerplatz – Bayrischer Platz – Connewitz, Kreuz – Connewitz, S-Bahnhof/Klemmstraße
10	(Wahren – Möckern – Gohlis – Chausseehaus -) Hauptbahnhof – Augustusplatz – Leuschnerplatz – Connewitz – Märchenwiese – Lößnig
11	Schkeuditz – Lützschena – Wahren – Möckern – Gohlis – Chausseehaus – Hauptbahnhof – Augustusplatz – Leuschnerplatz – Connewitz – Dölitz – Markkleeberg-Ost, Schillerplatz
11E	Wahren – Möckern – Gohlis – Chausseehaus – Hauptbahnhof – Augustusplatz – Leuschnerplatz – Connewitz – Dölitz, Straßenbahnhof (- Markkleeberg-Ost, Schillerplatz)
12	Gohlis-Nord – Lützowstraße – Zoo – Goerdelerring – Hauptbahnhof – Augustusplatz – Johannisplatz (- Technisches Rathaus) (Trams continue as Line 4E)
14	S-Bf. Plagwitz- Felsenkeller - Westplatz– Goerdelerring – Hauptbahnhof - Neues Rathaus – Felsenkeller – S-Bf. Plagwitz
15	Miltitz – Grünau-Nord – Lindenau – Angerbrücke – Waldplatz – Goerdelerring – Hauptbahnhof – Augustusplatz – Prager Straße – Probstheida – Meusdorf
16	Messegelände – Wiederitzsch – Eutritzsch – Chausseehaus – Hauptbahnhof – Augustusplatz – Bayrischer Platz – Deutsche Bücherei – Märchenwiese – Lößnig
16E	Messegelände – Wiederitzsch – Eutritzsch – Chausseehaus – Hauptbahnhof – Augustusplatz – Leuschnerplatz (operates only during fairs, i.e. during various events at the Leipzig Trade Fair)
N10	Hauptbahnhof - Augustusplatz - Karl-Liebknecht-Straße - Connewitz, Kreuz - Lößnig(only on weekend nights between 1 a.m. and 4 a.m.)
N17	Lausen - Westplatz - Hauptbahnhof - Augustusplatz - Reudnitz - Paunsdorf Nord(only between 1 a.m. and 4 a.m.)

Lines 1/1E

A 10-minute service interval ("headway") is operated between Lausen and Schönefeld from Monday to Friday during daytime service hours, and a 20-minute interval to Mockau. At other times Line 1E does not operate and 15-minute intervals are operated between Lausen and Mockau. Both lines are served by NGT10 stock all day only. The primary function of these lines is to connect the densely populated Grünau-Süd, Schleußig and Schönefeld districts with the town center.

Line 2

Line 2 operates only during peak periods every 10 minutes. On weekdays the line serves the segment of Line 15 between Naunhofer Straße, which is the regular terminus, and Meusdorf as addition in an 20 minute-interval. In the late evening and the weekend morning hours, Line 2 is not operated. The line connects the residential districts of Grünau-Süd, Schleußig and Probstheida/Meusdorf to the southern town central and serve important research institutes and universities. Line 2 is, as Line 1, also served by NGT10 stock only.

Lines 3/3E

Line 3 operates daily. Line 3E operates during weekday mornings, daytime service hours, evenings and weekend daytime service hours. On Mondays through Saturdays service operates every 10 minutes (Line 3/3E in exchange), and every 15 minutes on Sundays . Low-floor NGT8 stock with low-floor trailer cars, NGT10 stock and LEOLINER trams in two-coupled formations serving both lines. Both lines are connecting residential areas (Knauthain, Großzschocher, Volkmarsdorf, Paunsdorf, Taucha) and larger industrial areas (Heiterblick) as well as the Paunsdorf-Center shopping center and the Belantis theme park (with feeder buses from Knautkleeberg) to the town center.

Line 4

On Mondays to Fridays during daytime service hours, Line 4 operates every 10 minutes, and every 15 minutes at other times. It is worked primarily by NGT10 stock. The major function of Line 4 is to connect the residential districts of Gohlis, Reudnitz and Stötteritz with the town center.

Line 7

This line operates at the same intervals as Line 4, every 10 minutes during weekday daytime hours and every 15 minutes at other times. At times when Line 8 does not operate, Line 7 operates via Torgauer Platz. Also on weekends and during late evening service hours, NGT8 stock with low-floor trailers or LEOLINER trams in two-coupled formations serve this line. Line 7 connects the densely built-up residential districts of Böhlitz-Ehrenberg, Leutzsch, Reudnitz, Sellerhausen and Paunsdorf with the town center, and in addition the large Paunsdorf-Center shopping center.

Line 8

To connect the large housing estates of Grünau-Nord and Paunsdorf as well as the districts of Lindenau und Volkmarsdorf with the southern town center, Line 8 operates during daytime service hours. On weekdays and during saturdays daytime service, NGT8 stock with low-floor trailer cars run the services every 10 to 15 minutes. On sundays, NGT8 stock serves the line only.

Line 9

Line 9 operates during weekday daytime service hours every 10 minutes, and every 15 minutes at other times. Until November 2015 it connected the housing developments of Mockau, Südvorstadt-Ost, Connewitz and Markkleeberg-West with the town center. Since then the Services of Line 9 terminate at S-Bahnhof Connewitz, the route to Markkleeberg-West was closed. In 2023, mostly NGT8 low-floor-trams serve the Line.

Line 10

Only during weekday daytime service hours do the NGT8 low-floor vehicles serve Line 10. The segment between Wahren and Hauptbahnhof does not operate on Sunday mornings. The service frequencies correspond to those provided on other lines, thus weekdays every 10 minutes, on weekends 15 minutes. The line connects the large housing estate at Lößnig as well as the districts of Connewitz, Südvorstadt, Gohlis, Möckern and Wahren with the town center.

Lines 11/11E

Line 11 is the longest line of the Leipzig tramway network. It operates through three fare zones and crosses the municipal boundary at both extremities.

During weekday daytime service hours, both lines operate every 20 minutes, with Line 11E working only to Dölitz. At other times, the two lines operate every 30 minutes and Line 11E terminates at Markkleeberg-Ost. Both lines are usually served by Bombardier Classic-XXL stock, with one NGT10 stock operating one service on sundays.

The lines connect Leipzig with the neighboring towns of Schkeuditz and Markkleeberg, and the districts of Lützschena, Wahren, Möckern, Gohlis, Südvorstadt, Connewitz and Dölitz with the Leipziger Stadtzentrum (Leipzig town center).

Lines 12/4E

The two lines, 4E and 12, operate through workings, that is, services, worked primarily by NGT8 stock, operate through and line designations are changed at terminals. Line 4E, however, operates only during daytime service hours, on weekdays only during peak periods. At noon the direction of travel changes. Thereafter, only Line 12 operates between Gohlis-Nord and Johannisplatz. Earlier services operate from Gohlis-Nord via the Prager Straße, the Riebeckstraße, and Reudnitz before returning to Gohlis-Nord. At the Prager Straße / Riebeckstraße intersection, the line number is changed. However, afternoon services operate around the "Ring" in the opposite direction. Line numbers are changed at the Goerdelerring and at the Prager Straße / Riebeckstraße intersection. On weekdays and on Saturdays, during daytime service hours, service operates at 10-minute intervals, and at 15-minute intervals at other times. The two lines connect the districts of Gohlis, Nordvorstadt, Reudnitz and Thonberg with the town center.

Line 14

This line operates every 10 minutes Monday to Saturday during daytime service hours, and every 15 minutes at other times. NGT8 stock runs the services only. The line connects the residential area of Plagwitz with the town center.

Line 15

The busiest line of the Leipzig tramway network is served during weekday daytime hours every 10 minutes, and every 15 minutes at other times. Bombardier Classic-XXL stock, each with the capacity of a three-car Tatra formation (Tatra-Großzug), entered service from 2005 / 2006. Due to lack of rolling stock in the past few years, Tatra-Großzüge with low-floor trailers also serve this line until early 2023, especially on weekdays. The line connects the large housing estates at Miltitz and Grünau-Nord, as well as the densely populated districts of Lindenau, Thonberg, Probstheida and Meusdorf with the town center. At the Moment the Line works only with the Bombardier Classic-XXL stock.

Lines 16/16E

On school days, trains of NGT10 stock operate on Line 16 at 10-minute intervals. At other times during weekday daytime service and during holiday peak periods, they operate also every 10 minutes, and every 15 minutes at other times. During events at the Leipzig Trade Fair, Bombardier Classic-XXL stock and Tatra formations are used and the interval between services is halved by operation of Line 16E between the fairground and the Leuschnerplatz. In addition to the fairground, Line 16 serves also the large housing estate at Lössnig and the districts of Wiederitzsch, Eutritzsch and Nordvorstadt.

Line 16 is the only tramway line in Leipzig which has already been upgraded in part to Stadtbahn standards.

Line N10

Line N10 is a night service which is operating since November 2015 on weekend late nights. It serves the urban districts of Lößnig and Südvorstadt and connects this areas with the town centre. The services operate in a 71-minute interval with NGT10 stock only.

Line N17

Line N17 is a night service which is operating since 1 April 2018 on all late nights during a week, which also means that Leipzig trams serve the city areas in the late night for the first time in 20 years (since 1998 usually "Nightliner-Buses" served the city areas at this time only, in most city areas they still do). The Line operates in a 71-minute interval on workdays and in a nearly 35-minute interval on weekends, it connects the areas of Grünau, Schleußig and Plagwitz with the town centre and Paunsdorf. Usually NGT10 stock serves this line only.

==== Future Prospects ====
The major project in planning at present is upgrading of Line 15 (Miltitz – Meusdorf) to Stadtbahn standards. In addition, on 20 February 2006, the underpass under the intersection of Jahnallee and Marschnerstraße was opened. Subsequent projects for modernization of other important lines (1, 3, 7, 11) are planned.

Line extensions are at present only in planning. Under study are an extension of Line 15 from Meusdorf to Pösna-Park as well as the extension of Line 16 to Seehausen. It appears at present that both will be built, but probably not in the next several years.

== Depots ==
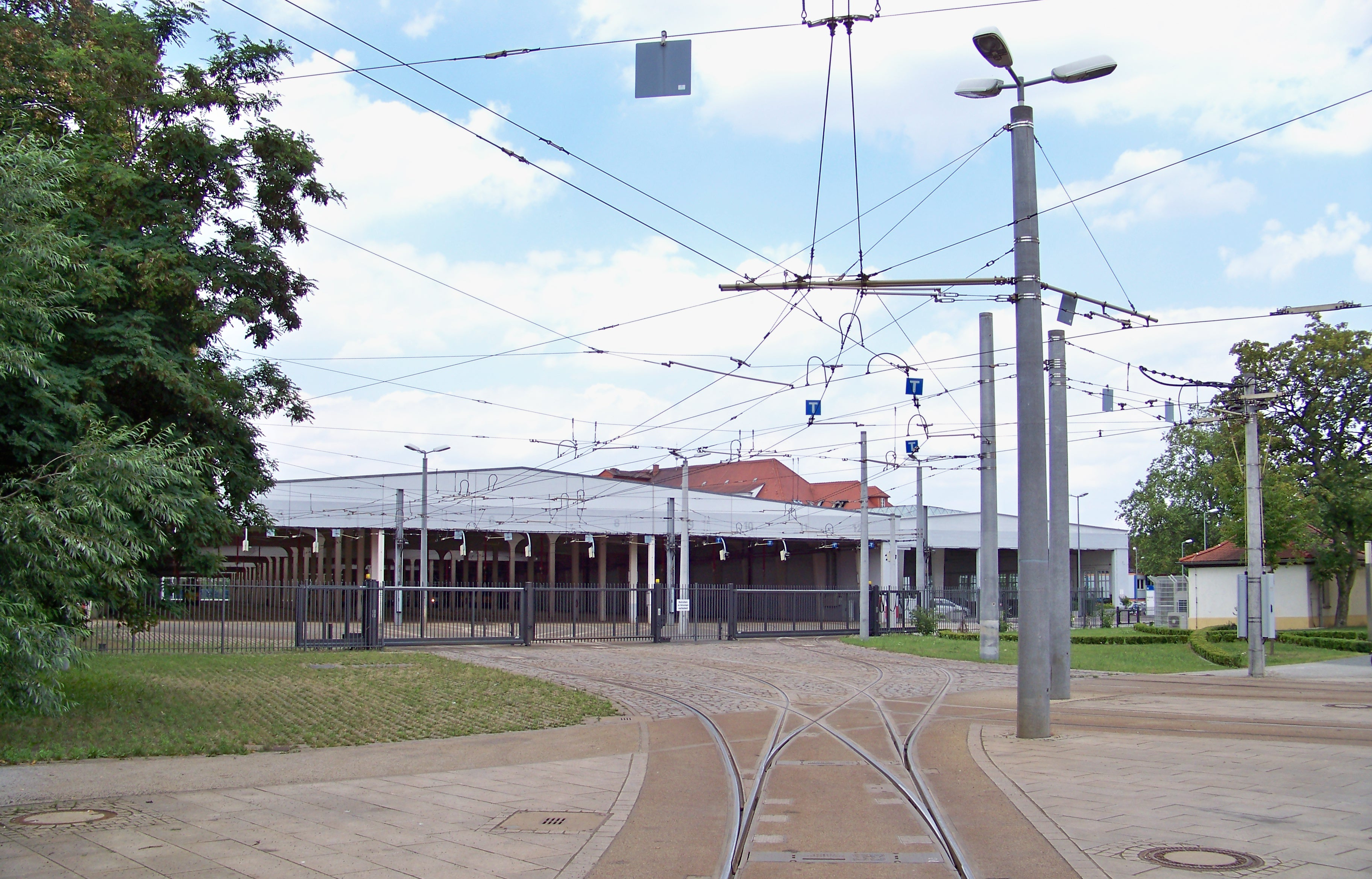
Angerbrücke tram depot

=== Angerbrücke ===
On 4 December 1925, the Angerbrücke tram depot was opened. Among other facilities, it replaced the Kleinzschocher and Plagwitz depots. On 11 June 2005, following a prolonged reconstruction, the depot was ceremoniously reopened. The western hall was rebuilt into through-track configuration, thus creating a rear entrance. At the same time the former eastern hall was converted to a covered car-park but, at the east end of the facility, a new two-track repair shop was built.

Today, Angerbrücke depot, the most modern on the Leipzig tramway network, houses vehicles working Lines 1, 2, 3, 7, 8 and 15. Line 8E trams and buses of Line 130 to Frankenheim also terminate here.

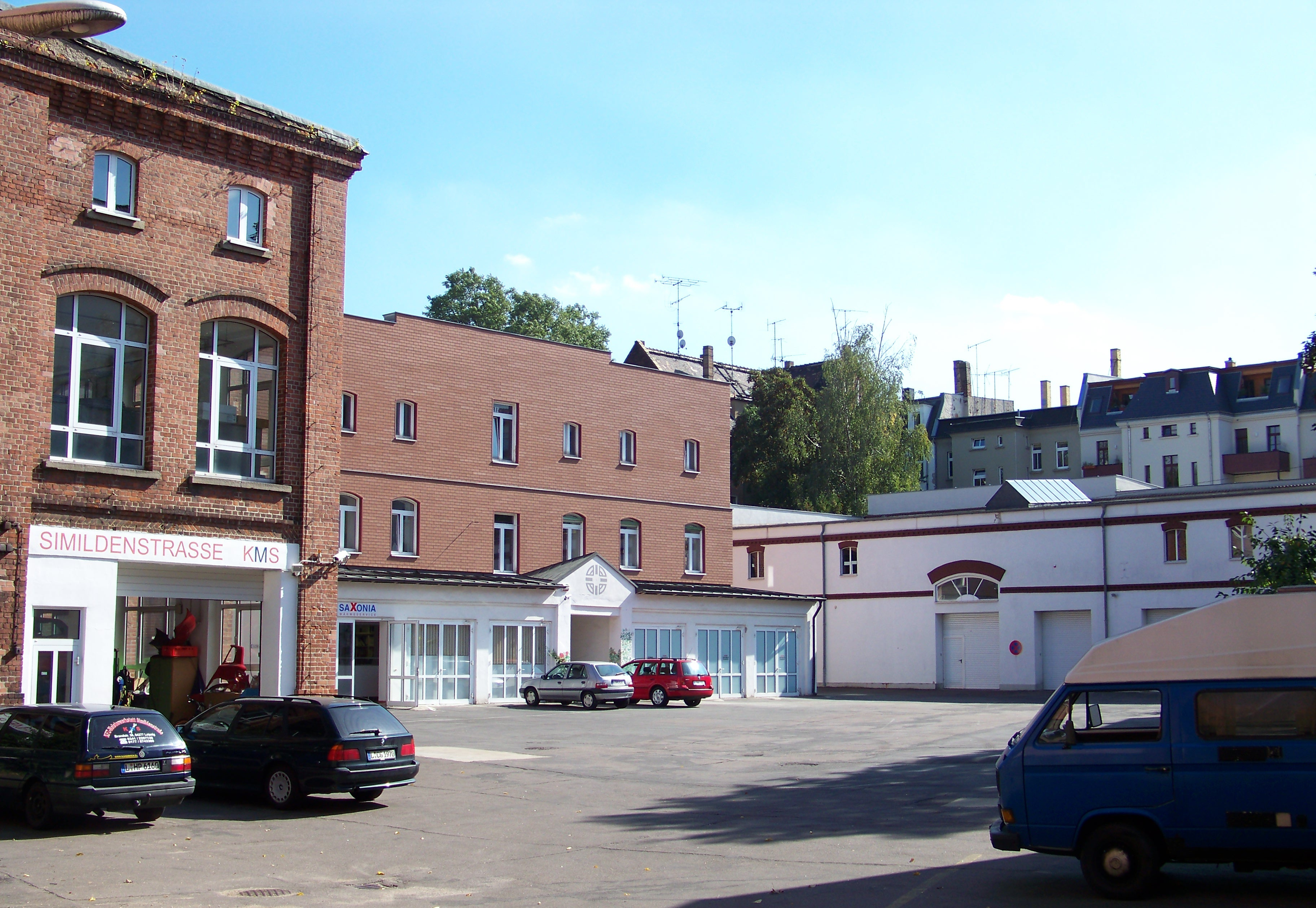
Former Connewitz I tram depot

=== Connewitz I (Brandstraße and Simildenstraße) ===
The LPE opened a new depot in 1891 between the Brandstraße and the Simildenstraße. The distinguishing characteristic of the Connewitz I depot was its two-level tramcar shed. The upper floor was reached from the Simildenstrasse, and the upper floor from the Brandstraße. This depot was also used by the first electric tramcars to operate in Leipzig, on 18 April 1896. The connection to the Brandstraße was removed at the end of 1922 and the beginning of 1923, and the connection to the Simildenstraße was removed in 1931. Only a single track between these roads remained passable thereafter.

A connection from the Brandstraße to two tracks on the lower level was restored in 1939 for "wartime technical reasons" (kriegstechnischen Gründen). The depot was last used in August 1957, when vehicles working Line 24 were based here because the line to the usual depot was obstructed. The entire facility, including service-track connections, was closed in 1963. Remaining tracks may be seen today on the former depot site and in the Simildenstraße.

=== Connewitz II (Zwenkauer Straße) ===
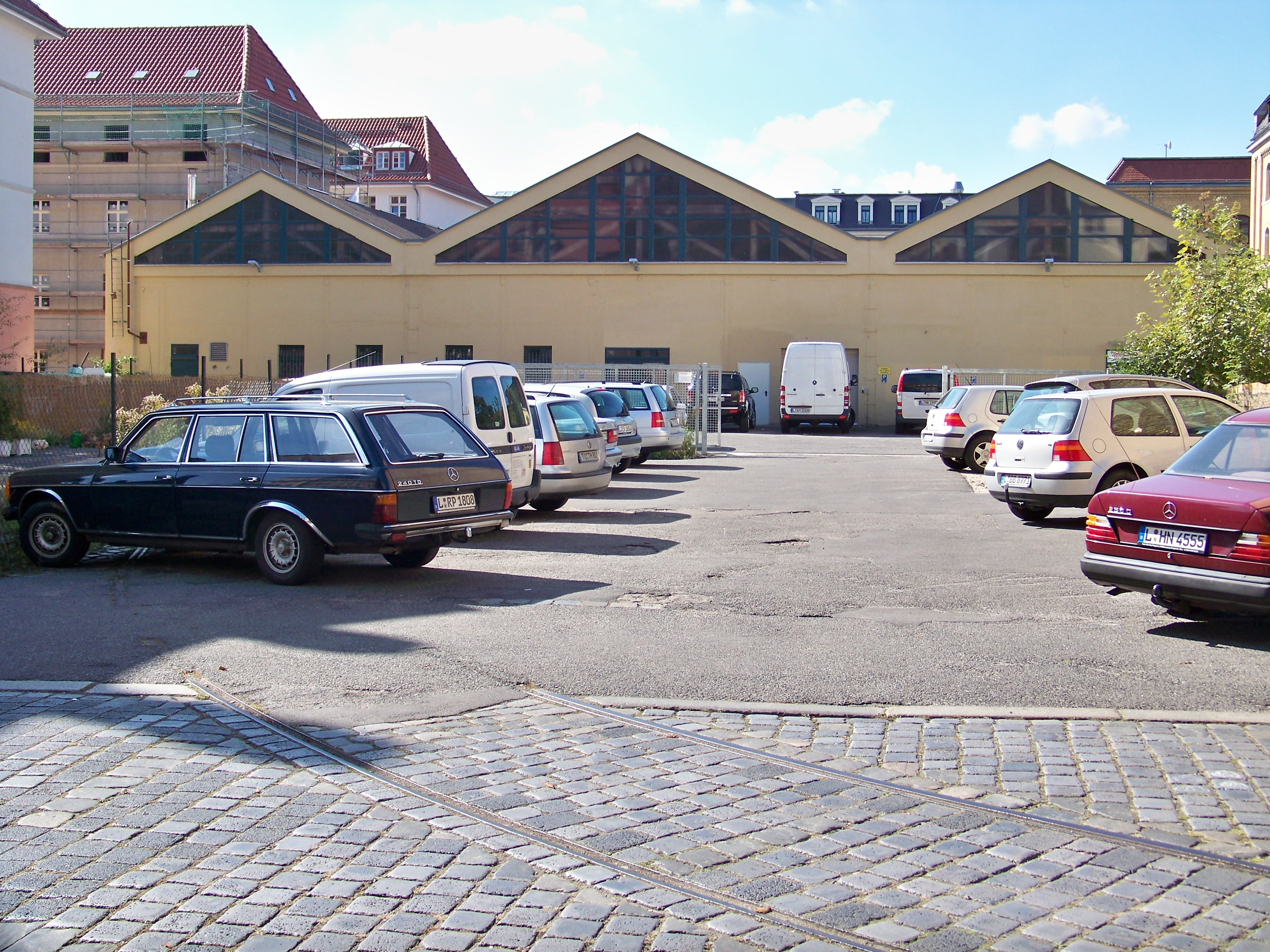
Former Connewitz II tram depot

The LESt opened their second southern depot (after Kleinzschocher) on 10 November 1912. After the merger with the GLSt in 1929, this depot was used for painting of rolling stock and running repairs. Because of the August 1957 obstruction which cut off access to the usual depot, Connewitz II depot was used again by cars working Lines 10, 11 and 22. The last use of the tramcar shed was in 1960/61 by cars working Line 26. The entire facility was closed in 1963. The last remnants of the depot, the Wendeschleife Hildebrandstraße, which extended across part of the depot area, was disconnected from the network on 21 January 1993.

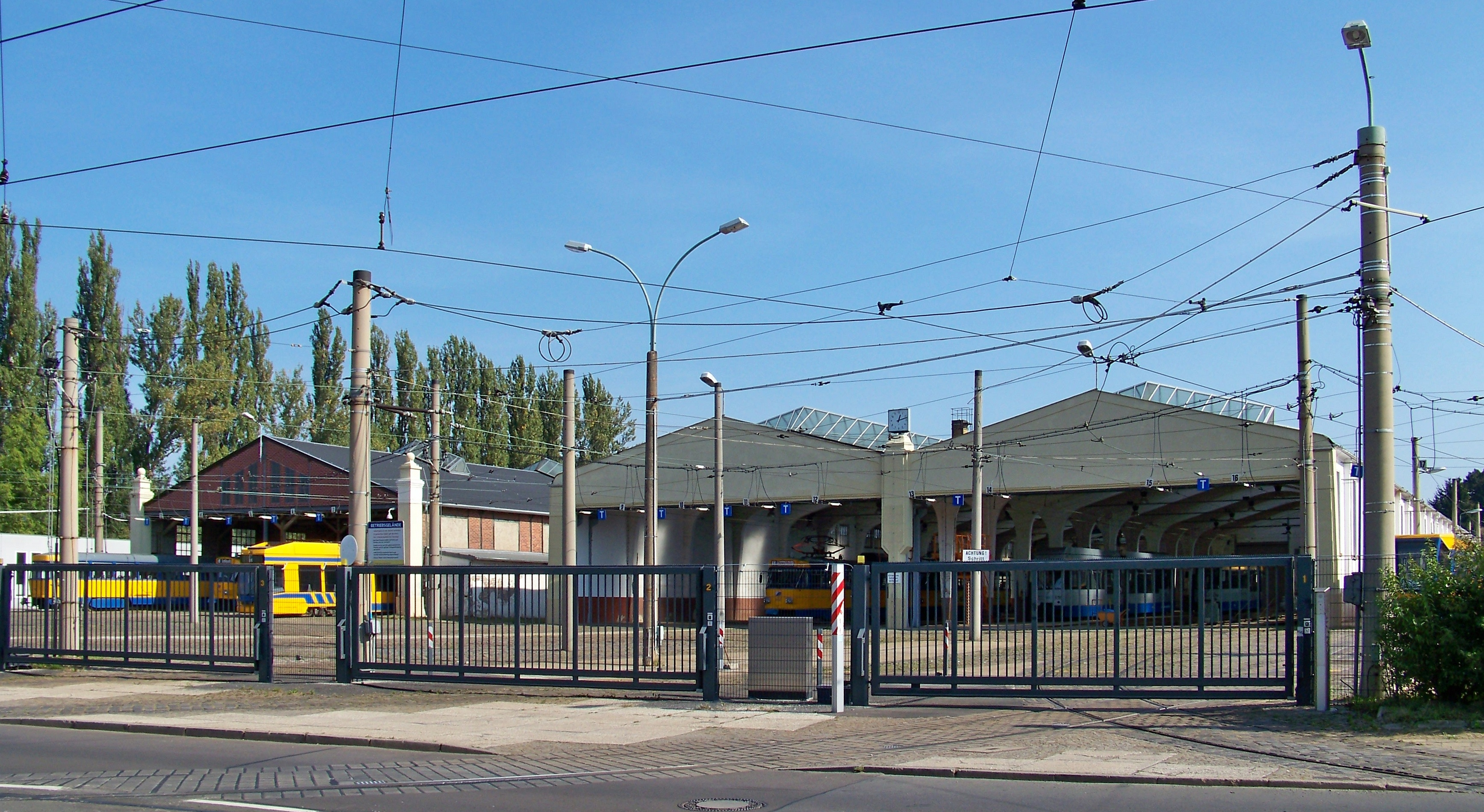
Dölitz tram depot

=== Dölitz ===
In the year 1900 the GLSt opened a depot in Dölitz, opposite what later became the Agra area (Agra-Gelände). Twelve years later, a second tramcar shed was opened. The reversing loop terminal east of this facility was opened prior to 13 July 1984. The depot continues in use and accommodates stock working Lines 9, 10, 11 and 16.

=== Eutritzsch ===
This depot was opened for use as a stable building in the year 1886 for the horse tramway. A small tramcar shed was built in the following year. The depot approach was in the Gräfestraße. This, together with the depot itself, was used by electric tramcars from 17 April 1897. A second tramcar shed, also accessed by the Gräfestraße, entered service in 1899. These two tramcar sheds were enlarged and construction completed on 17 November 1908. After the merger of LESt and GLSt, starting from December 1920, the Eutritzsch depot could be reached from the Delitzscher Straße. In addition, a third tramcar shed was built between the existing sheds, and the old south shed (Südhalle) of 1887 was closed. Eutritzsch depot was already closed for regular operation at 1927. The north shed (Nordhalle) was used for storage of cars which experienced mechanical breakdowns in service. After a few years, the old middle shed (Mittelhalle) was disconnected from the track network in 1935.

The last rolling based here, used to work Lines 16 and 21, were stabled in the north shed from 4 December 1943 to 1949. This became necessary after the Wittenberger Straße depot was bombed. After 1949, up to the final closure on 1 July 1950, the north shed was used for storage of war-damaged rolling stock.

=== Gohlis I (Möckernsche Straße) ===
From 25 July 1883, Gohlis I accommodated the first actual main workshop (Hauptwerkstatt) of the Leipzig tramway network. This workshop could only be accessed by a hand-operated traverser at the rear of the facility. At the time of electrification, on 18 April 1896, Gohlis I was the largest depot of the GLSt. A line terminal, with waiting hall built on the depot grounds, was built here in 1927. A new tramcar shed was built in 1899 and the old main stable building (Hauptstallgebäude) was converted to a tramcar shed. The old workshop shed was disused from 1920, and repairs took place from then on in the tramcar sheds.

The last lines based, according to plan, at Gohlis I, were Lines 28E and 29E, to 24 September 1963. In the meantime Gohlis I had been downgraded to a branch of Möckern depot. The facility was closed at the end of the year 1963.

=== Gohlis II (Landsberger Straße) ===
The Gohlis-Möckern depot was opened on 30 October 1910 by LESt. It was redesignated Gohlis II following the merger with GLST, but was closed in 1917, after only seven years of operation.

The depot was reopened for regular operation on 1 November 1925. From 1 October 1950 Gohlis II depot was named "Jugendbahnhof "Rudi Opitz"" because mainly younger staff members worked here. From 1954 it was a branch of the Möckern depot. The decrease of vehicle requirements following die Wende meant that the Gohlis II depot was no longer needed. Vehicles working Line 6 were stabled from 25 May 1993 at the Wittenberger Straße depot.

=== Heiterblick (Hauptwerkstatt, 'Main Workshop') ===
The area was opened 1915 as an aircraft building facility and has since had its own railway stop. In addition, an airfield was built together with an observation tower. The Versailles Treaty terminated aircraft construction. The Leipzig local authority purchased the land and built facilities for a tramway main workshop (Straßenbahn-Hauptwerkstatt), opened 1 June 1926.

From the outset, the HW (Hauptwerkstatt) Heiterblick has performed repairs and (partial) new construction of rolling stock. It is not used for stabling of tramcars. However, line 3E uses a reversing triangle (wye) on the workshop grounds.

=== Kleinzschocher ===
In order to reduce empty travel to and from depots (pull-outs and pull-ins), around the turn of the (last) century LESt built so-called "overnight accommodation depots" (Übernachtungsdepots). These depots were used exclusively for stabling of vehicles, and no repairs were performed here. Kleinzschocher Depot, such an "overnight accommodation depot" was opened on 15 October 1898. Workshop operations were started here from 1906. A new tramcar shed, north of the old, was then built, and opened on 15 November 1912. This depot was supplanted by opening of Angerbrücke Depot in 1926. Thereafter, it was not used for stabling of tramcars, but for storage of cars awaiting repair or scrapping. After the Second World War through the mid-1950s, tramcars working Line 3 were based here on occasion. The depot was closed in the year 1959.

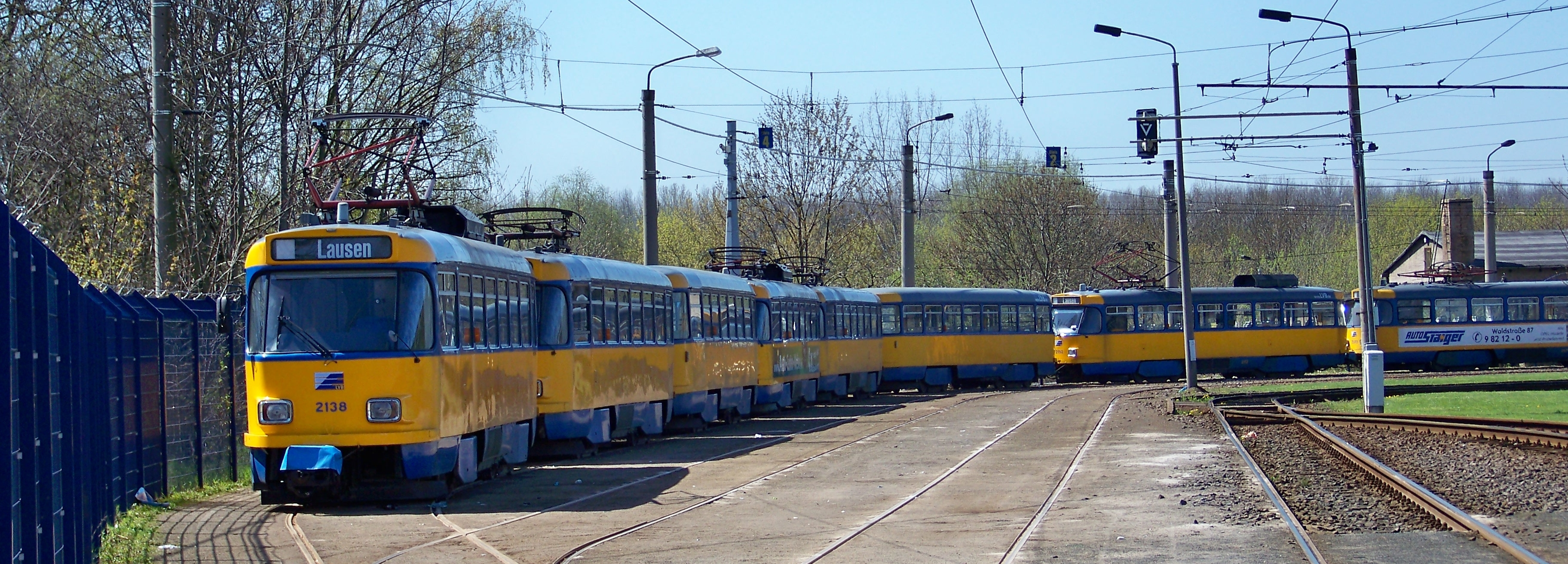
Lausen storage facility

=== Lausen ===
The Lausen storage facility is behind the Lausen terminal. It was opened on 28 September 1986 accommodates today some of the rolling stock used on Lines 1 and 2.

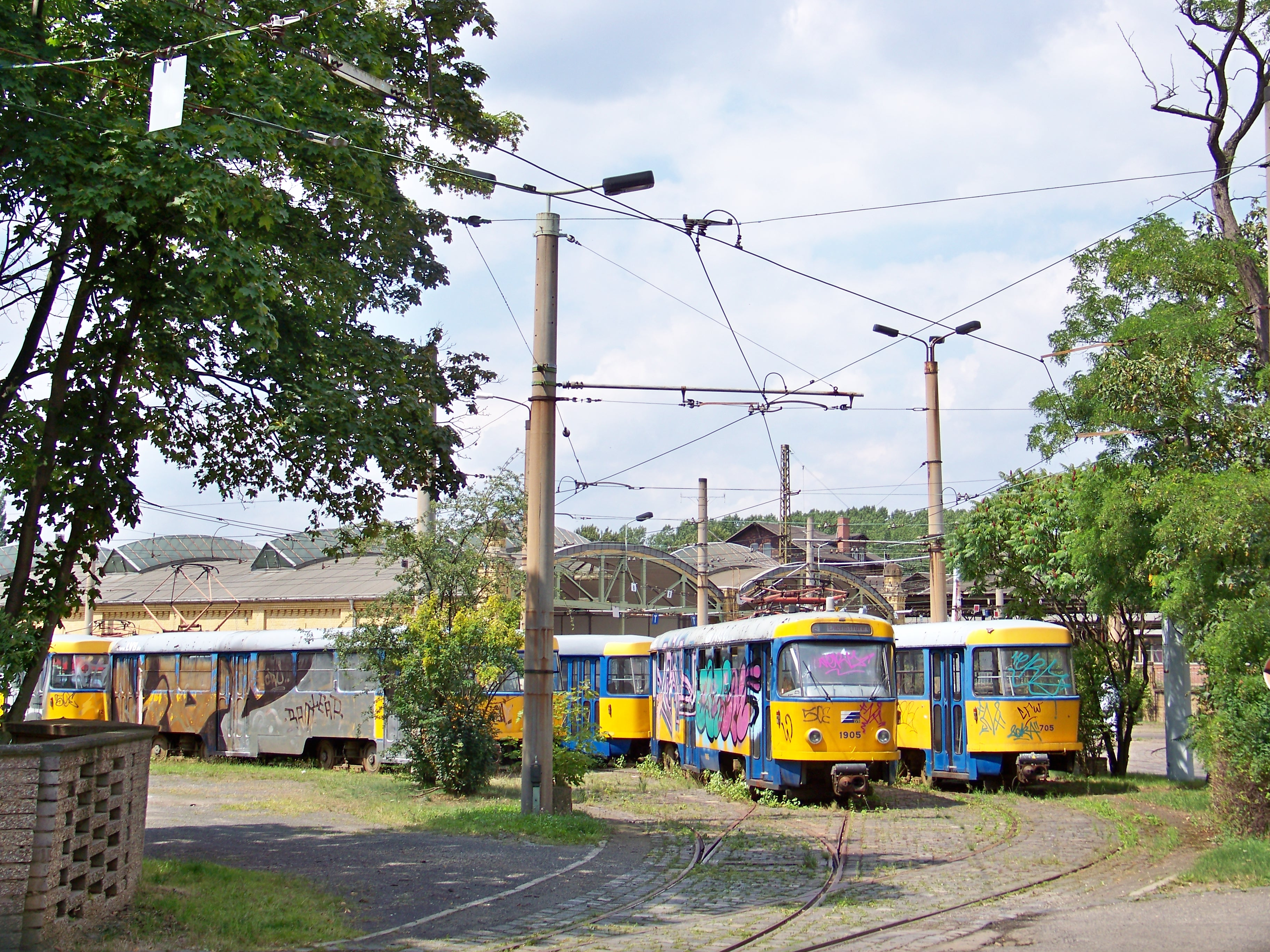
Leutzsch tram depot with retired Tatra T4D (2009)

=== Leutzsch ===
On 24 March 1908, the GLSt opened a new Leutzsch Depot at the likewise new Leutzsch terminal. Some of the vehicles stabled at Lindenau could now be shifted to here. Before the First World War, the storage tracks were expanded and the double-track terminus expanded. In 1968 the last vehicles used for Line 27 were shifted to Angerbrücke Depot, and operations from Leutzsch Depot thus ceased for the time being. Starting from 26 September 1982, after installation of new storage facilities, a workshop for Tatra stock as well as a connecting curve at the Rathaus Leutzsch in the direction of Böhlitz-Ehrenberg, tramcars were once again stabled here. From 18 July 1991, Leutzsch Depot lost its "self-sufficiency" and became a branch of Angerbrücke Depot. With the revision of services that took effect from 27 May 2001, operations again ceased from Leutzsch Depot. During reconstruction of Angerbrücke Depot from 2003 to 11 June 2005, Leutzsch Depot experienced a "Renaissance" when stock assigned to Lines 3, 7, 8 and 15 had to be accommodated here. With the reopening of Angerbrücke, Leutzsch Depot is idle.

=== Lindenau ===
On the site of today's Lindenau motorbus depot, a tram depot and workshop was established in 1899. The latter had a notable characteristic: only one of the four tracks was connected to the tram network. The others were accessed by transfer table. Within a year, a power plant and an additional tramcar shed had already been built. A third tramcar shed, with transfer table, was built in 1907. Following construction of the new depots, the last tramcars working Line P were relocated to Probstheida Depot. The oldest tramcar shed was converted into a trackless workshop building. Nevertheless, in the same year, a new workshop building was opened, which tramcars could access only on transfer tables. In 1924, another workshop was established at Hinterfeld, with most of the tracks connected by a new transfer table. These complicated facilities as well as the ever-growing number of buses made a new solution urgently necessary.

The Lindenau workshops could be abolished after opening of the new main workshop at Heiterblick, in August 1927. Motorbuses were stabled at Lindenau from 1 April 1928. The tramcar shed opened in 1924 had a track connection to 1972, thereafter, it was no longer necessary to accommodate tramcars. The three tracks between the two sheds opened in 1899 still exist and from 27 March 1984 connected via a reversing triangle ("wye") to the Lützner Straße. Lindenau Depot housed trolleybuses from 1938 to 1975.

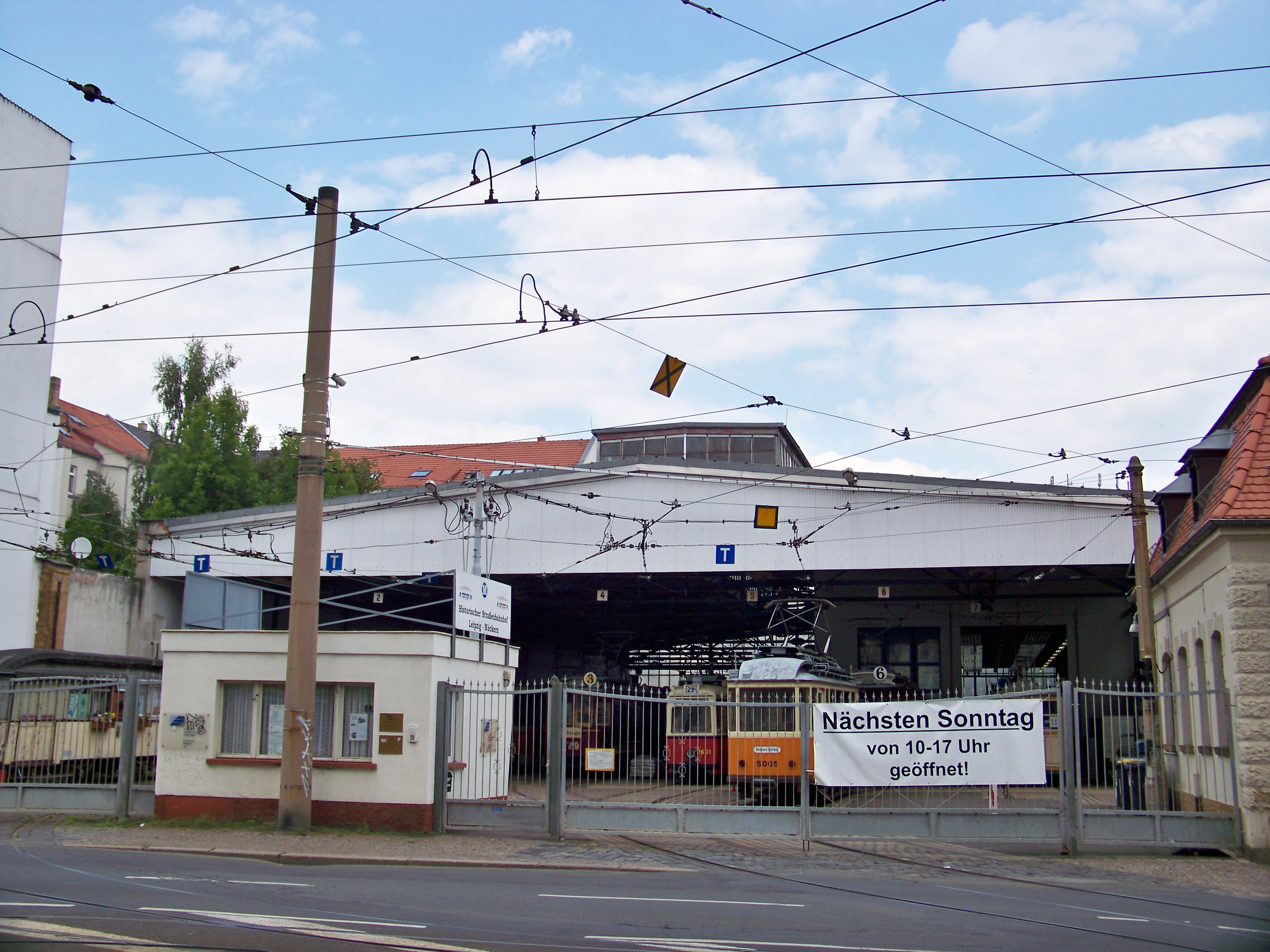
Möckern tramway museum

=== Möckern ===
A terminal facility on the future depot site had already been built by 1905. The tramcar shed and the workshop were opened on 1 July 1907. Until about 1924, tramcars could reach two of the four depot tracks only by transfer table. A second four-track tramcar shed was opened in 1909. Line 10 tramcars used depot tracks for shunting until 1926.

The depot burned on 19 March 1972, and tramcars were stabled here again from October. The workshop was reopened only in 1986, but from then was able to accommodate Tatra stock. The depot was last used for operations at the end of the 1990s. Since that time, Möckern Depot had seen a new use, as a tramway museum. At the end of the 2018 season, all historic tram-cars were moved from Möckern to the new tramway museum at former Wittenberger Straße depot and the use as a tramway depot ended after 111 years.

=== Paunsdorf ===
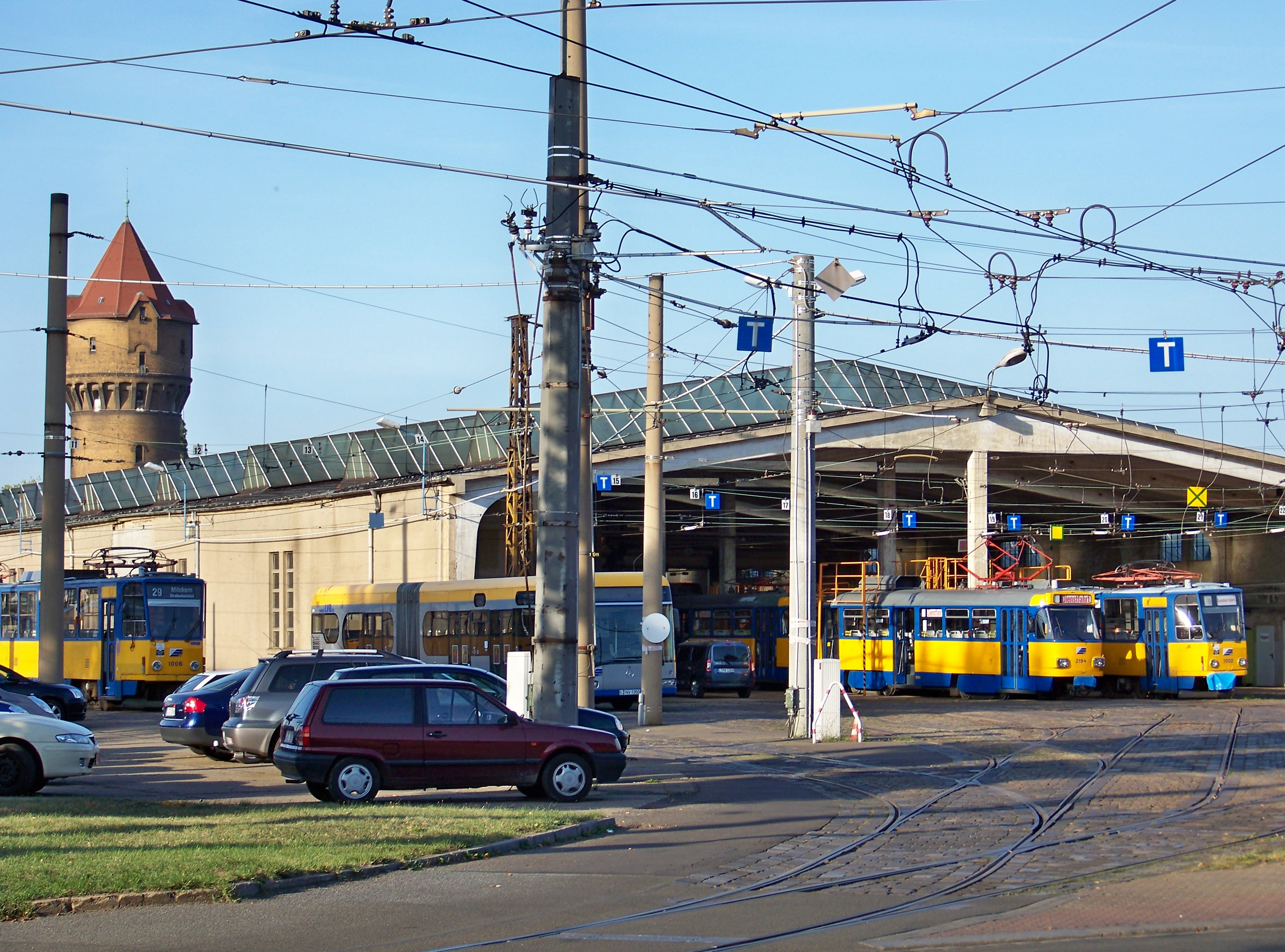
Paunsdorf tram depot

The LESt opened its last new depot on 1 June 1913. It burned to the ground on 23 June 1920. Only in 1922 could the tramcar sheds be reopened, but for storage of old tramcars, not for stabling of active rolling stock. However, from 1 October 1924, tramcars were again based at Paunsdorf. A second tramcar shed was inaugurated on 9 June 1926. In the year 1965 a workshop was opened. In 1978 the tracks connecting toward the city were connected toward the west of the depot, and the large loop around the depot was opened. Additional connecting tracks were opened in 1987. Lines 3, 7 and 8, and also some motorbuses, are based at Paunsdorf Depot today.

=== Plagwitz ===
On 24 December 1881 the LPE opened a new depot in Plagwitz, at Karl-Heine-Straße 85/87. After an expansion of the old shed in 1889, one of the horse stables was converted into a tramcar shed in 1895 and the other in 1897. The facility was again expanded in 1908. Vehicles working Line F were based here to 1917. Plagwitz was no longer used as an operating depot from 4 December 1925, when the new Angerbrücke Depot was opened. The facilities were used for storage of cars awaiting scrapping until closure in 1935.

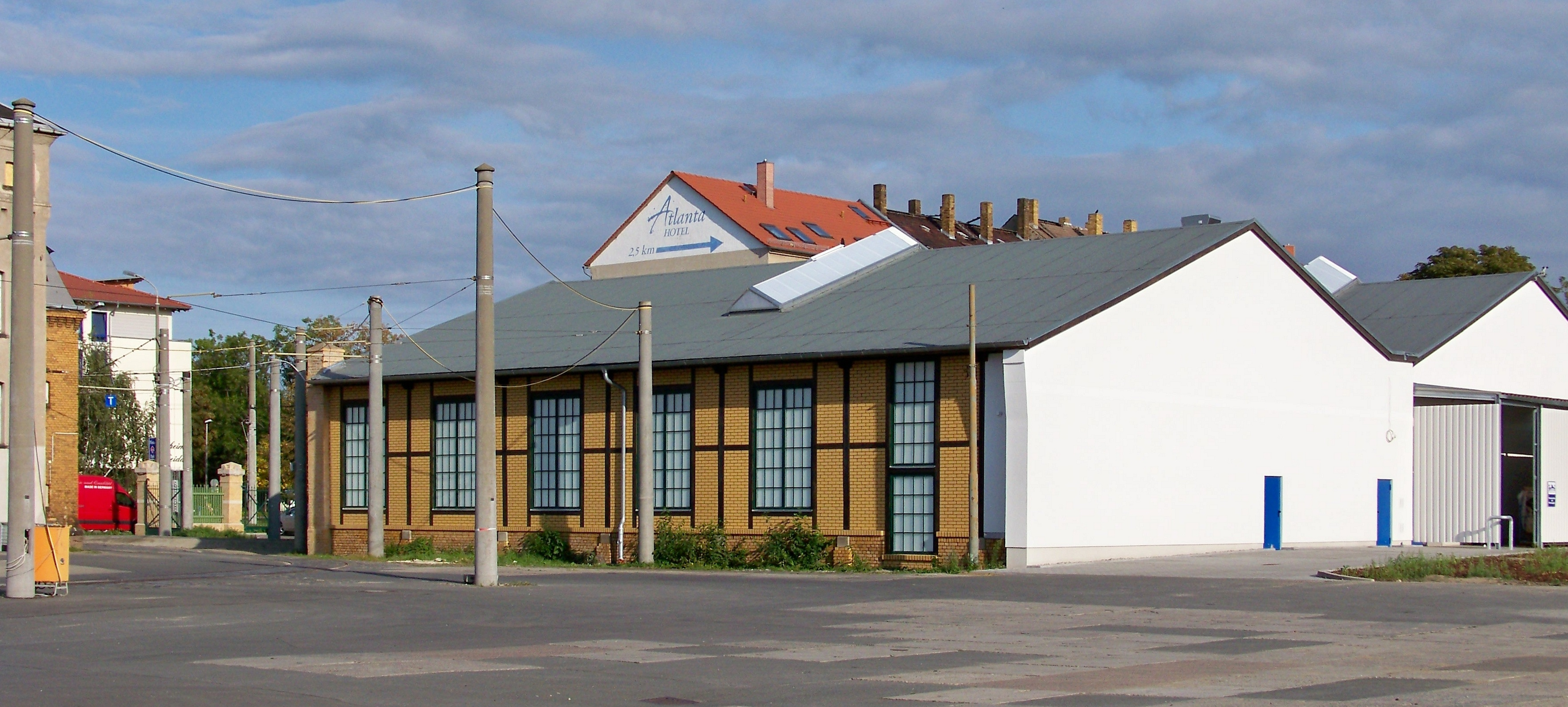
Former Probstheida tram depot

=== Probstheida ===
The GLSt opened its line to Probstheida on 20 December 1900. The company opened its Probstheida terminal and depot on 1 May 1913. A new tramcar shed, south of the original facility, was opened on 4 September 1912.

The Probstheida Depot was closed to tramcars from 1 August 1973 and converted to a motorbus depot. Motorbuses were based here from 15 April 1977. However, the three-track tram terminal, removed in 1988 was replaced by a single track in 2005.

=== Reudnitz ===
The first tramcar depot in Leipzig, and the company head office of the LPE, was located at the depot in the Dresdner Straße, in Reudnitz. This was used for the first horse tramway line opened on 18 May 1872 opens. The tramcar shed had to be expanded five years thereafter. After the electrification of the depot from 2. March 1897 the horse stables were torn down. In May 1910 the GLSt opened a new tramcar shed in its place. A third shed, which tramcars could access only from the Täubchenweg, was opened in 1926.

The LVB expanded Reudnitz Depot from 1970 to 1972, and built the access tracks to the Dresdner Straße and from the Täubchenweg. In addition, at the rear, a tramcar shed connected to the Täubchenweg was opened and between the Dresdner Straße and this shed an open-air storage yard was created. The project was finished with the opening of a terminal loop on the depot grounds on 5 December 1972.

The depot was closed from 6 May 1998 after nearly 126 years of operation, because of the decline in passenger traffic following the political turning point of 1989 and reductions in tramcar fleet size. Sufficient free capacity was present at Paunsdorf Depot for the vehicles based at Reudnitz. The track connection to the Täubchenweg was removed, but the entry switches in the Dresdner Straße were only removed in 2005.

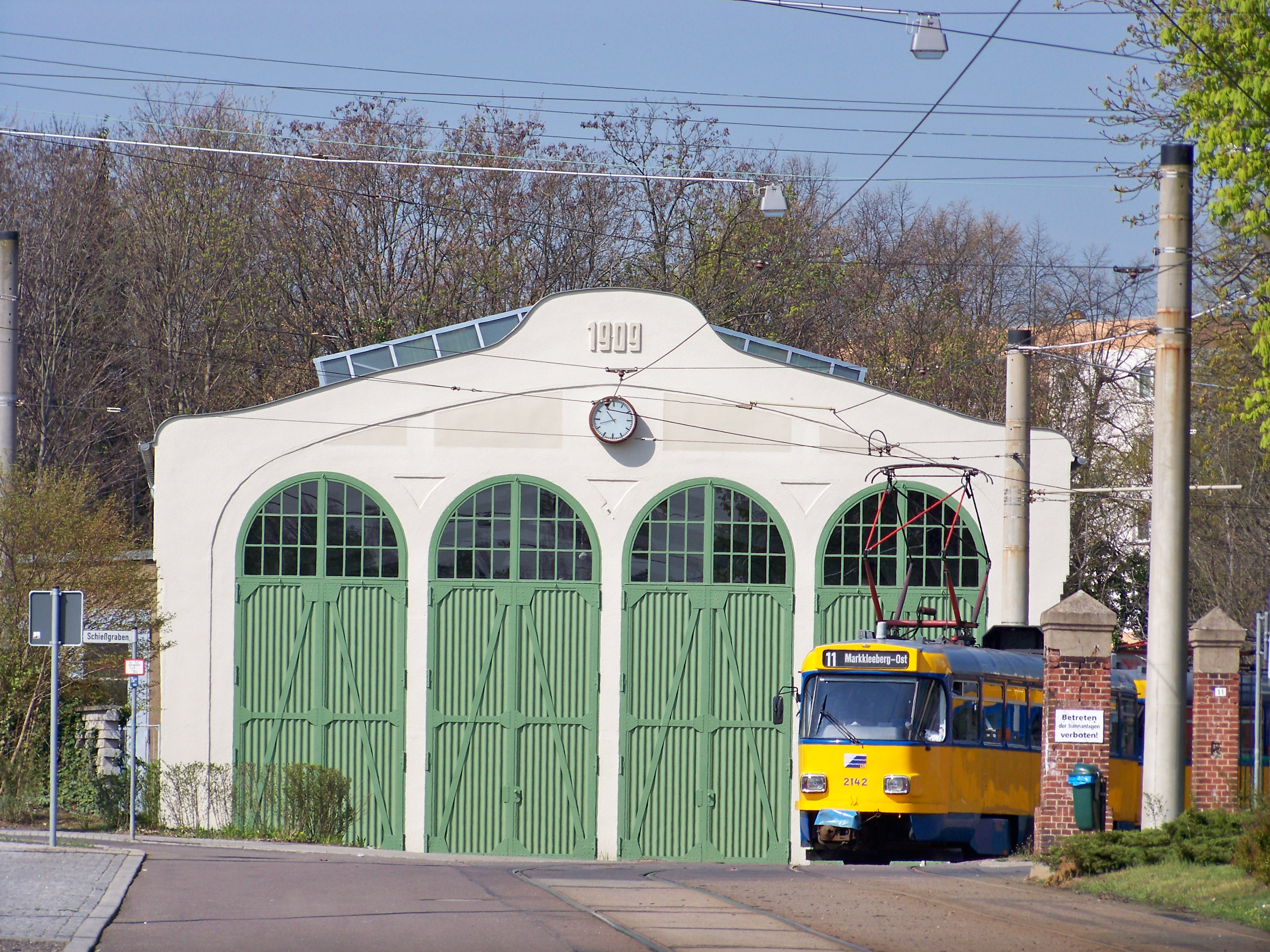
Former Schkeuditz tram depot

=== Schkeuditz ===
The only depot owned by the LAAG was at its terminal in Schkeuditz. The company opened it on 27 October 1910. The terminal loop was built as recently as 1958. The LVB closed the depot ca. 2001. It had not been used for stabling of tramcars for some years, but housed the collection of museum tramcars. This collection was moved subsequently to Möckern.

=== Sellerhausen/Bennigsenstraße ===
In 1909, when the Reudnitz Depot of the GLSt was expanded, some of the vehicles stabled there had to be relocated. For this purpose, two sidings were built along the Bennigsenstraße at the Torgauer Platz and opened on 7 October 1909. This facility was removed in 1910, after work was completed at Reudnitz.

=== Stötteritz ===
An additional "overnight accommodation depot" was opened by the LESt on 15 May 1898 at the Holzhäuser Straße tram terminal. A second tramcar shed was built by 1908. By 1917, vehicles working Line 6 were relocated to Probstheida Depot, and Stötteritz was no longer used as an operating base. The GLSt reopened this depot between 1924 and 1926, but only as branch of Reudnitz Depot. Thereafter, the company used this facility for storage of disused rolling stock. Approach tracks were rebuilt in 1929 and the connecting tracks changed to face away from the town center (landwärtiger). From December 1943 to the early 1950s, tramcars working Lines 6 and 7 as well as trailers used on Line 4 were serviced here. The LVB closed Stötteritz Depot in 1957.

=== Wittenberger Straße ===
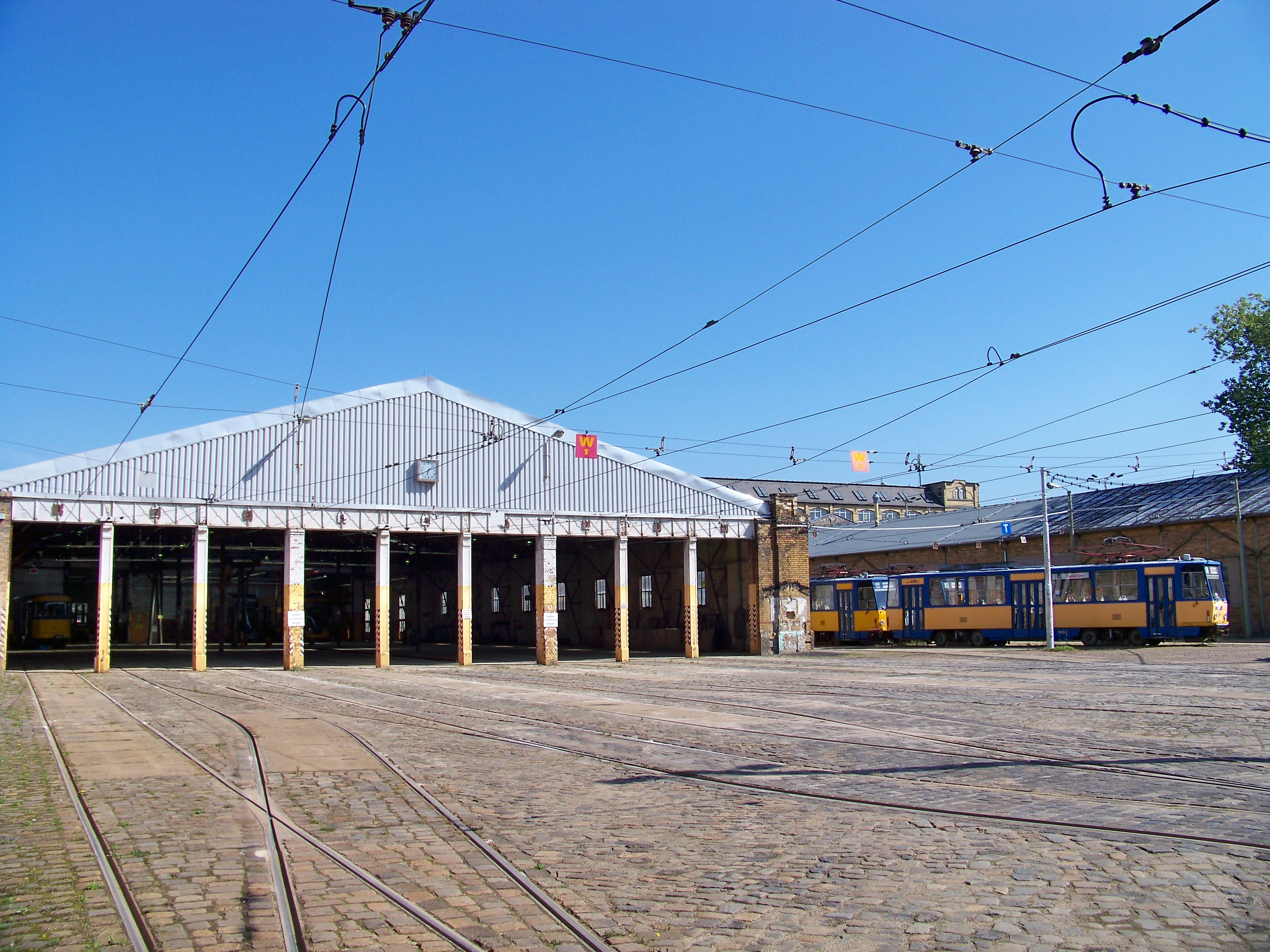
Wittenberger Straße tram depot

The LESt opened this depot, near the town center, on 20 May 1896. At first it had two tramcar sheds with a workshop in between. This could be accessed only by means of a transfer table. All facilities were at first connected only to the Wittenberger Straße. A transfer table at the rear of the facility, connecting all the tramcar shed tracks, was opened on 20 August 1898. At the same time the depot was connected to the tracks in the Apelstraße, because an additional small workshop and an additional tramcar shed were built, which did not have exits to the Wittenberger Straße. An open-air storage yard was established at the corner of the Apelstraße and the Berliner Straße. This was accessible only by transfer table. Only in October 1909 was the first connecting track opened between the Apelstraße and the Wittenberger Straße.

After GLSt revised the service pattern in 1920, only the workshop remained in use. The tramcar shed connected to the Apelstraße was used to store vehicles belonging to the track construction department. The depot was reopened as an operating division in 1927. After the new main workshop at Heiterblick was opened, the majority of workshop activity could be moved there. In order to simply depot access, the transfer tables were removed in October 1928 and the former workshop shed was connected directly to the Wittenberger Straße. The open-air storage yard was closed.

On 4 December 1943 the depot was destroyed to a large extent by allied bombers. Only one part of the workshop remained usable. Part of the site of the former tramcar shed connected to the Apelstraße was cleared in 1945 and a new open-air storage yard created. The depot could again be used for stabling of trams used in service only from 1949.

Extensive reconstruction was started in 1964. The Bitterfelder Straße loop track was completed by 1968. From 1980, trams could no longer turn directly from the Apelstraße in the direction of the Berliner Straße, but only away from the town center (landwärts). This measure had become necessary because the LVB wished to expand the open-air storage yard by an additional 11 tracks. The modernized workshop was reopened on 8 November 1992. In the late 2000s, the depot was turned into a storage facility and finally closed in late 2015. In 2019, the depot was reopened as new location of the Leipzig tramway museum and is now the home of all historic tramway cars of the city.

== See also ==
- Trams in Leipzig
- List of town tramway systems in Germany
- Trams in Germany
