= Connewitz =

District of Leipzig in Saxony, Germany

- Stadtteil of Leipzig
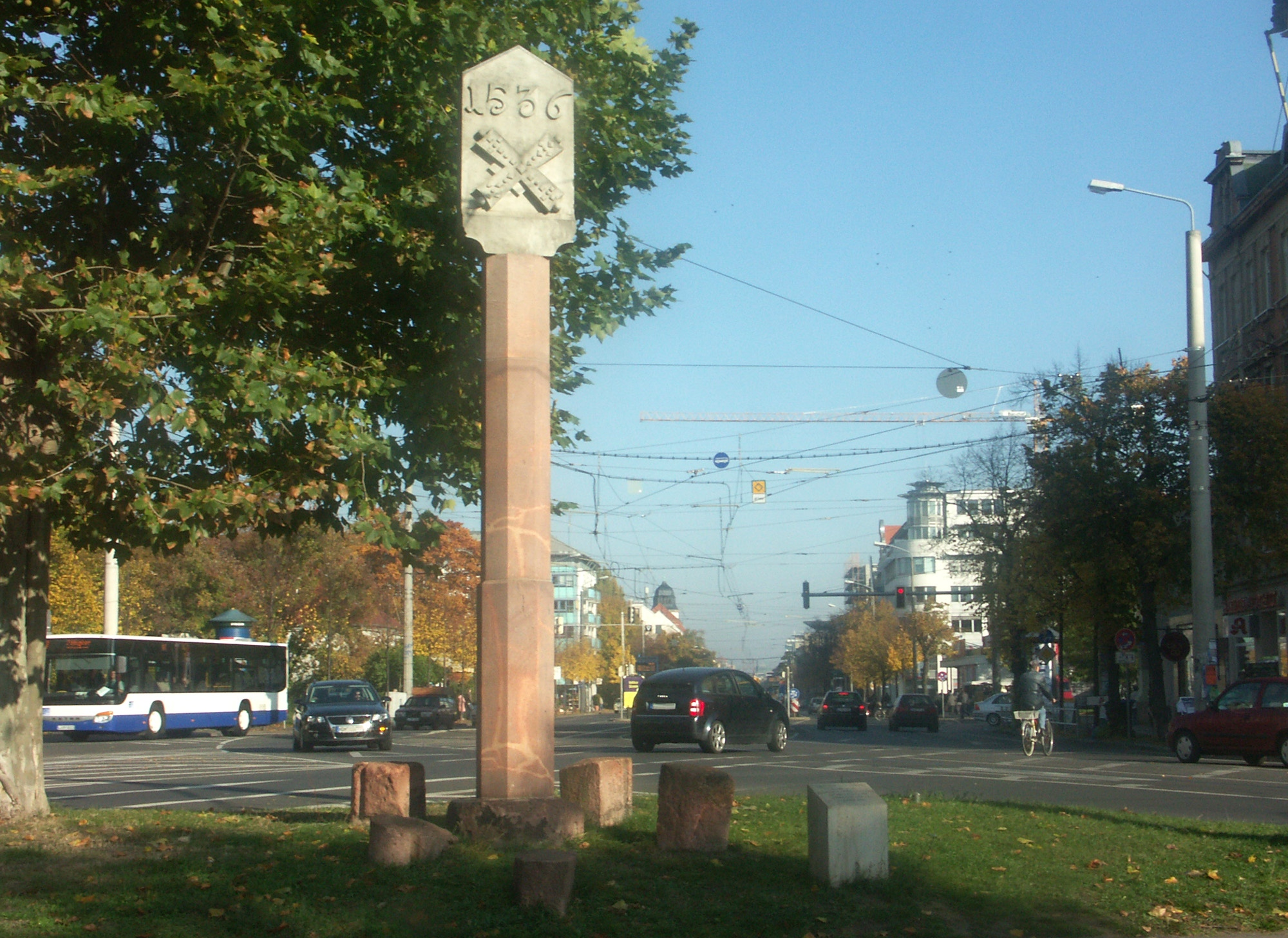
- Connewitz Cross

- Coat of arms

- Location of Connewitz within Leipzig
- Interactive map of Connewitz
- Location within Germany Location within Saxony
- Coordinates: 51°18′35.6″N 12°22′23.6″E
- Country: Germany
- State: Saxony
- City: Leipzig
- Founded: 1891

Area
  - Total: 16.86 km^{2} (6.51 sq mi)
- Elevation: 122 m (400 ft)

Population (2023-12-31)
  - Total: 19,798
  - Density: 1,174/km^{2} (3,041/sq mi)
- Time zone: UTC+01:00 (CET)
  - Summer (DST): UTC+02:00 (CEST)
- Postal codes: 04277
- Dialling codes: 0341

Connewitz (German pronunciation: [ˈkɔnəvɪts]) is a locality in Leipzig in Saxony, Germany. It is a subdivision (Ortsteil) in the borough of Leipzig-Süd (Stadtbezirk).

== Geography ==
=== Location ===
Connewitz is located about 3 km (1.9 mi) south of downtown Leipzig. The area includes floodplain forests and former fields to the east and up to ten meters higher. Only this area is developed.

Schleußiger Weg, Wundt Street, and Richard-Lehmann-Street form the northern boundaries of the district. The eastern and southeastern borders are formed by the Leipzig–Hof railway line. In the south, the built-up area of Markkleeberg forms the border. Here, however, a few short streets in the area called the Wolfswinkel still belong to Connewitz in an isolated location. The Plagwitz-Markkleeberg railway line the western embankment of the Elster floodplain and the western bank of the Elster floodplain follow to the west.

The neighboring localities are, clockwise from the north, Südvorstadt, Marienbrunn, Lößnig, Dölitz-Dösen, Markkleeberg (independent town), Großzschocher, Kleinzschocher and Schleußig.

=== Forest and water ===
With 384 ha (948.9 acres) of forest (53% of its area), Connewitz has the largest proportion of forest in Leipzig's districts. This forest, the Connewitzer Holz, forms the main part of the southern Leipzig Riverside Forest as a contiguous area. It is used for both forestry and recreational purposes. In addition to a dense network of footpaths, cycle paths and bridleways, there is also the Leipzig Wildlife Park, which is home to indigenous animal species. Sports and catering facilities are also available.

Historically, Connewitzer Holz and Dölitzer Holz on the other side of the southeastern district boundary on the right bank of the Pleiße formed the Leipziger Ratsholz. Before the village merged with Ötzsch and Dölitz at the beginning of the 20th century, this forest area was interrupted only by a few meadows.

The forest district Connewitzer Holz is divided into Beipert and Probstei on the left side of the river Pleiße and Batschke-Floß ditches, Pfarrholz, Haken, Wolfswinkel, Langes Feld, Dachsbau, Horst, Gautzscher Spitze und Siebenacker between Floß ditches and Pleiße and Streitholz, Stempel, Mühlholz and Apitzsch on the right side of the river Pleiße.

The Pleiße runs the full length of the Connewitzer Holz from south to north. As early as the first half of the 13th century, the three villages of Dölitz, Lößnig, and Connewitz jointly built a ditch off the Pleiße for the operation of their mills, the Mühlpleiße, which still runs today, with minor changes, in the border area between the forest and the settlement area and flows into the Pleiße at the Hakenbrücke bridge. Shortly before this, the flood bed of the Pleiße flows into the Pleiße on the left in the area of the former Jungfernlachen estuary.

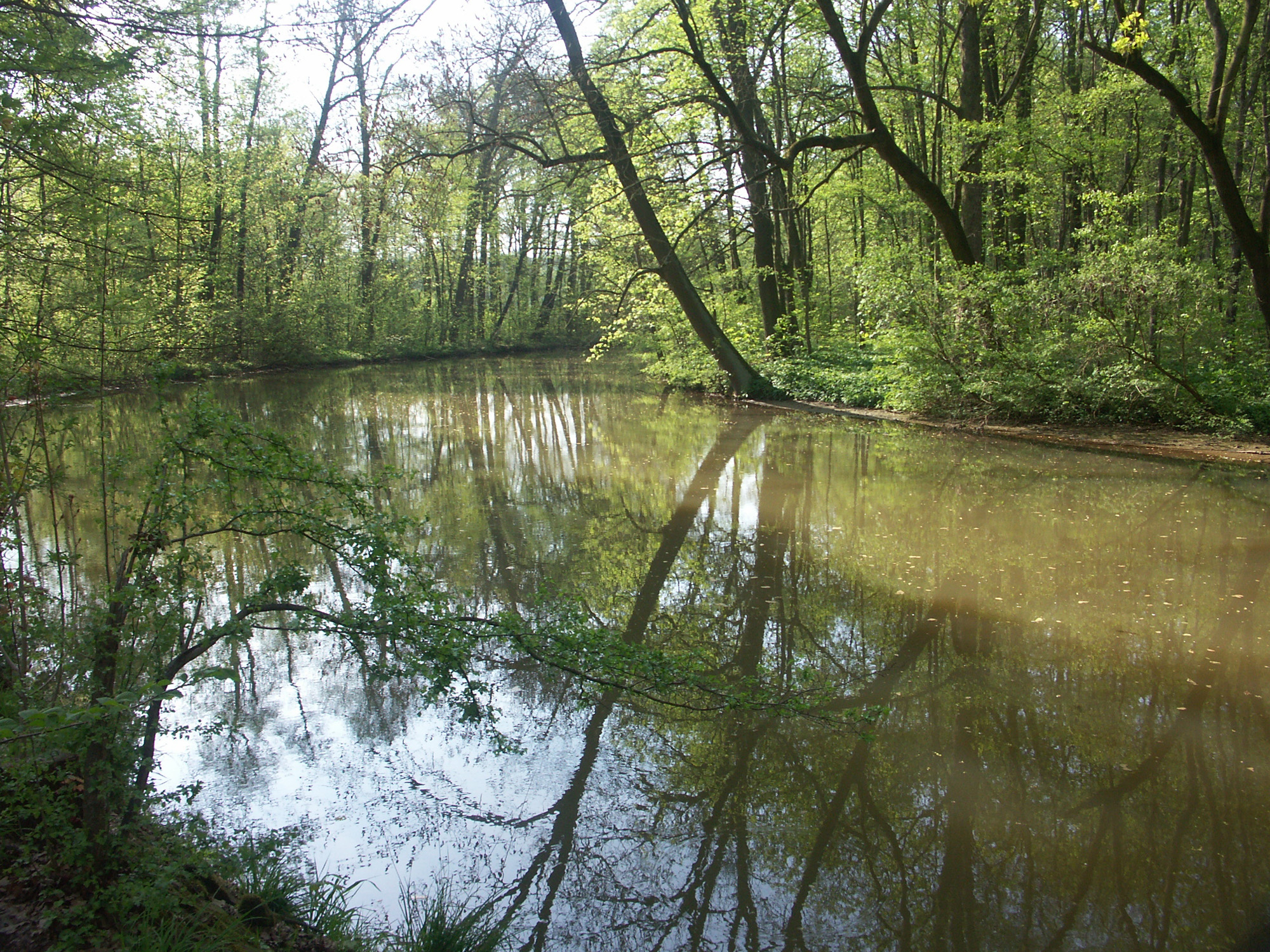
The Pleiße in Connewitz wood

About 150 m (492.1 ft) to the left is the Panichs Lache and about 350 m (1,148.3 ft) to the left is the Batschke, usually called Floß ditches in Leipzig. The Batschke used to be a branch of the White Elster near Zwenkau and was once used to raft firewood across the Weiße Elster to Leipzig. The connection to the Elster River was interrupted by lignite mining. Today the Floß ditches receive its water from Cospudener See. It is the connection between Leipzig's waterways and Cospudener See and, since the completion of a bridge in Markkleeberg, can be used for continuous boat traffic.

Further west, in addition to numerous oxbow lakes and puddles, there is another waterway, the Paußnitz. A former tributary of the Batschke, it is fed with Elster water via the Grenz ditches and flows into the Elster floodplain. The latter forms the western border of Connewitz. It was built for flood protection and, like the Pleiße, is used for water sports. Still, in Connewitz, the Pleißemühl ditches branch off at the Pleiße weir and flows through the southern suburbs to the city center.

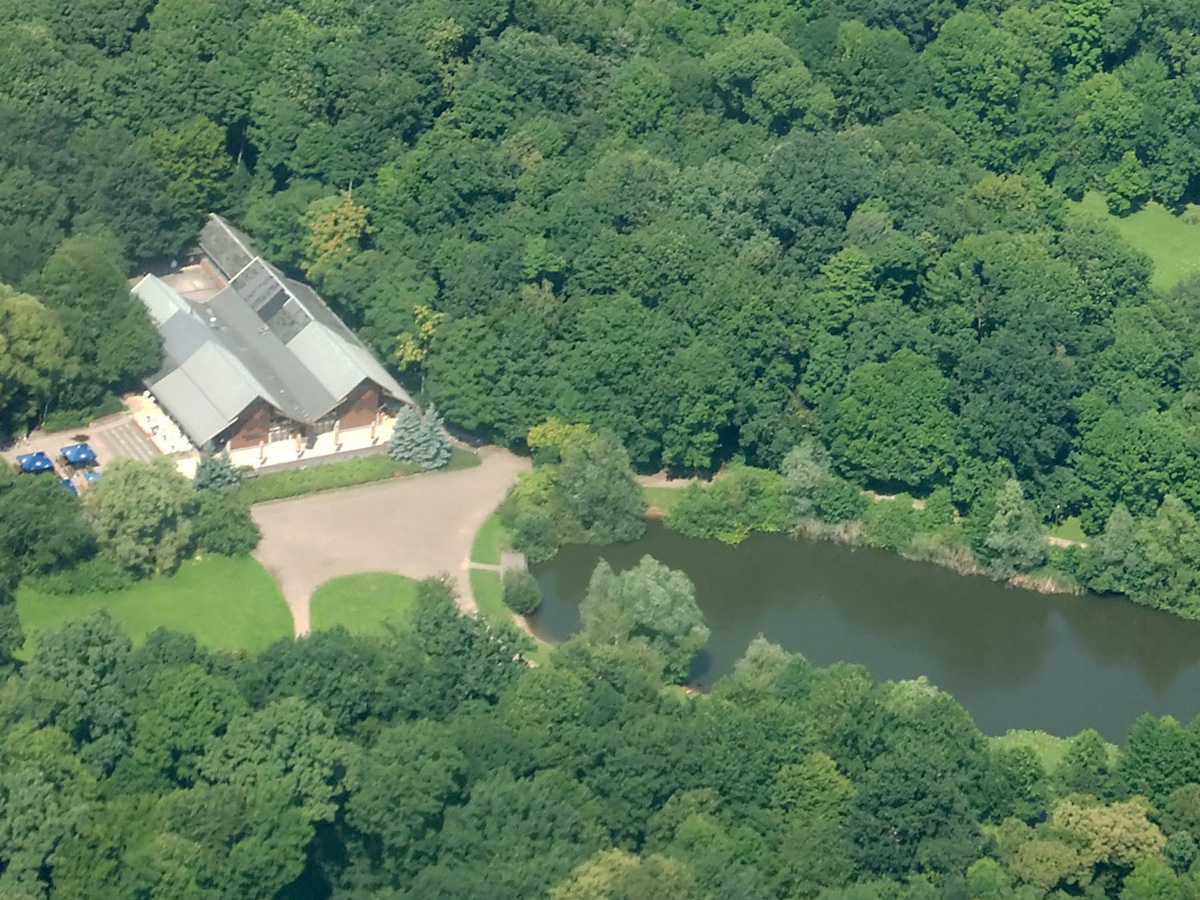
The Leipzig Wildlife Park restaurant

In historical times there were two watercourses east of the Pleiße in Connewitz. The Trenken ditches (also known as Tränken ditches) came from Probstheida via the Connewitz field (today Marienbrunn) and the area of Hildebrandt street to the Mühlpleiße. Today it is piped and integrated into Leipzig's sewage system. The second was the Dom ditches, from the Marienquelle (near the Monument to the Battle of Nations) roughly along the course of today's Richard-Lehmann Street westward to Heilemann Street and then southward into the former Streitteich pond. Today, only depressions in the ground on the south side of Richard-Lehmann Street and between Heilemann Street and Focke Street remain as reminders of the Dom ditches.

The Streitteich pond in the area of today's Teich Street was the largest of the nine former Connewitz ponds, most of which were located along the Trenken ditches. The former poplar pond near Bornaische Street is still indicated today by the low location of the allotment gardens on Burgstädter Street. The Connewitz village pond was located at the intersection of Probstheidaer Street and Prinz-Eugen Street. Today, the only remaining ponds in Connewitz are the hook pond at the Wildpark guesthouse, which was built in the early 1970s, the smaller frog pond in the Wildpark, and a pond between the buildings on Prinz-Eugen-Street and Mühlpleiße with a connection to the latter.

== History ==
=== The Connewitz village ===
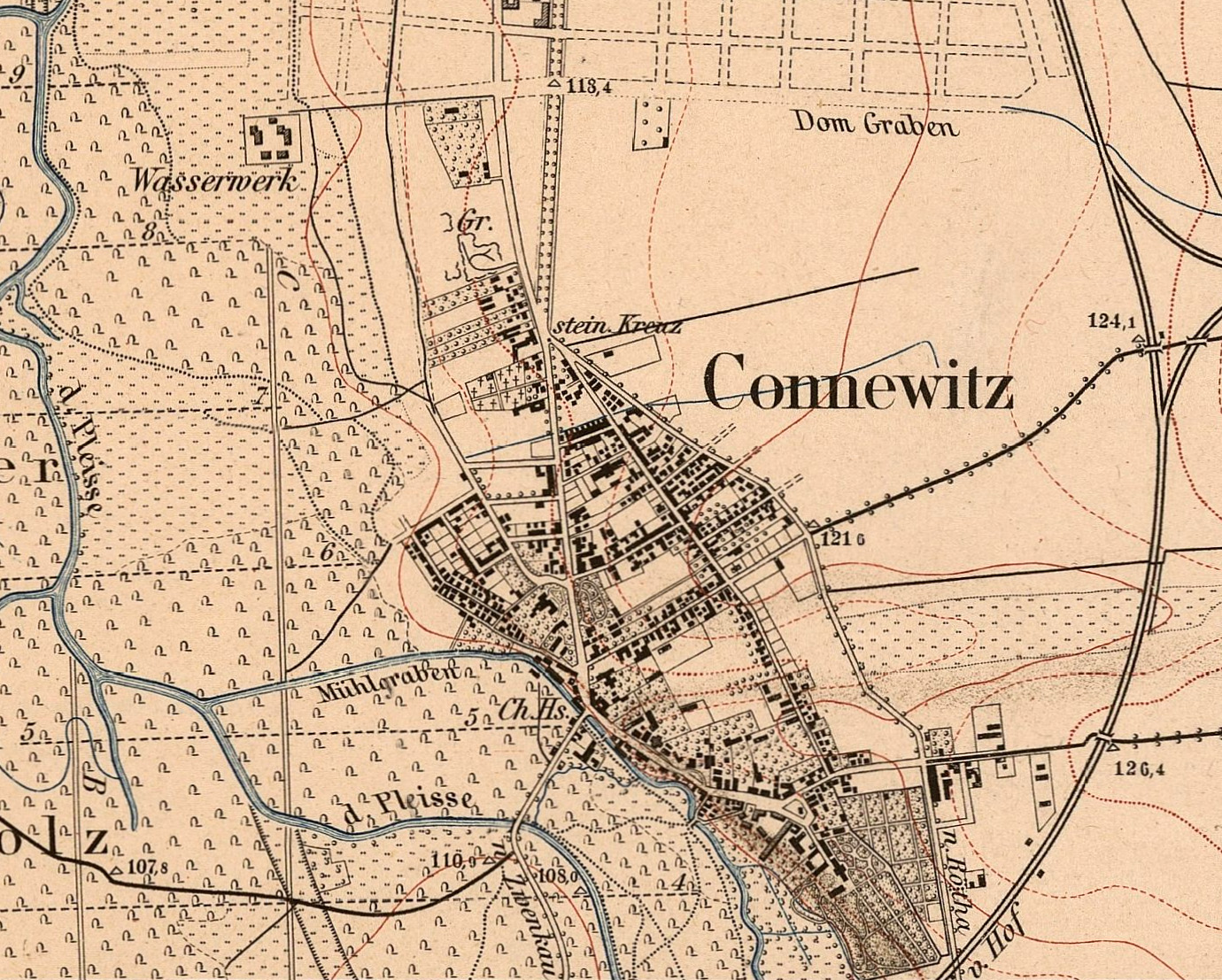
Connewitz on a map from 1879

There is evidence of a settlement on the site of the present village as far back as the Iron Age.

After the migration of peoples, Sorbian settlers founded the village of Connewitz (Old Sorbian: *Końovica or *Końovici = "horse place", "place where horses graze") probably after the seventh century. The center of the village was a rundling in the triangle of today's Prinz-Eugen-, Probstheidaer- and Biedermann Street. The village developed in a northwestern direction towards the edge of the Pleiße floodplain until it merged with the Sorbian settlement of Döbschütz (later the upper and lower villages) to form a long, cul-de-sac village. The Sorbian population was assimilated by the German settlers in the course of the German East settlement and the rural land take-over in a long process from about the eleventh century. In the upper part of the village, a manor house was established (ca. 1100 Knight of Kunawitz).

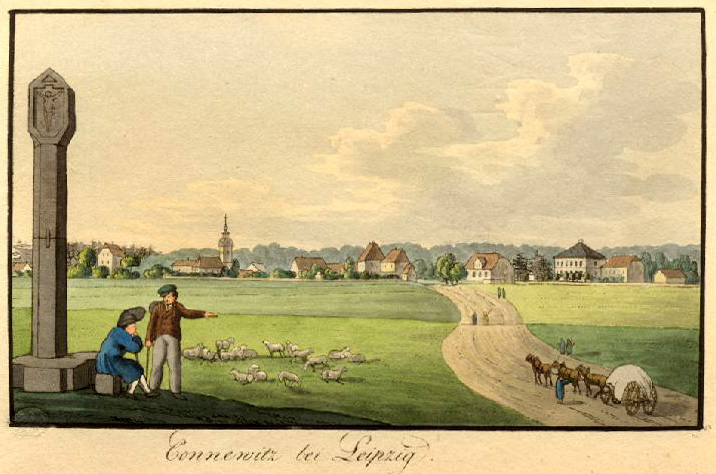
Connewitz around 1800

Between 1200 and 1250, the villages of Dölitz, Lößnig, and Connewitz jointly built the 4 km (2.5 mi) long Mühl ditches for the operation of their mills. In 1275/76 the Augustinian monastery in Leipzig acquired the manor and the rights to the Döbschütz mill. In the 15th century, it expanded its activities. A copper hammer and a grinder were added to the flour, oil, and spice mill. In 1496, the city of Leipzig erected a wooden cross at the fork north of Connewitz, which was replaced in 1536 by a stone column depicting a cross (Connewitz Cross). The surviving stone column from 1536 can be found in the Leipzig City History Museum.

After the Reformation, the Leipzig City Council acquired the Connewitz estate in 1543 and established four threshing estates in 1545. The village of Connewitz, which until the Reformation had belonged to the Chapel of the Holy Cross in Ölschwitz, was assigned to the parish of Probstheida. The Connewitz forester's office was established in 1563. Between 1619 and 1629, 17 farm workers' houses were built next to the mill, the new village of Connewitz, which separated from Connewitz in 1705, but "returned" in 1839. During the Thirty Years' War, there were several cases of looting and plundering when troops passed through. In 1755/56 the (old) cemetery of Connewitz was built near the cross and in 1770/71 a small late baroque church was built in the upper village on the Schulberg, which remained a filial church of Probstheida until 1875.

During the Battle of the Nations near Leipzig, troops from Napoleon's army barricaded themselves in Connewitz, which was severely damaged in the fierce fighting. At the beginning of the 19th century, wealthy Leipzig citizens discovered the beautiful location of Connewitz and built country houses here. In 1830, Schumann's "Lexicon of Saxony", continued by Albert Schiffner, stated that Connewitz was "one of the most beautiful villages in Saxony".

In 1839 Connewitz became an independent municipality with its council according to the Saxon Rural municipality regulations. Until 1856, the town was part of the Electoral Saxon or Royal Saxon District Office of Leipzig. From 1856 Connewitz belonged to the Court Office of Leipzig II and from 1875 to the District Administration of Leipzig. From 1859 to 1871 in the area between Bornaischer Street and today's Wolfgang-Heinze-Street and from 1865 to 1890 between Wolfgang-Heinze-Street and Neudörfchen. In 1877, the address book lists 310 residential buildings.

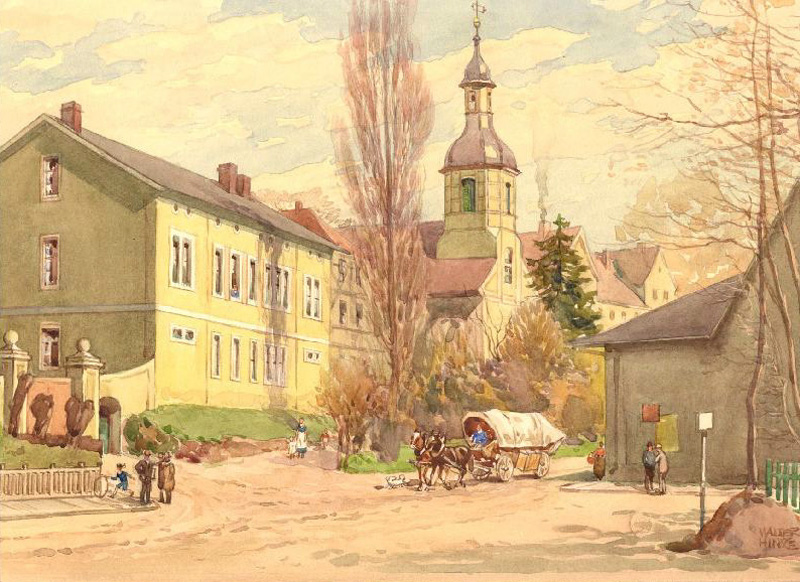
Village center with the old village church, watercolor by W. Hinze, 1901

In 1866, the waterworks for the city of Leipzig were put into operation at the western end of today's Richard-Lehmann Street. From 1887 it was gradually shut down due to the transition to overland supply. In 1868/69, the flood bed of the Pleiße was created for flood protection and the network of paths in the Connewitz Forest was laid out with hiking and riding trails. Street lighting with gas lamps began in 1872. In 1877, the Süd Street (today's Karl-Liebknecht-Strasse) was completed as a straight connection from the cross to the city of Leipzig. In 1880, the new Connewitz Cemetery was opened on Meusdorfer Street, which still exists today.

Finally, in 1891, Connewitz, now with a population of 1,0596, was consolidated into Leipzig along with five other town-like villages. The poverty-stricken village had been seeking incorporation since 1888 to share in Leipzig's economic growth. Before consolidation, the village was also known as Connewitz bei Leipzig.

=== Connewitz as a Leipzig district ===
The lively building activity continued after the consolidation, initially by extending the cross streets beyond Bornaische Street to the east and connecting them via Zwenkauer Street. The new church of Connewitz, today's Paul-Gerhardt-church, was consecrated on the site of the old cemetery in 1900. The old church was demolished two years later. From 1911 to 1914, about 60 houses with about 350 apartments were built each year in Connewitz.

The development of the Connewitz section of Süd street also began in 1913 with the Königlich-Sächsische Bauschule (now LUAS) and the Teutonia insurance building opposite it (later the Oberfinanzdirektion, then the Leipzig district headquarters of the SED, now an office complex). In 1926, the building of the Oberpostdirektion (now the Lipsius building of the LUAS) followed next door, i.e. all buildings that were important beyond Connewitz.

In 1913, the International Building Exhibition was held in Leipzig. For this purpose, 48 single-family houses, 14 semi-detached houses, and 10 apartment buildings were erected on the eastern Connewitz site, far from the Connewitz development, as the exhibition object of a garden city, the core of the later independent Leipzig district of Marienbrunn.

After a period of stagnation during and after World War I, residential construction in the northeastern part of Connewitz began in earnest in 1926. Residential buildings, some in the Art Deco style, were erected in and around today's Bernhard-Göring-, Richard-Lehmann-, Arthur-Hoffmann-, and Gustav-Freytag-Street. Between 1930 and 1940, the Eisenbahner-Baugenossenschaft Leipzig built 426 apartments, some in the New Objectivity style, on the newly laid out streets of Burgstädter, Kohrener, and Narsdorfer Street.

In 1926, the Waldbad Connewitz, which was closed again in 1989, was opened, and in 1927/28 Connewitz was given another access from the east with the construction of the Markthallenbrücke bridge and the embankment of today's Richard-Lehmann-Street.

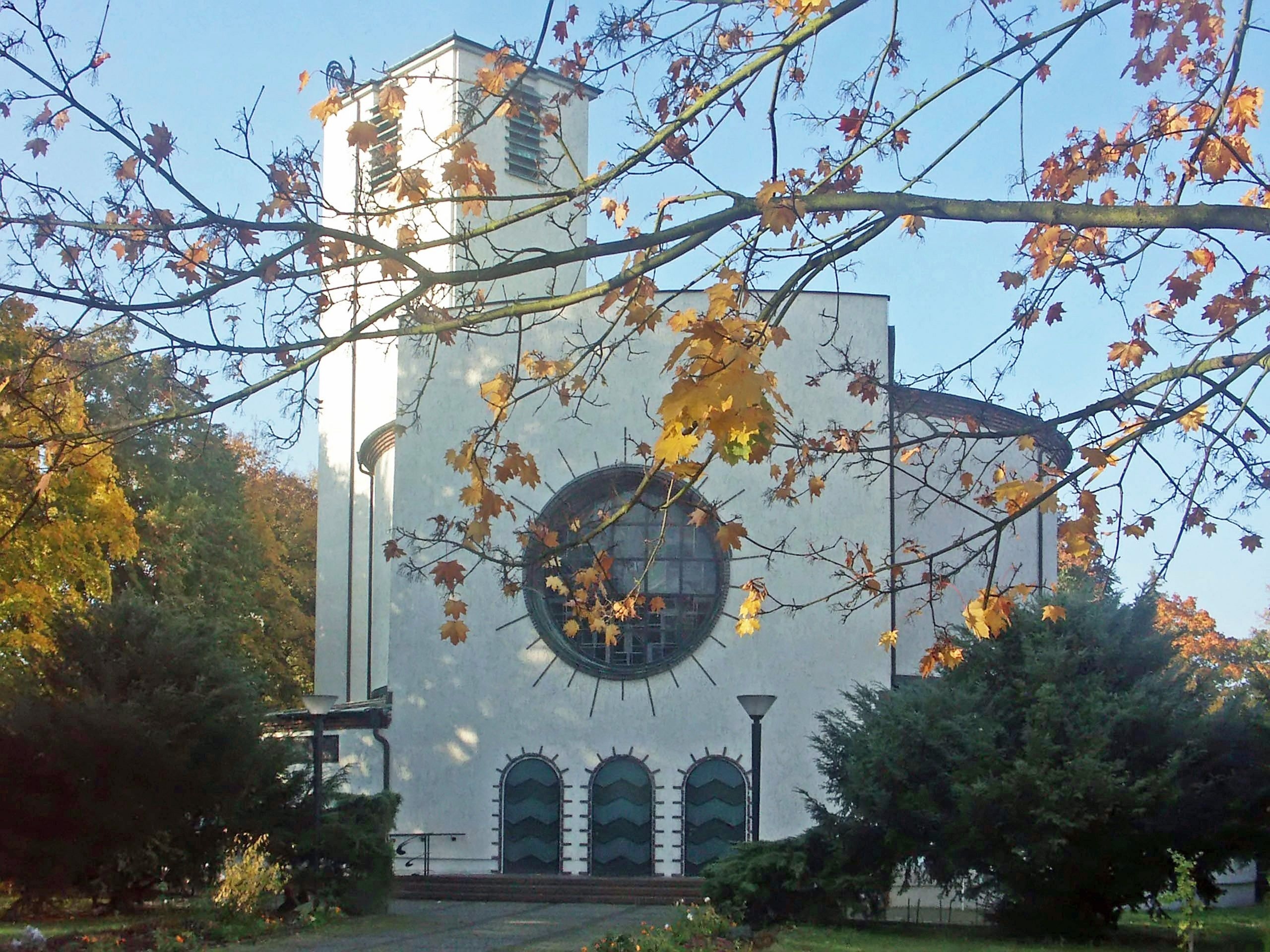
St.-Bonifatius Church

In 1930, St.-Bonifatius Church was built on Biedermann Street in memory of the Catholic merchants who died in the First World War. In 1931, the adjacent St. Elisabeth Hospital was opened. Another hospital was added in 1936, when the Villa Schomburgk on Prinz-Eugen-Street, built by Theodor Kösser in 1899, was used as the Bethanien Hospital, the first in-patient hospital in Saxony. Since 2014, the building has been an outpatient rehabilitation center of the Elisabeth Hospital.

The air raids on Leipzig during World War II caused considerable destruction in Connewitz. Nearly half of the residential buildings north of the cross, parts of Herder Street (including the school), Brand Street (Friedrichshallen entertainment center), and today's Wolfgang-Heinze-Street were affected, as well as the Connewitz Mill, the Wald-Café, the Zum Wassergott inn, and large parts of the gas works. On April 18, 1945, U.S. Army troops occupied the city, and after the Red Army took over on July 2, 1945, Leipzig became part of the Soviet occupation zone.

=== Connewitz 1945–1989 ===
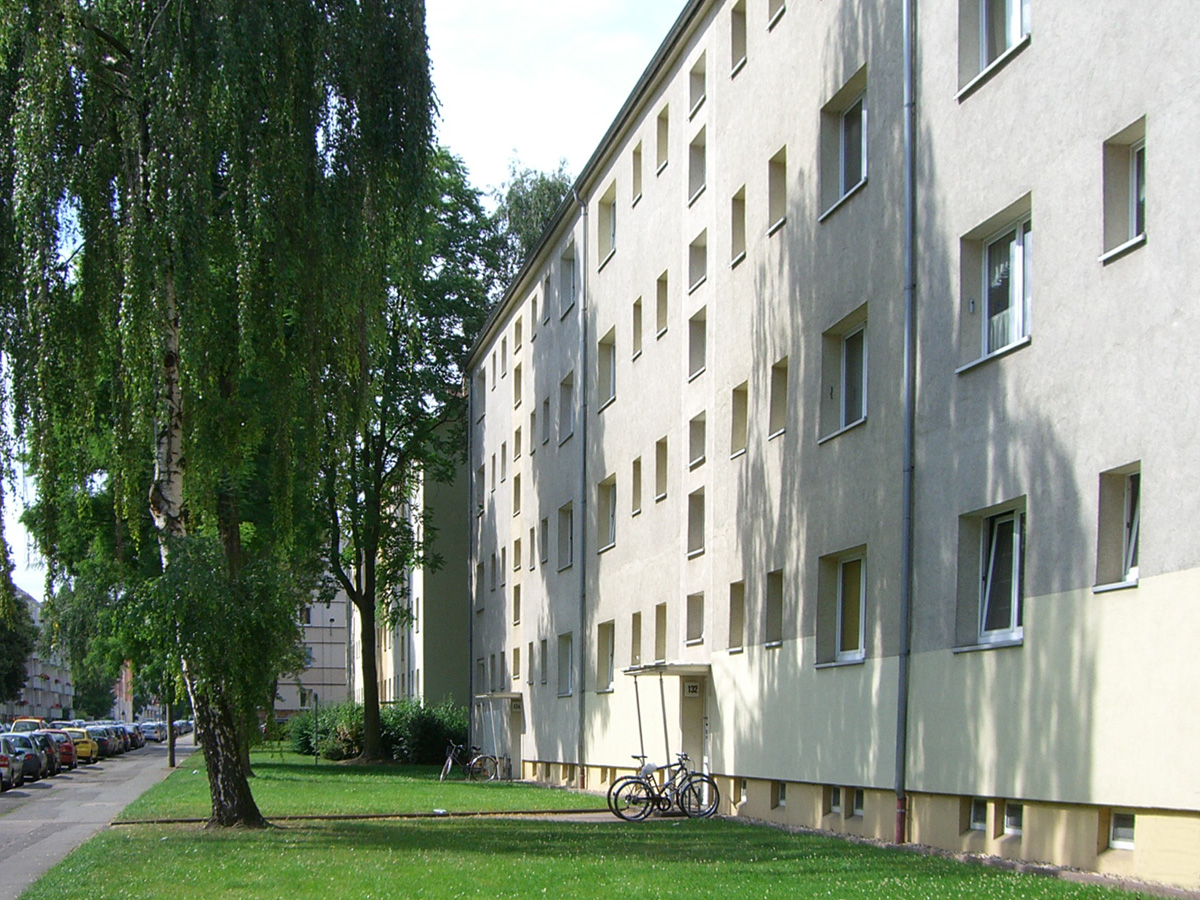
Residential buildings built around 1960 in Bernhard-Göring-Street

In the 1950s and early 1960s, after the wartime rubble had been cleared, attempts were made to fill in the gaps in the urban fabric. Predominantly four-story, mostly plain residential buildings were erected, for example on Brand Street and Windscheid Street, on Bernhard-Göring-Street and Richard-Lehmann-Street, and Hildebrandplatz. In 1953, the first phase of construction of the German Postal Engineering School began, and in 1958, the expansion of the Technical University (now LUAS).

In 1969, the department store at the cross and the indoor swimming pool in Arno-Nitzsche-Street was built, which was closed in 2004. In 1970, the student gym was opened next to the indoor pool.

From 1957 to 1962, the gasworks was significantly expanded to ensure Leipzig's gas supply. In 1977, the gas coking plant was shut down and the city's gas was supplied by the black pump gas combine until it was converted to natural gas. Between 1984 and 1987, a lignite-based combined heat and power plant was built on the site, but it ceased operation in 2004 for environmental reasons and was demolished, except for the furnace.

Due to the interruption of the F2 and F95 trunk roads by the lignite mines south of Leipzig, the new four-lane F2 was built in the early 1980s, which reached Leipzig via Markkleeberg through Connewitzer Holz at Wundt Street. This gave Connewitz direct access to the highway network with two slip roads.

The decay of the old building fabric, which could be found everywhere during the GDR era, was particularly noticeable in the old part of Connewitz around Biedermann Street. Large-scale demolition and replacement with large prefabricated buildings was therefore planned and had already begun when the events of 1989/90 (the first People's Building Conference) put an end to it for the time being.

=== Connewitz after 1989 ===
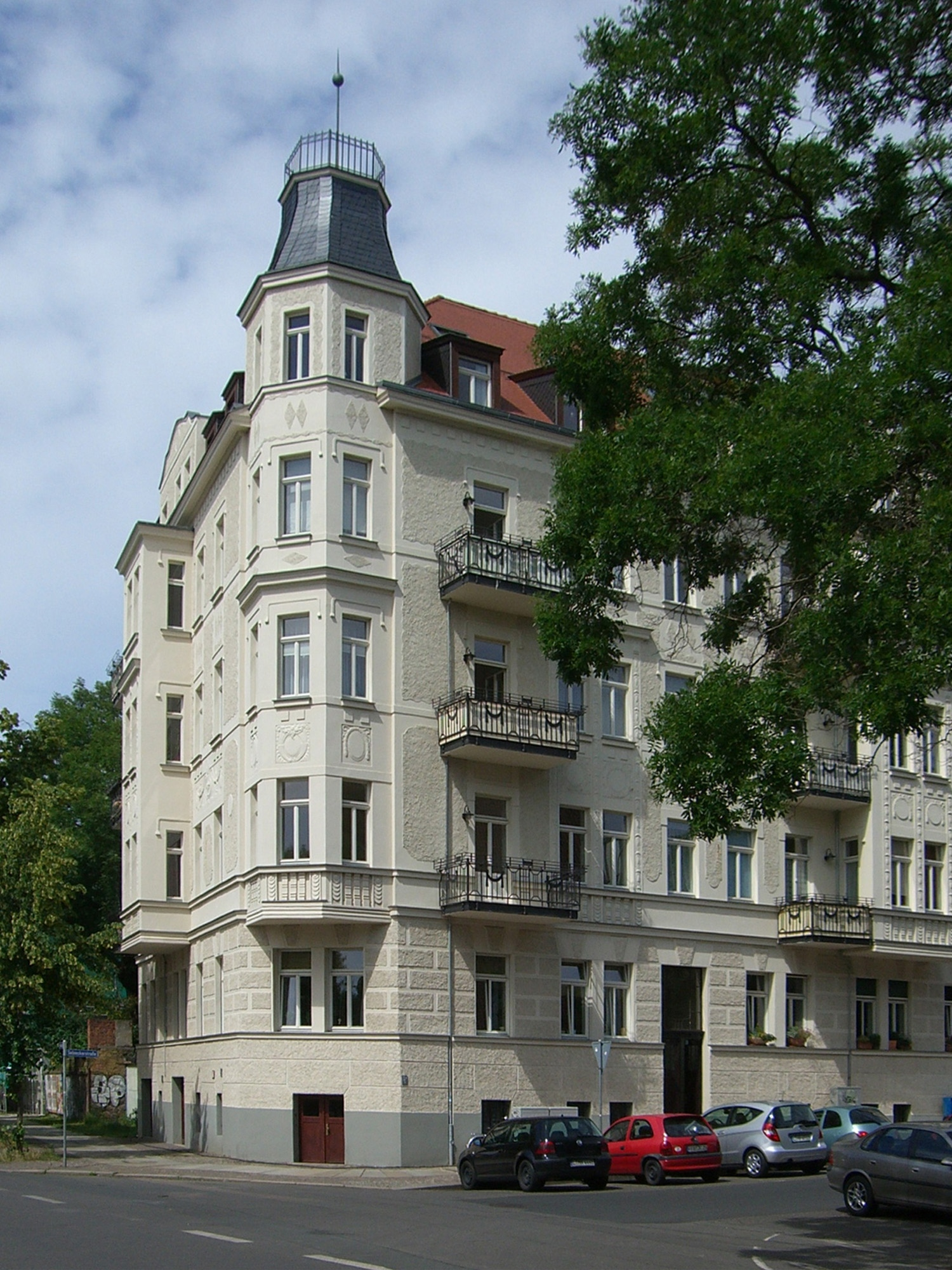
The renovated old building on the corner of Selnecker Street and Windscheid Street

In 1991, the area bounded by Wolfgang Heinze Street, Meusdorfer Street, and Bornaische Street was declared a redevelopment area (the first in Saxony to be formally defined and confirmed), where careful urban renewal is taking place. An emergency program in 1991 initially saved 33 houses from decay. Nevertheless, further construction was not possible without demolition. However, the new buildings were adapted to the Connewitz building typology. Care was also taken to ensure an appropriate social balance (senior housing next to townhouses for young families).

An alternative scene formed with squats in initially unrenovated houses in Alt-Connewitz. Clashes and violent confrontations with the police occur regularly on special occasions such as May Day and New Year's Eve. The situation with the squatters was defused when the former squatters founded an alternative housing cooperative, Connewitz e.G., which was financed by the city. The Connewitz community of interests, founded in April 1998 by residents, investors, and merchants, works to improve the image of Connewitz.

On January 11, 2016, about 250 neo-Nazis and hooligans attacked Connewitz. Armed with iron bars, axes and pyrotechnics, they attacked people and businesses and destroyed cars and residential buildings. The damage caused amounted to 113,000 euros. 215 of the participants were arrested. The judicial process has been slow. The first conviction was handed down in August 2018. Five years after the attack, 66 defendants still had no trial date.

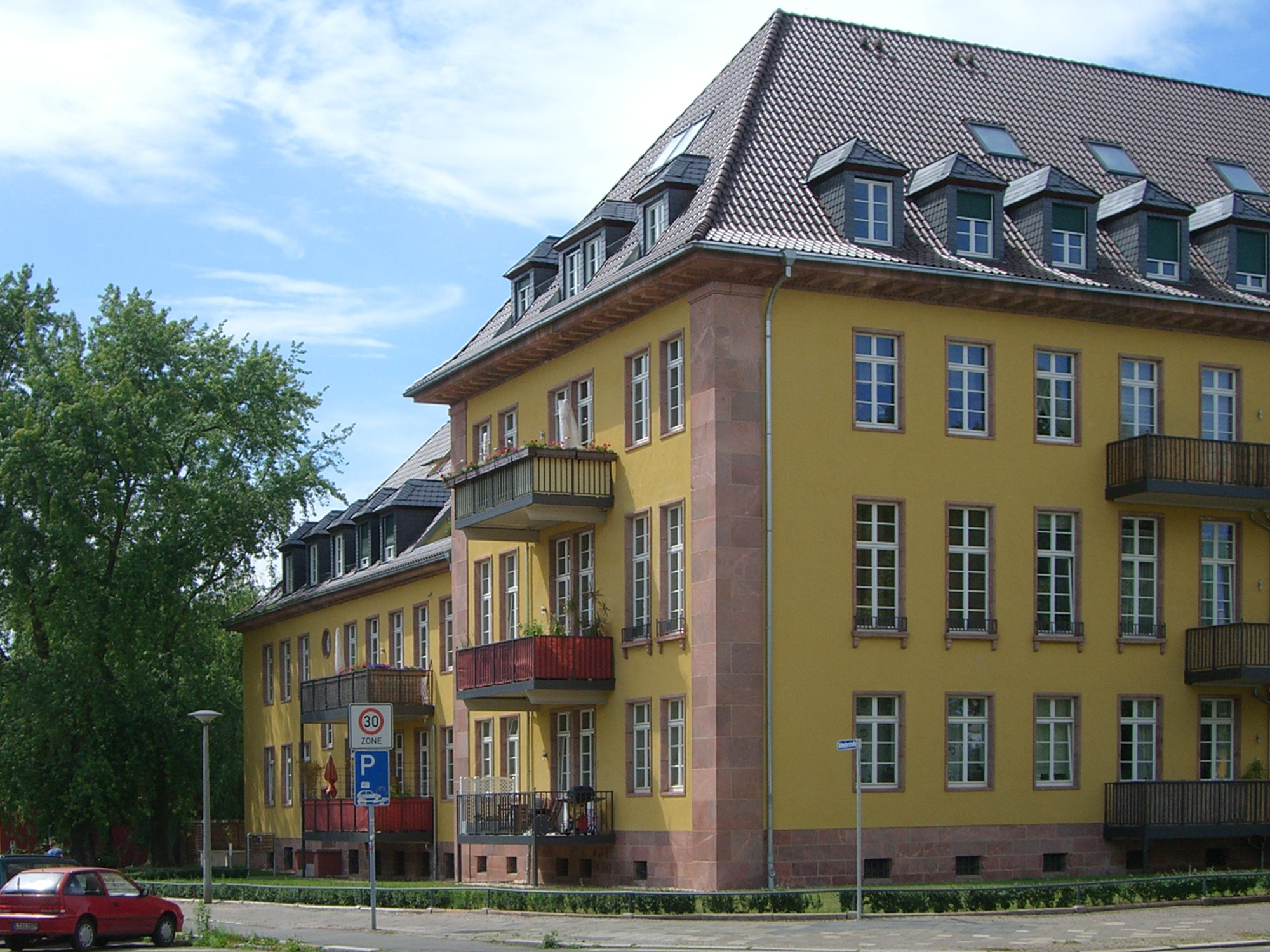
Former barracks in Windscheid Street

In the majority of Connewitz, residential buildings have been renovated or reconstructed, bringing back the beauty of the Gründerzeit houses, but also significantly improving the living comfort in old and GDR buildings. New residential areas were also developed (Untere Eckstein Street), and entire streets with dilapidated old buildings were renovated and supplemented with new buildings (Ernesti Street, Teich Street). Another property is the former barracks building on Windscheid Street, built in 1939 for the Army High Command 10 under Walter von Reichenau and his then Chief of Staff Friedrich Paulus, which was used by the Red Army after 1945. It has since been converted into a residential complex and the rest of the site has been developed with detached houses.

New buildings for the Sparkasse and the AOK were erected near the Connewitz intersection. The two universities in Connewitz and the Elisabeth Hospital were considerably expanded. The few remaining industrial plants in Connewitz were closed after the Peaceful Revolution. For more information on their conversion to cultural, residential, and commercial uses, see the industry section.

The House of Democracy in Bernhard-Göring-Street gained significance beyond Connewitz after the Peaceful Revolution. Built in 1903 as an orphanage, it served as an apprentice home, a military hospital, and a children's home until it was destroyed in World War II. After its reconstruction, it was used as a design office from 1952 until the SED city government moved in in 1983. Since 1990, it has been run by the House of Democracy Leipzig e.V. and is home to numerous associations and initiatives. The list of tenants and members of the building contains 50 names (2009) and ranges from environmental institutions (e.g. the Leipzig Environmental Library), education and culture (Leipzig Teachers Association e.V.), social affairs, senior citizens and politics (South Municipal Advisory Council) to the dance café Ilse's Erika and the cinema bar Prager Frühling.

In 1992, the administrative structure of Leipzig was reorganized. Connewitz is now one of the 63 subdivisions called "Ortsteile" of Leipzig, roughly within its old boundaries, except for Fockeberg, which is now part of the south suburb, and the area of Marienbrunn, which became an independent neighbourhood.

== Population ==
Year	Inhabitants
1818	380
1834	931
1844	1,550
1875	5,653
1890	10,596

Year	Inhabitants
1900	15,030
1910	24,257
1925	28,600
1981	19,703
1992	13,981

Year	Inhabitants
2000	13,819
2005	15,554
2010	17,010
2015	18,487
2020	19,337
2023	19,798

== Politics ==
The Municipal District Advisory Council of the Municipal District South is responsible for Connewitz as for the other districts of the Municipal District. Its eleven members are elected by the City Council after each municipal election on the recommendation of the parties represented in the City Council. The meetings of the District Council South take place in the House of Democracy in Connewitz.

Connewitz is part of the electoral district Leipzig 2 for the elections to the Saxon Parliament and part of the electoral district Leipzig II (electoral district 153) for the elections to the German parliament.

The 2021 German federal election produced the following second election result with a voter turnout of 82.4%:

Partei	Connewitz	Stadt Leipzig
The Left	28,4%	13,7%
Alliance 90/The Greens	26,1%	18,5%
SPD	16,7%	20,9%
CDU	8,6%	14,0%
AfD	5,4%	13,3%
FDP	5,4%	10,1%
Other	9,3%	9,5%

Connewitz is known nationwide as a stronghold of the left-wing and alternative scene and is often associated with punks, autonomists, Antifa, Antideutsch, and the squatter scene. However, these make up only a small minority of the Connewitz population and are mainly concentrated in the so-called Bermuda Triangle between Bornaischer, Meusdorfer, and Wolfgang-Heinze-Street. Important meeting places for this extremely heterogeneous scene are linXXnet, which is run by the Left Party, and the alternative cultural center Conne Island.

== Places of interest ==
=== Connewitz Cross ===
A stone column with a cross at the southern end of Karl-Liebknecht-Street was erected in 1536 as a symbol of Leipzig's soft picture. A copy has been standing at this location since 1994. The original is in the Leipzig Museum of City History. (Picture at the top of the article)

Panometer

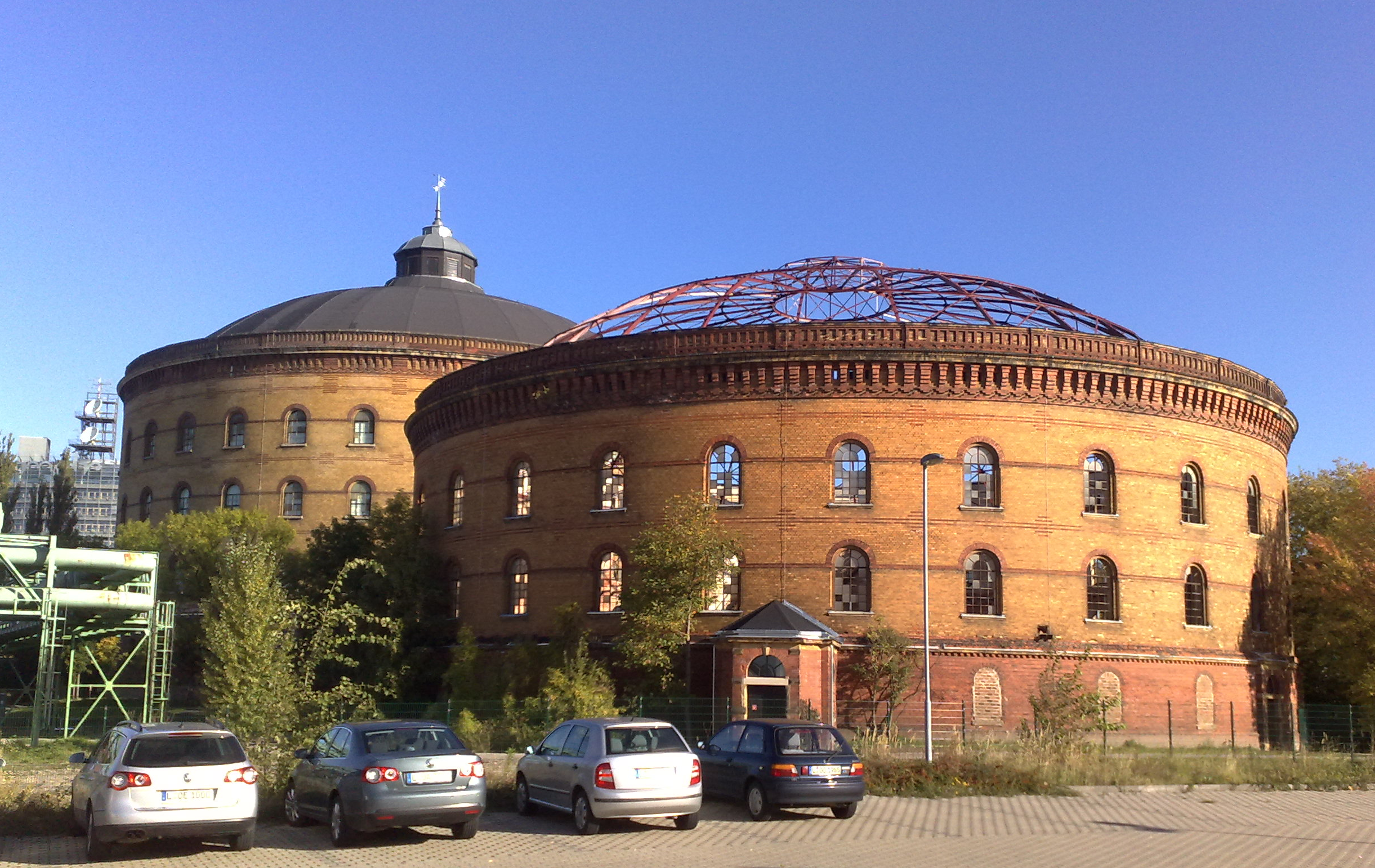
Panometer

Leipzig Panometer (a portmanteau of "panorama" and "gasometer") in Richard-Lehmann-Street. The artist Yadegar Asisi has combined the old technique of panoramic images in an abandoned gas holder building of the Leipzig public utilities with today's technical possibilities. In the Leipzig Panometer, the largest panoramic images in the world are shown on an area of around 100 m (328.1 ft) x 30 m (98.4 ft), each linked to themed exhibitions. After an image of Mount Everest (2003–2005), a depiction of Rome in the year 312 (2005–2009), and a view of the Brazilian rainforest ("Amazonia", 2009–2013), Leipzig after the Battle of the Nations in 1813 was on display from August 2013 to September 2015. The Great Barrier Reef panorama was on display from October 2015 to January 2017. Since then, the Titanic panorama has been on display.

=== Paul-Gerhardt Church ===
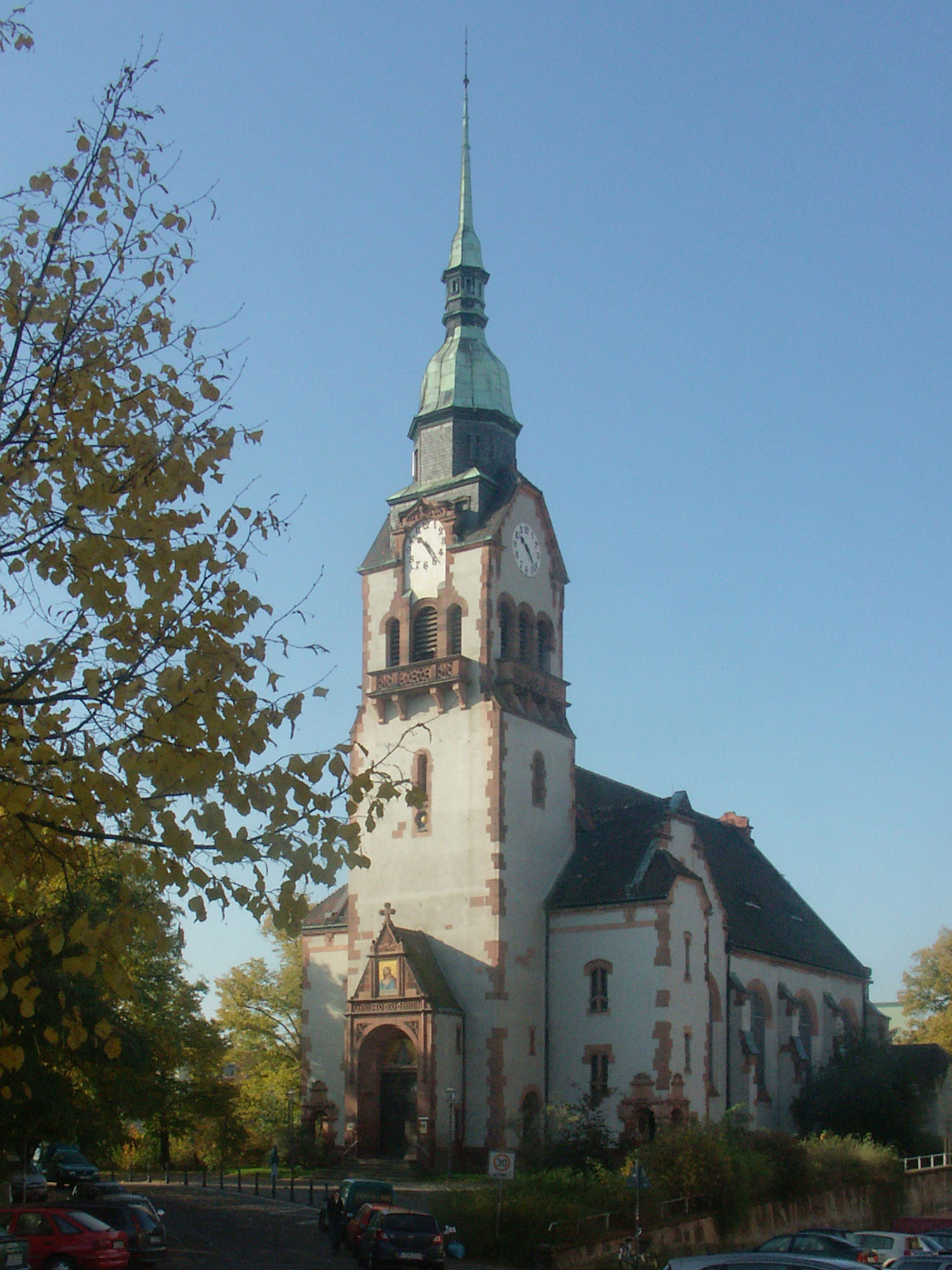
Paul-Gerhard Church

The Paul-Gerhardt Church near the Connewitz Cross is one of the two churches of the Evangelical Lutheran parish of Leipzig-Connewitz-Lößnig. The building, designed by architect Julius Zeißig in 1900 in the style of the German Renaissance, has a 60 m (196.9 ft) tall tower on its eastern entrance side. The interior, which seats 650, is covered by a wooden barrel vault with ornamental paintings. Each of the stained glass windows, created in 1954, refers to a hymn by the hymn writer Paul Gerhardt, whose name the church has borne since 1934. (Illustration in the section Connewitz as a district of Leipzig)

=== St.-Bonifatius Church ===
St.-Bonifatius Church at the southern end of Biedermannstrasse is considered one of the most important Catholic church buildings in Germany between the two world wars. Designed by architect Theo Burlage, it is a round Art Deco church with a flat, gilded dome and an important late Expressionist interior (terracotta figures).

=== Leipzig Wildlife Park ===
In the Leipzig Wildlife Park (in German: Wildpark Leipzig) in the southern part of the Connewitz floodplain forest, around 40 species of native Central European animals can be observed in near-natural enclosures on an area of 42 ha (103.8 acres) with free admission.

== Culture ==
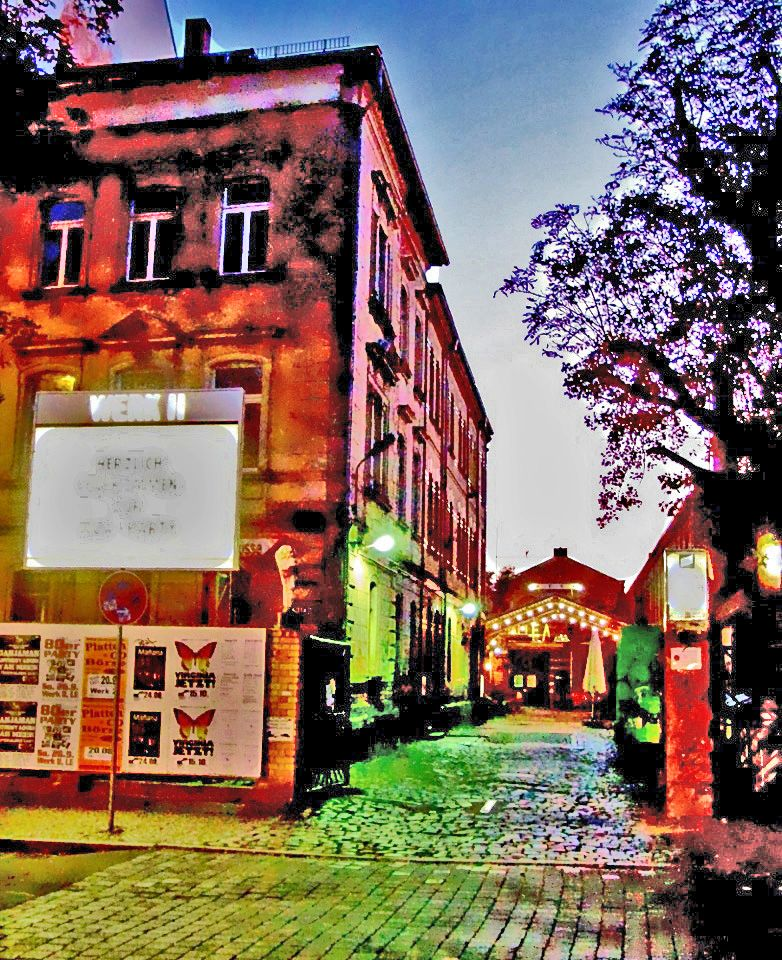
Werk II

Werk II makes an important contribution to the cultural life of Connewitz. It is a socio-cultural center located on the site of the former Werk II of the VEB Material testing machines Leipzig directly at the Connewitz Cross. It offers courses and club activities (e.g. ceramics, glass blowing, graphic printing, computer club for seniors), and contains artists' studios and offices for cultural groups and associations. In a hall of 1,000 m^{2} (10,763.9 sq ft), a wide range of events is offered, from discos to concerts of internationally renowned bands, for which the catchment area covers the entire city.

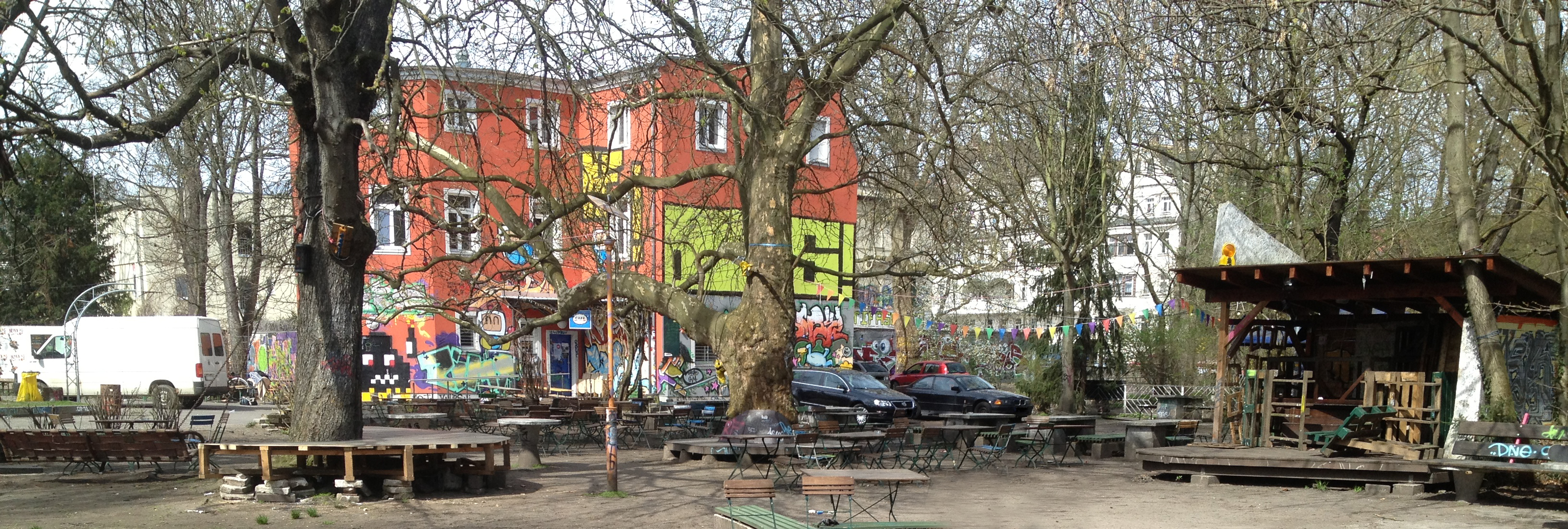
Conne Island

Werk II is also home to the off-theater Leipzig Chamber. The Chamber is the smallest theater in the city. The action on the Chamber stage is almost close enough to touch. The plays are developed and performed by experienced directors and actors from Leipzig's independent scene. The Chamber also gives guest performances in other venues and is an essential part of Leipzig's independent scene.

In addition to Werk II, the UT Connewitz has established itself in recent years as a venue for concerts, film screenings, and other events aimed at an alternative scene audience. The building, located in a courtyard with direct access to the street, is the oldest cinema in Leipzig (1912). Since 2001, it has been run by the UT Connewitz e. V. association, which saved it from decay.

Trendy pubs and clubs, such as the Conne Island youth cultural center, the Waldfrieden Connewitz culture industry and Ilses Erika in the House of Democracy, also cater to a largely alternative audience with a diverse range of events.

== Economy and infrastructure ==
=== Industry ===
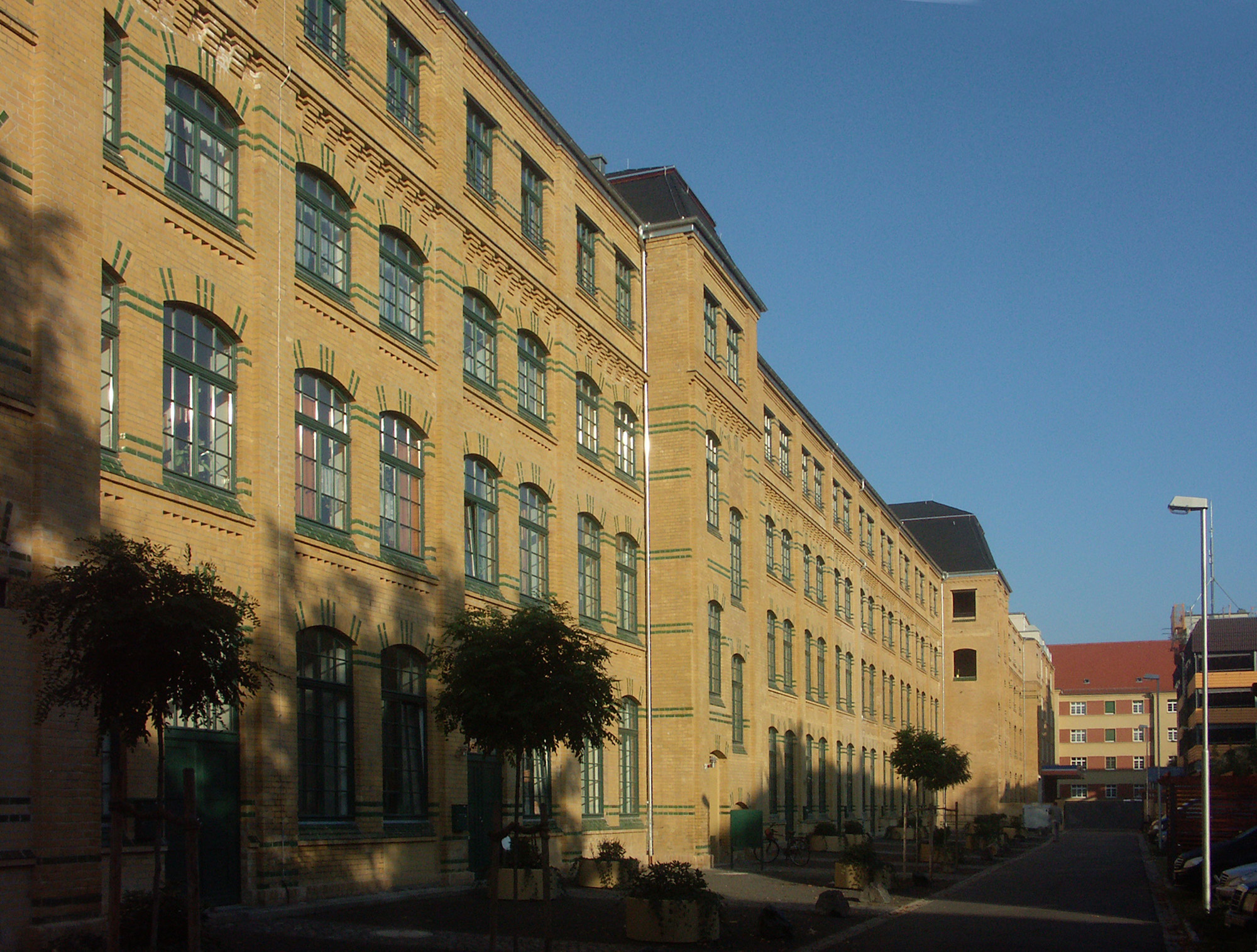
"Südcenter" in the former vehicle transmission plant

As in all districts of Leipzig, craft businesses and small trades developed in the courtyards of the Wilhelminian-style buildings, some of which still exist today.

In contrast to the western districts of Leipzig, for example, only a few industrial enterprises were established in Connewitz. These included a brewery in Biedermann Street (later Kronen-Brewery Bruno Ermisch) in 1875, the gasworks from 1882 to 1885 with later extensions (1984-1987: additional construction of a combined heat and power plant), a factory for gas measuring instruments and an iron foundry at the Kreuz (later VEB Material testing machines Leipzig). Gustav Edmund Reinhardt founded a letterpress, metal utensil, and machine factory in 1897 on what was then Waisenhaus Street, which has been called Arno-Nitzsche-Street since 1949. The former G. E. Reinhardt, letterpress, utensil, and lining machine factory at Arno-Nitzsche-Street 19 was merged with Köllmann gear manufacturing in Liebertwolkwitz in 1958 to form VEB Automotive gearboxes "Joliot-Curie", which was subordinated to VEB IFA-Combine Industriewerke Ludwigsfelde from 1978.

Except for the gasworks, all of these businesses were located in residential areas, so after the Peaceful Revolution and the subsequent closures, most of these commercial properties could easily be used for other purposes: The site of the VEB Material testing machines became the culture factory Werk II, and a residential park was built on the site of the demolished brewery. As a technical monument, the former G.E. Reinhardt (VEB Vehicle transmission factory) was converted into the "Südcenter," a residential complex with integrated offices, a fitness center, and a discount supermarket. As a result, Connewitz has virtually no major industrial facilities, except for the site of the former gasworks and the now-demolished cogeneration plant, where the municipal utilities temporarily store and distribute natural gas. Other companies also use the area. These include the Asisi factory in the Panometer and the DVB-T television antenna on the chimney of the former heating plant.

In the east of Connewitz, behind the Connewitz cemetery on Köhraer Street and Threnaer Street, a kind of business park has developed, consisting of craftsmen and service providers.

Retail in Connewitz is concentrated on the main streets leading from the Cross. In addition, there are now four discount supermarkets that are spread out a bit.

=== Traffic ===
In the Middle Ages, the Via Imperii trade route from Leipzig to Nuremberg passed through the village of Connewitz. Later, a post road ran along this route. Today, Koch Street and Bornaische Street follow this route. With the construction of the highway from Probstheida to Magdeborn in the first half of the 19th century (later F95), this route lost its importance for long-distance traffic. Today, Connewitz has access to long-distance traffic via the Bundes Street 2 highway with access points at Richard Lehmann Street and Wolfgang-Heinze-Street.

In 1861, a horse-drawn omnibus line was opened between Leipzig and Connewitz. In 1872, when three horse-drawn tram lines were opened in Leipzig, one of them went to Connewitz. The Connewitz line was also the first when the horse-drawn streetcar lines were electrified to form the "Blue" streetcar in April 1896. In 1900, the Leipzig outside track AG (LAAG) was founded, whose line, marked with a star, ran via Connewitz to Gautzsch (Markkleeberg-West).

In the city center, the most important streets in Connewitz today are Karl-Liebknecht Street, Bornaische Street, and Wolfgang-Heinze Street. They are served by tram lines 9, 10, and 11 and the bus lines 70, 79, 89, and 107 of the Leipzig Transport Authority.

Connewitz is touched by the Leipzig-Hof railway line. Although the Leipzig-Altenburg section of this line was opened in 1842, the Connewitz station was not built until 1888. In the same year, the single-track Connewitz-Plagwitz connecting line through the Auenwald forest, which was used only for freight traffic, was completed, but service was discontinued in 1925. Today, the Connewitz station is used for S-Bahn services.

=== Education ===
==== Schools ====
To date, seven schools have been built in Connewitz. Three of them still exist today as general education schools. (see table)

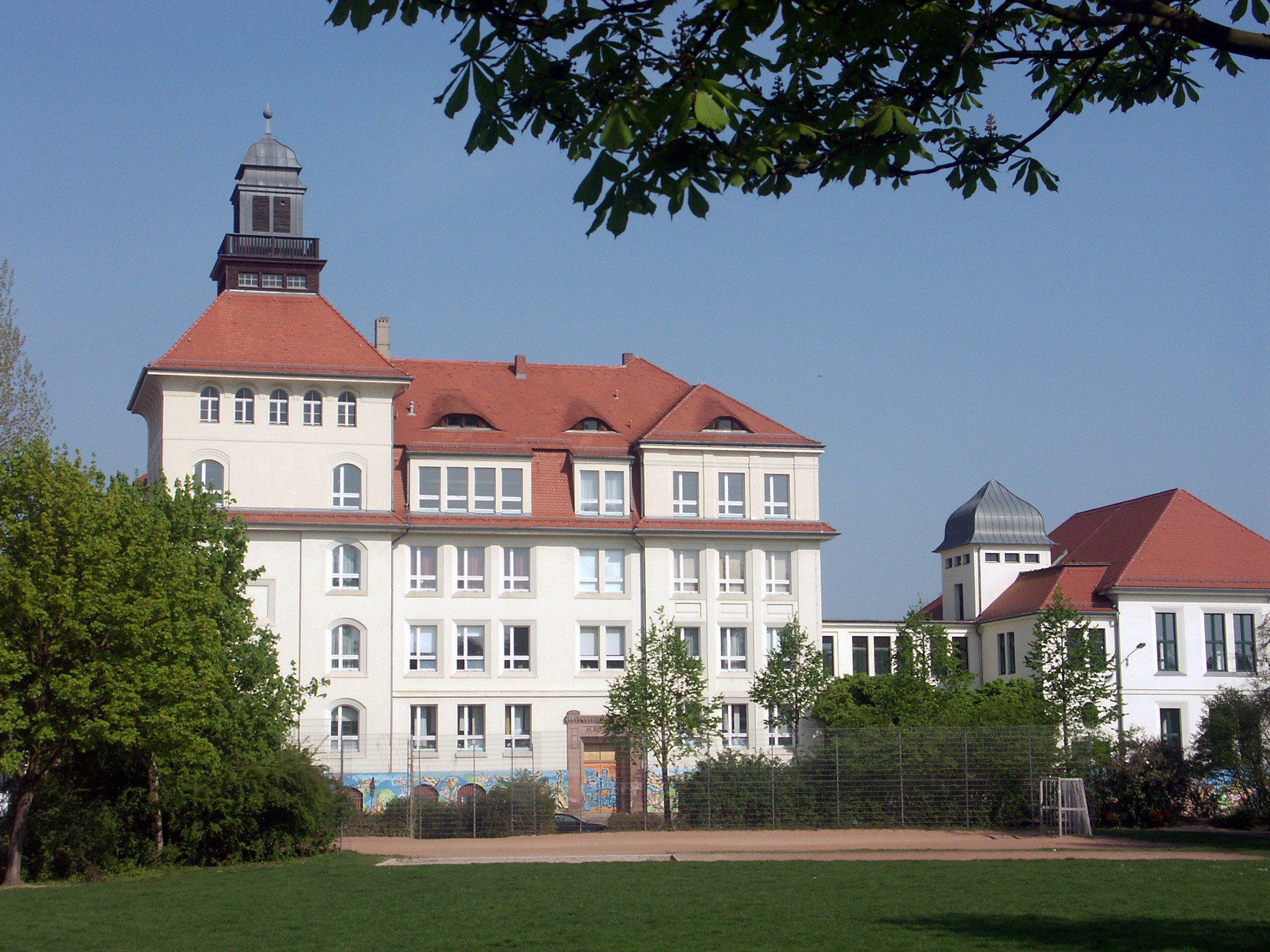
54th school on Hildebrand Street

Constructed	Location	Development
1729	Prinz-Eugen Street („Schulberg“)	Teachers' apartment with classroom, replaced in 1852
1852	Prinz-Eugen Street („Schulberg“)	first Connewitz school, today a residential building
1865	Brand Street / Ecke Basedow Street	Destroyed in the Second World War, today residential buildings
1880	Herder Street	Destroyed in the Second World War, now a playground
1898	Arno-Nitzsche Street (Waisenhausstr.)	XIV Public school, 1948 Herder school, since 2007 Apollonia-von-Wiedebach-School - Secondary school (until mid-2013 Middle school)
1904	Bornaische Street	7th elementary school, from 1977 POS Karl Jungbluth, 1992–2006 Theodor-Mommsen-school, Gymnasium, 2006–2011 Vocational school center 2, since 2013 Louise-Otto-Peters-school, High school
1914	Zwenkauer Street / Hildebrand Street	V. Public school, 1948 54th Elementary school, later 54th Polytechnic Secondary School, 1992 Middle- and Elementary school, since 2005 exclusively elementary school 54th school - elementary school, 2010 renamed to Connewitz school - elementary school of the city of Leipzig
1931	Hildebrand Street	Rudolf Hildebrand Secondary School for Girls, destroyed in the Second World War, now a school sports ground and playground

==== Universities ====
Leipzig University of Applied Sciences (LUAS) is located in northern Connewitz.

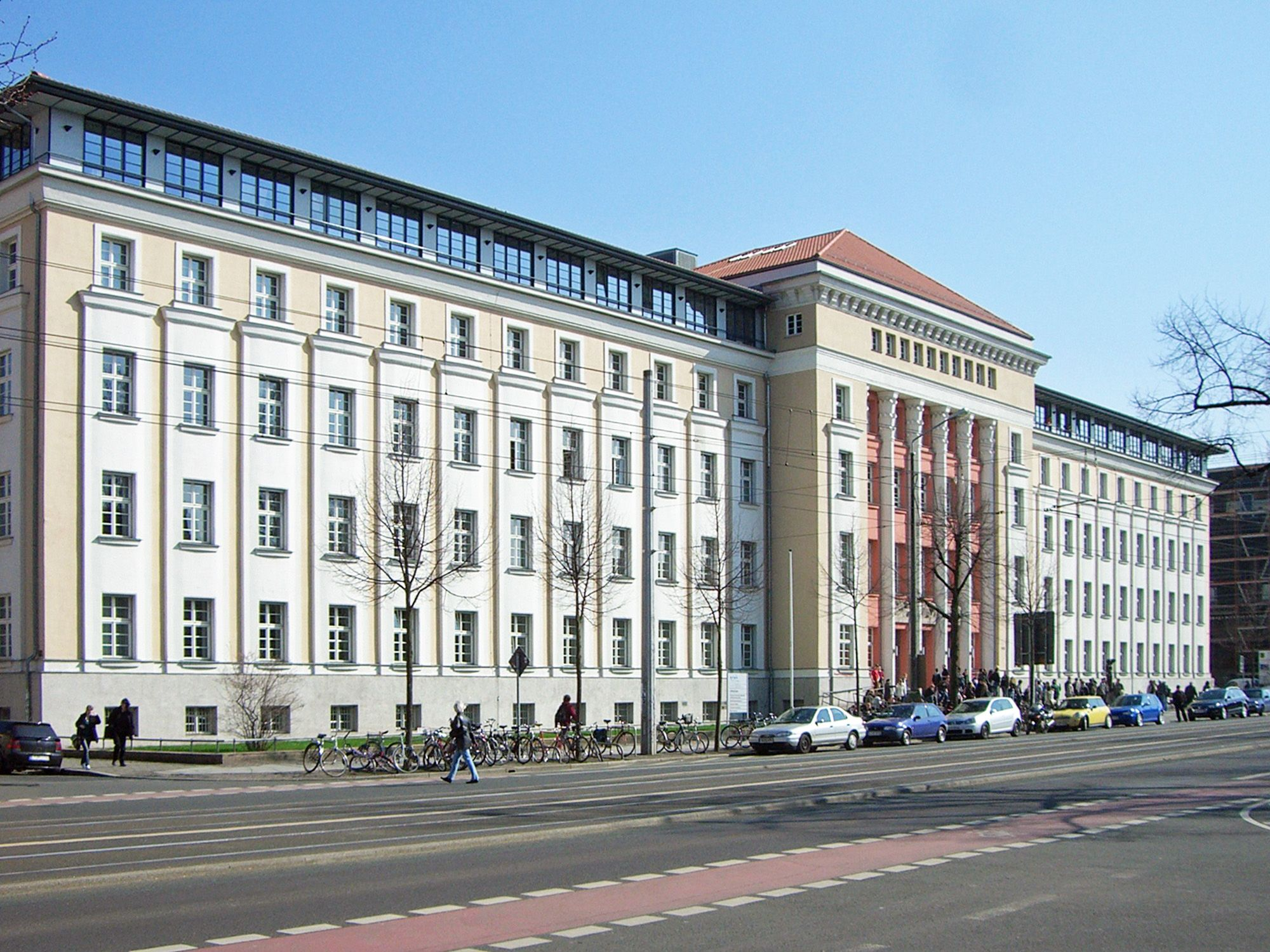
LUAS - Lipsius Building

The LUAS was founded in its current form in 1992 by various universities and technical colleges. It is the largest university of applied sciences in Saxony. It has over 6000 students enrolled in the fields of Civil Engineering, Electrical Engineering, Information Technology, Computer Science, Mechanical and Energy Engineering, Media, Social Sciences and Economics. Although some buildings are located in other districts, the central facilities, such as the Rector's Office, the University Library, and the Cafeteria, as well as most of the technical programs, are located on the Connewitz campus. The individual buildings are the Geutebrück building (former School of Architecture), the Lipsius building (former administrative building of the General Postal Directorate or district council during the GDR era), the Föppl building (new laboratory building), the Zuse building, the Gutenberg building, the new media center, the university library, an administrative building in Eichendorff Street, and the new laboratory building in Gustav-Freytag-Street. The university's sports hall in Arno-Nitzsche Street is also part of Connewitz. The newest building on campus is the Nieper Building of the Faculty of Mechanical and Energy Engineering, which opened in 2015.

The University of Applied Sciences for Telecommunications Leipzig (HfTL) of Deutsche Telekom was located on Gustav-Freytag Street. It emerged in 1991 from the Leipzig School of Engineering of the German Federal Post Office Telekom, which was created in the course of reunification by taking over the "Rosa Luxemburg" School of Engineering of the German Post in the GDR. It was one of the first Universities of Applied Sciences in the Free State of Saxony. In 2007, the university was renamed to University of Applied Sciences for Telecommunications Leipzig (FH). It was privately run by Deutsche Telekom. More than 500 students were enrolled in direct or dual study programs. The university was closed at the end of 2022 after all enrolled students had completed their studies. The buildings were transferred to the University of Applied Sciences for Technology, Economics, and Culture, where a Faculty of Digital Transformation was created and endowed by Deutsche Telekom.

==== Libraries ====
In addition to the libraries of the two universities, the Leipzig Environmental Library in the House of Democracy on Bernhard-Göring Street is particularly worthy of mention. It was founded in 1988 by the Environmental Protection Working Group of the Leipzig Youth Council. Since 1990 it has been run by the association Eco-lion - Leipzig Environmental Association. With 18,000 media (books, brochures, CD-ROMs, videos, games, posters, slides, maps and plans) it is one of the largest public environmental libraries in Germany under independent sponsorship.

=== Health and care ===
==== Healthcare ====
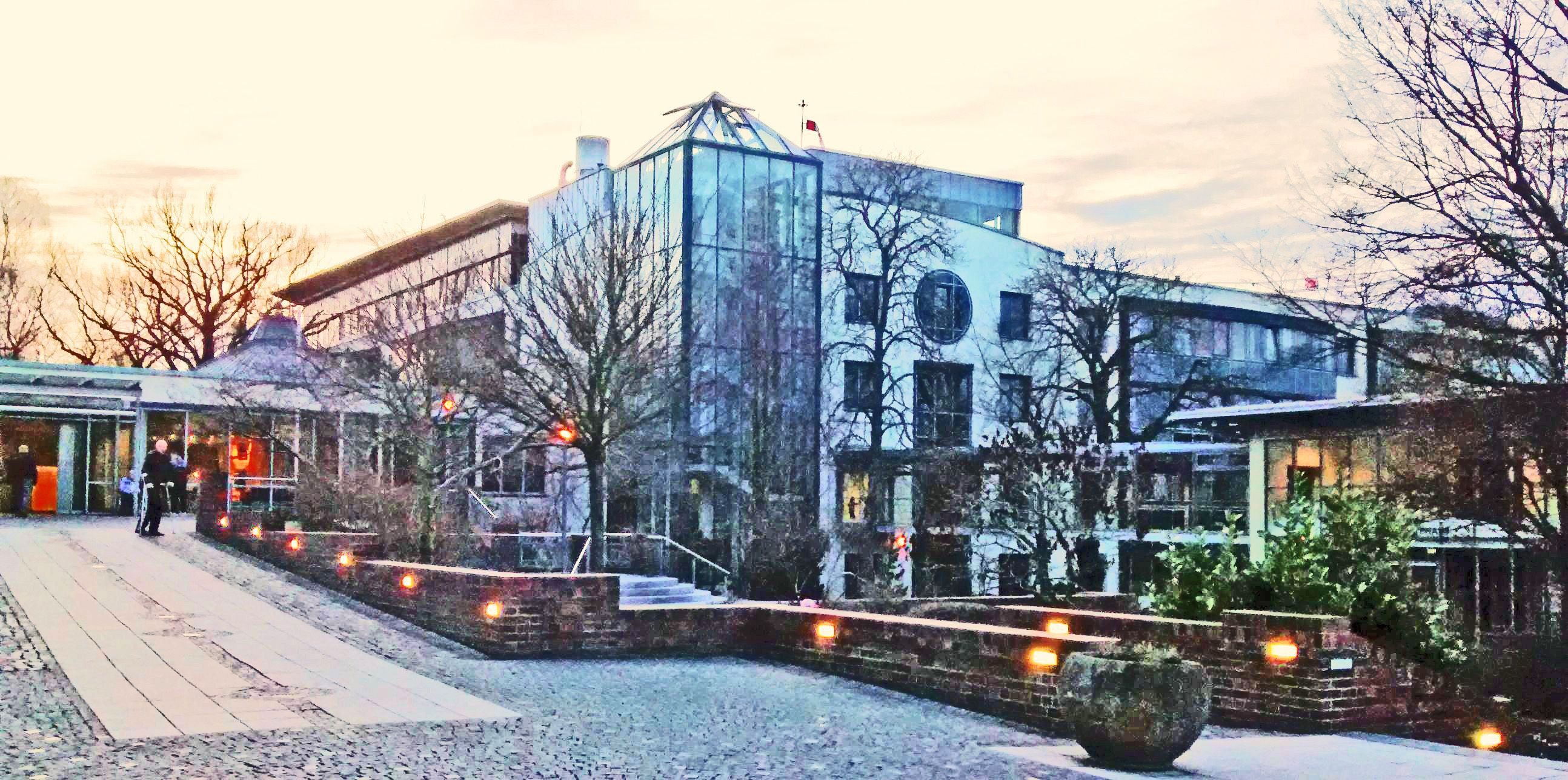
Newer part of the St. Elisabeth Hospital

The population of Connewitz has access to 33 registered doctors, including 5 general practitioners, for health care (as of 2015). There are four pharmacies in Connewitz.

The St. Elisabeth Hospital, founded in 1931 and run by the Catholic Church, is an important institution not only for Connewitz. It was significantly expanded after the fall of the Berlin Wall. In 2022, 19,374 patients were treated as inpatients, and 11,151 operations were performed.

==== Childcare ====
The first kindergarten in Connewitz was opened in 1912 as a "Childcare center" on Meusdorfer Street. There is still a kindergarten there today. There are a total of nine childcare facilities in Connewitz in the form of kindergartens, nurseries, or combined facilities run by various organizations.

==== Nursing and elderly care ====
Nursing homes and forms of assisted living are considered here as forms of support for people in need of care and the elderly. The "Angelika-Stift" nursing home in Bornaische Street is a nursing home in Connewitz. It was built in 1887, renovated in 1997 and extended by a new building. It offers 179 care places.

There are three assisted living facilities in Connewitz. They contain a total of 310 apartments and are located in new buildings constructed in 1998/99 and old buildings renovated in 1999 and 2001.

=== Sport and recreation ===
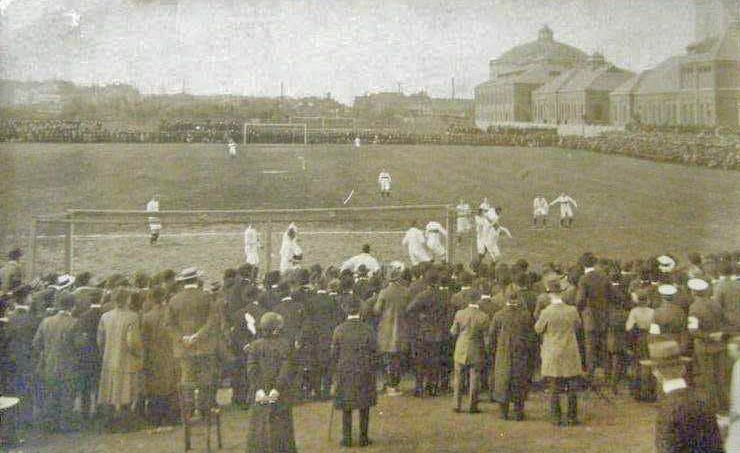
Sports Park Connewitz (1914)

In the 1900s, a sports ground with standing room for up to 25,000 spectators was built on Waisenhaus Street (now Arno-Nitzsche-Street ) next to the gasworks, the Connewitz Sports Park, which was used by FC Sportfreunde Leipzig and existed until 1942.

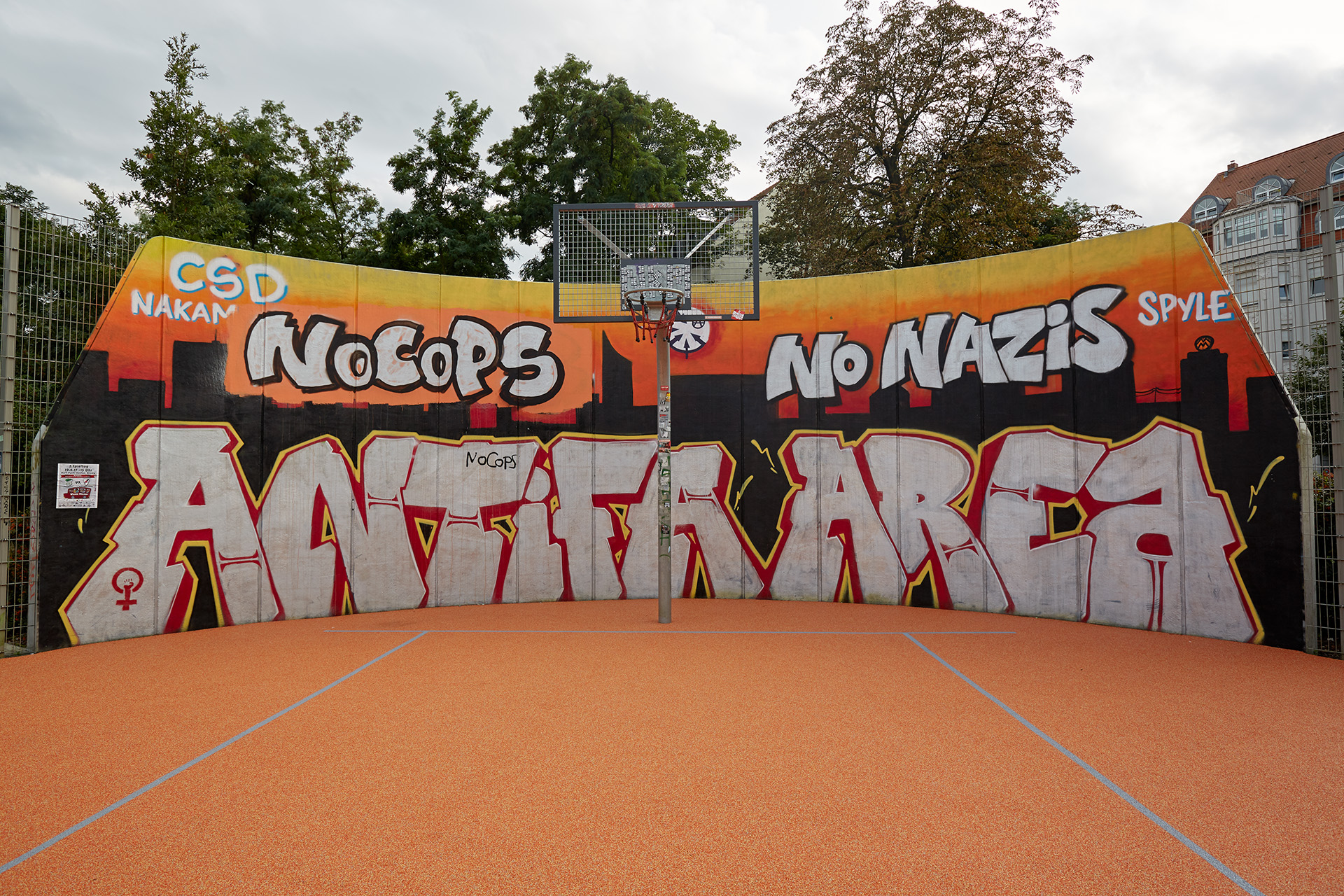
Streetball court at Connewitzer Cross (2017)

Today, Connewitzer Holz with its extensive network of paths offers good opportunities for private sporting activities such as jogging and cycling. Sports facilities are located on Teich Street and Neue Linie in Connewitzer Holz. The former is home to the Roter Stern Leipzig '99 e. V. sports club. Badminton, table tennis, roller derby, boxing, cycling, off-road, volleyball, handball, darts, tennis, croquet, frisbee, boules, bowling and soccer are played there. The RSL was awarded the 2010 Julius Hirsch Prize by the German Football Association (DFB) for its commitment to combating discrimination based on gender, ethnicity, or sexual preference. The facility at the Neue Linie belongs to the Leipzig Transportation Companies Sports Association. There are soccer fields and tennis courts. There is a large outdoor skate park on Conne Island and a streetball court at Connewitz Cross.

The LUAS sports hall is located on Arno-Nitzsche Street. Two large fitness studios offer their services in Connewitz.

A popular leisure activity in Connewitz is allotment. There are four allotment garden associations in the northeastern part of the district: Recreation, Gardening Friends South, Woodland Idyll, and Reichs Railroad Connewitz. The Connewitz municipal garden is located on Kohrener/Burgstädter Street. It is the former school garden of the former 54th Polytechnic Secondary School (POS), which was converted into a public exhibition, information and recreation garden in 1993.

== Notable people ==
- Elena Gerhardt (1883–1961), concert singer, born in Connewitz
- Heinrich Schomburgk (1885–1965), tennis player, born in Connewitz
- Elisabeth Hartenstein (1900–1994), writer, born in Connewitz
- Ingeborg Krabbe (1931–2017), actress, born in Connewitz and buried in the cemetery there
- Dagmar Elsner-Schwintowsky (1939–1997), graphic artist and illustrator, born in Connewitz

== See also ==
- List of streets and squares in Leipzig

== Bibliography ==
- Connewitz – Eine historische und städtebauliche Studie. PROLEIPZIG 2008
- Horst Riedel: Stadtlexikon Leipzig von A bis Z. PRO LEIPZIG, Leipzig 2005, ISBN 3-936508-03-8
- Thomas Liebscher: Im Leipziger Pleisseland. Connewitz, Lössnig, Dölitz. Passage publishing house Leipzig 1996, ISBN 3-9804313-4-7
- Oswald Müller, Thomas Nabert: Connewitz – Ein Leipziger Ortsteil auf alten Ansichtskarten, PRO LEIPZIG 2011, ISBN 978-3-936508-58-1
- Paul Altenburger: Die Entwicklung des Vorortes Connewitz. Trade Association Leipzig-South 1926.
- Morgenstern et al.: Connewitz. Connewitzer Verlagsbuchhandlung (Hrsg.) 1993, ISBN 3-928833-13-8
- Nünthel u. a.: UT Connewitz & Co. Kinogeschichte(n) aus Leipzig-Süd. Sax publishing house Beucha, 2004, ISBN 3-934544-67-3
- Thomas Steinert: Connewitzer Welttheater, Fotografien 1969–1994. Lehmstedt publishing house, 2006, ISBN 3-937146-34-2
- Connewitz as Konnewitz. In: August Schumann: Vollständiges Staats-, Post- und Zeitungslexikon von Sachsen. Volume 5. Schumann, Zwickau 1818, p. 76.
- Connewitz. In: August Schumann: Vollständiges Staats-, Post- und Zeitungslexikon von Sachsen. Volume 17. Schumann, Zwickau 1830, p. 519 f.
- Michael Liebmann: Connewitz. Vom Werden eines Leipziger Stadtteils. PROLEIPZIG, Leipzig 2015, ISBN 978-3-945027-16-5
- Franziska Werner, Rico Rokitte: Randlagen im subkulturellen Raum. Zur Lebenswirklichkeit älterer Menschen in Leipzig-Connewitz. In: Frank Eckardt, Rene Seyfarth, Franziska Werner [Ed.]: Leipzig. Die neue Ordnung der unsichtbaren Stadt. Unrast publishing house Münster, 2015, ISBN 978-3-89771-577-6
