= Conne Island =

Cultural center in Leipzig, Germany

Coordinates: 51°18′11″N 12°22′27″E

- Eiskeller
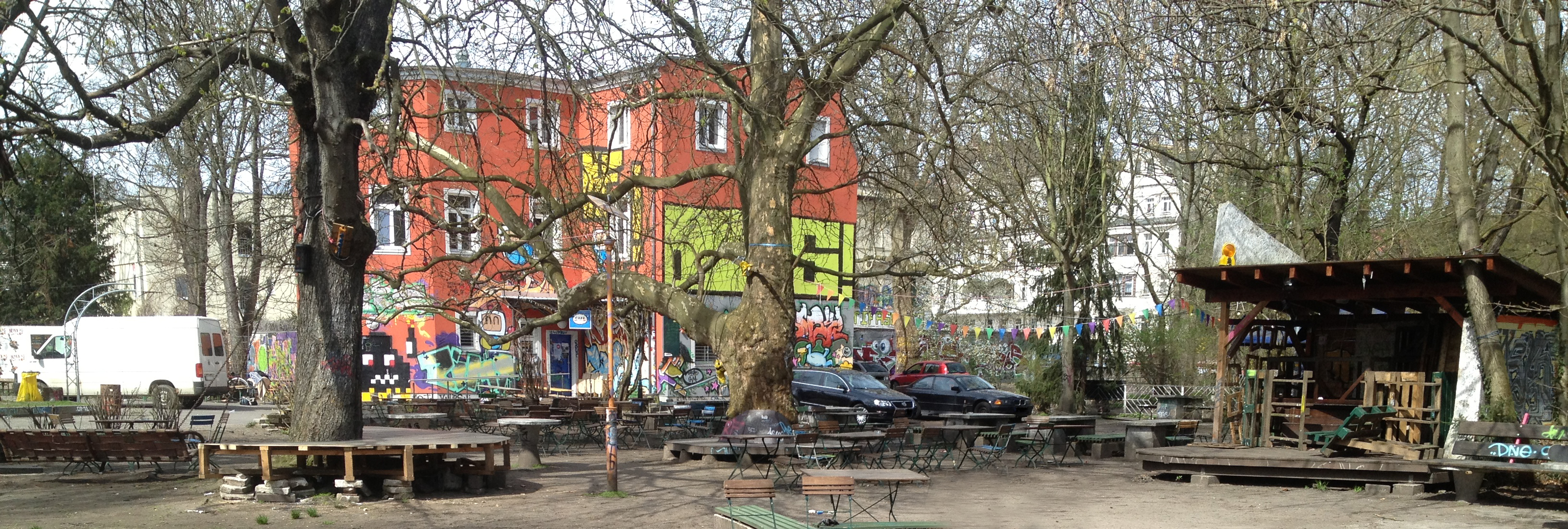
- The center in 2013
- Interactive map of Conne Island
- Former names: Eiskeller, Klubhaus Erich Zeigner
- Location: Leipzig, Germany
- Type: Music venue and self-managed social center

Construction
- Built: 19th century
- Opened: 1991

Website
- www.conne-island.de

Conne Island is a music venue and self-managed social center in the Connewitz district of Leipzig, Germany. Outside, there is a large skate park.

== History ==
The building was built in the second half of the 19th century. Initially, it was a restaurant called "Eiskeller" (ice pit). From 1937 onwards, it was used as a center for the Hitler Jugend, and after 1945 in the GDR it was called "Klubhaus Erich Zeigner" and used as a FDJ youth club. Although the name "Eiskeller" is no longer officially used, this name is still in use by the local population as a nickname.

Conne Island has become a stronghold and well-known meeting point for the radical left. The center hosts hardcore and punk gigs, and also hip hop, electronic music and heavy metal. A performance by the black metal band Mayhem, recorded in 1990 before the venue became Conne Island, was released in 1993 under the title Live in Leipzig.

In the 2010s, the center became known as an Anti-German project. Palestinian keffiyehs would be confiscated and returned at the end of the night with a note. The project celebrated 20 years of existence in 2011. In 2016, there were controversies when a self-confessed "Islam hater" spoke at the center and women spoke up about being sexually harassed at club nights.

During the COVID-19 pandemic, German-American record label Unity Worldwide Records compiled and released a benefit Various Artists compilation to help keep the venue open. Strength Thru Unity: A Conne Island Benefit Compilation was released on 18 October 2021 and features exclusive songs from As Friends Rust, Be Well, Beatsteaks, Boysetsfire, Cock Sparrer, Comeback Kid, Death by Stereo, Field Day, Heaven Shall Burn, Pascow, Perkele, Sick of It All, Terrorgruppe, Think About Mutation, Turbostaat, Youth of Today and Zoli Téglás.

Repeated calls for a boycott of the venue cite, among other accusations, the ban on wearing keffiyehs on the project's premises. According to Conne Island's own statements, this led to a series of cancellations from artists in 2023 and 2024.
