= Leipzig Wildlife Park =

Zoo in Leipzig, Germany

Coordinates: 51.29777°N 12.36611°E

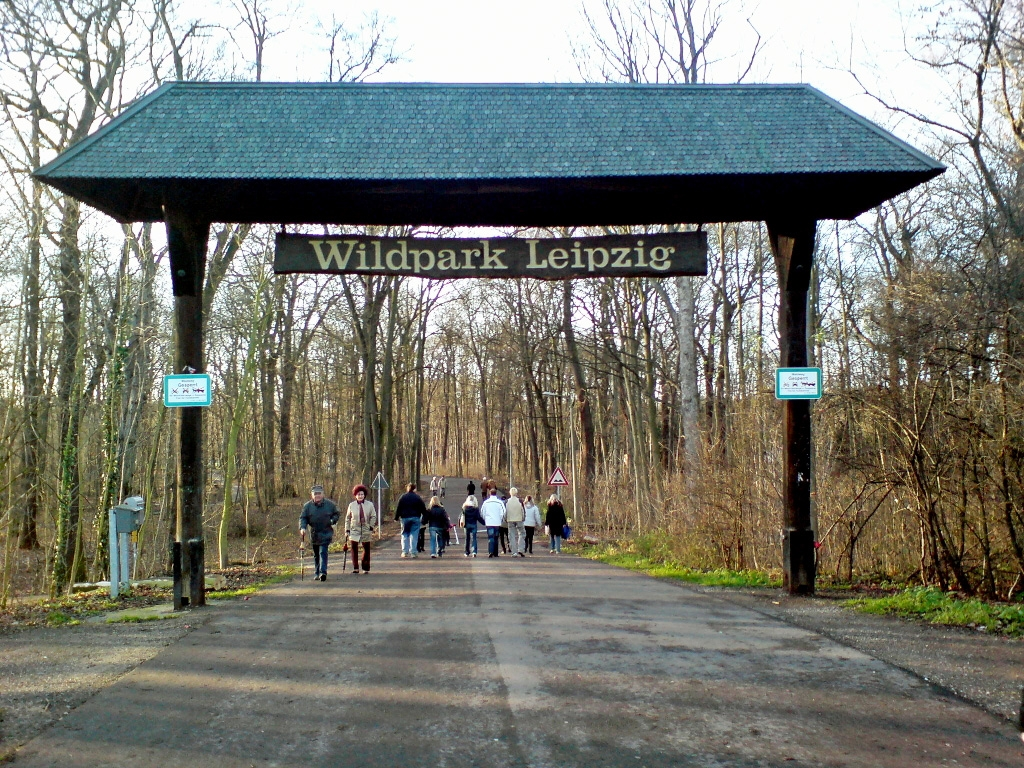
Entrance to the Leipzig Wildlife Park

The Leipzig Wildlife Park (in German: Wildpark Leipzig) is a zoo on the southern outskirts of Leipzig in the neighbourhood of Connewitz, Germany. It is located in the Leipzig Riverside Forest and is 42 ha (103.8 acres) in size.

In the Leipzig Wildlife Park, around 25 animal species with around 250 animals that live or have lived in Central Europe or that have become native here are shown with free admission. Red deer, fallow deer and mouflon have a common large enclosure. There are also extensive enclosures for deer, wild boar, elk and European bison. Lynxes, otters, wildcats, raccoons, minks, red foxes and the European mink are kept in open outdoor enclosures.

An exhibition room is available for the presentation of exhibitions and events. On a special adventure trail, visitors to the wildlife park have the opportunity to observe game without barriers. The tea house housed in a Russian log house, the wildlife park restaurant and a snack bar provide catering within the park. There are two playgrounds on the wildlife park grounds: the fairytale castle forest playground at the main entrance to Koburger Straße and the fairytale playground behind the Russian tea house.

On the grounds of the wildlife park are the Jungfernlache and Panichs Lache, two oxbow lakes of the Pleiße and Weißer Elster in their common floodplain.

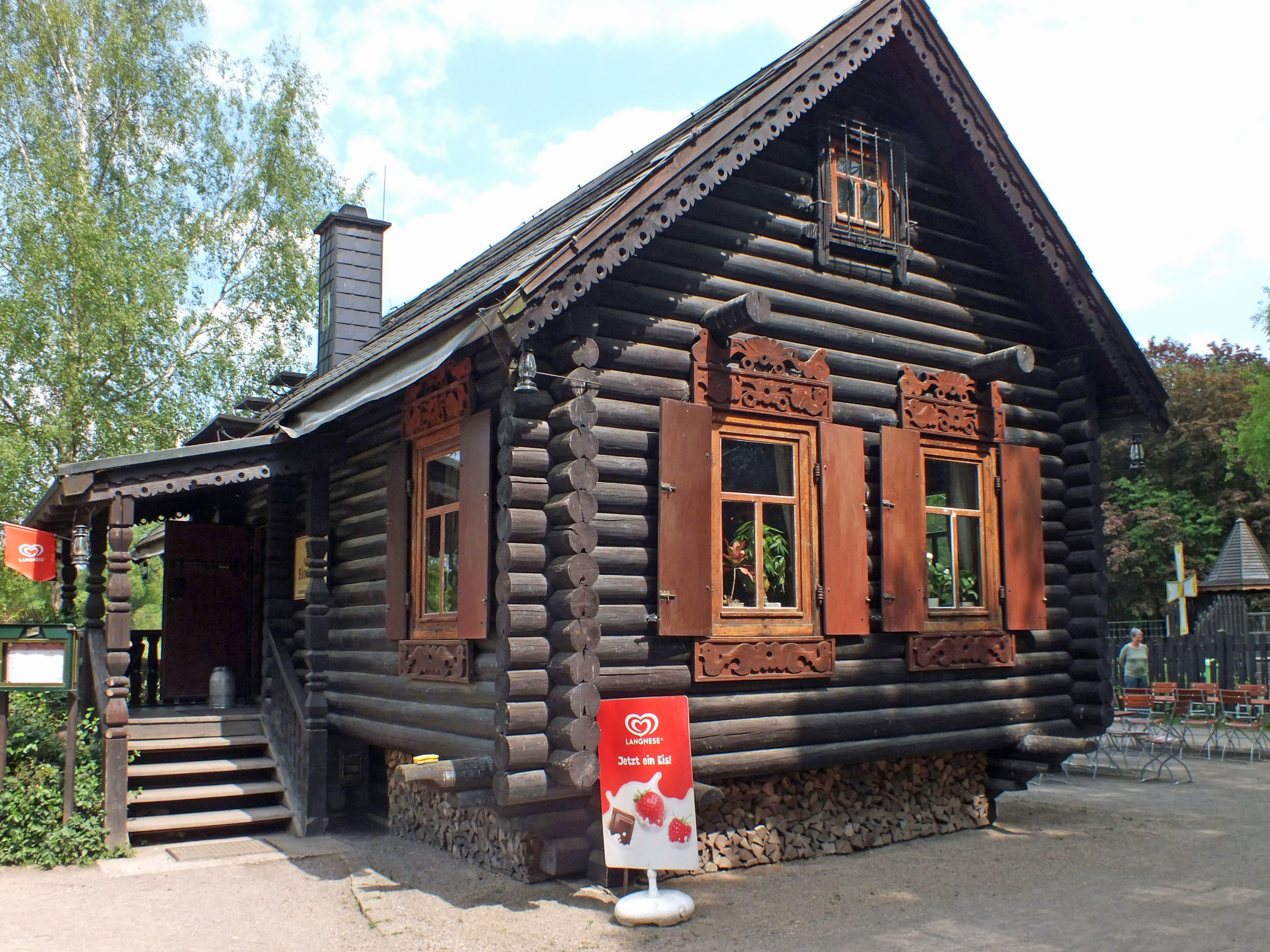
Russian log house Izba

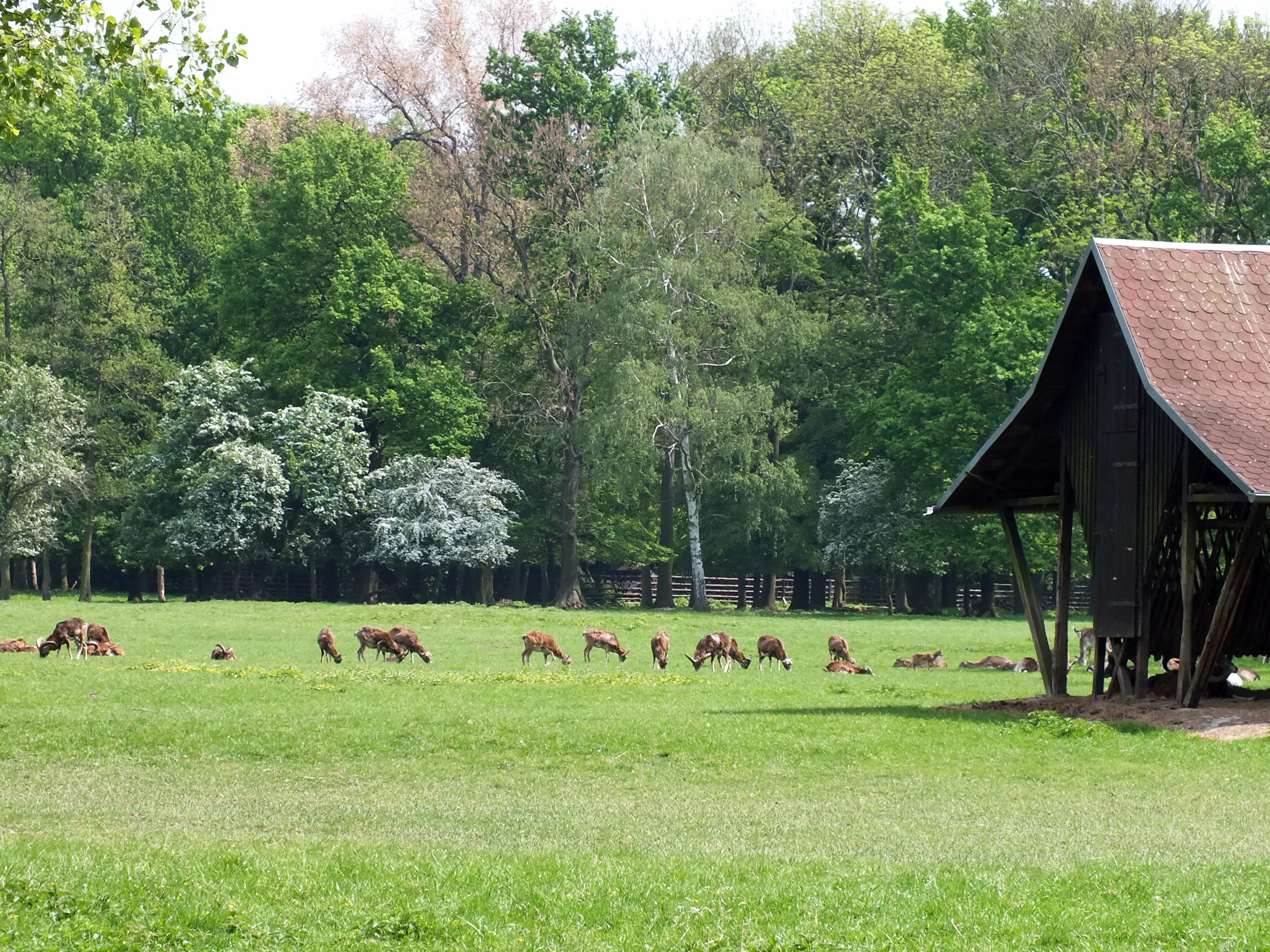
Large enclosure

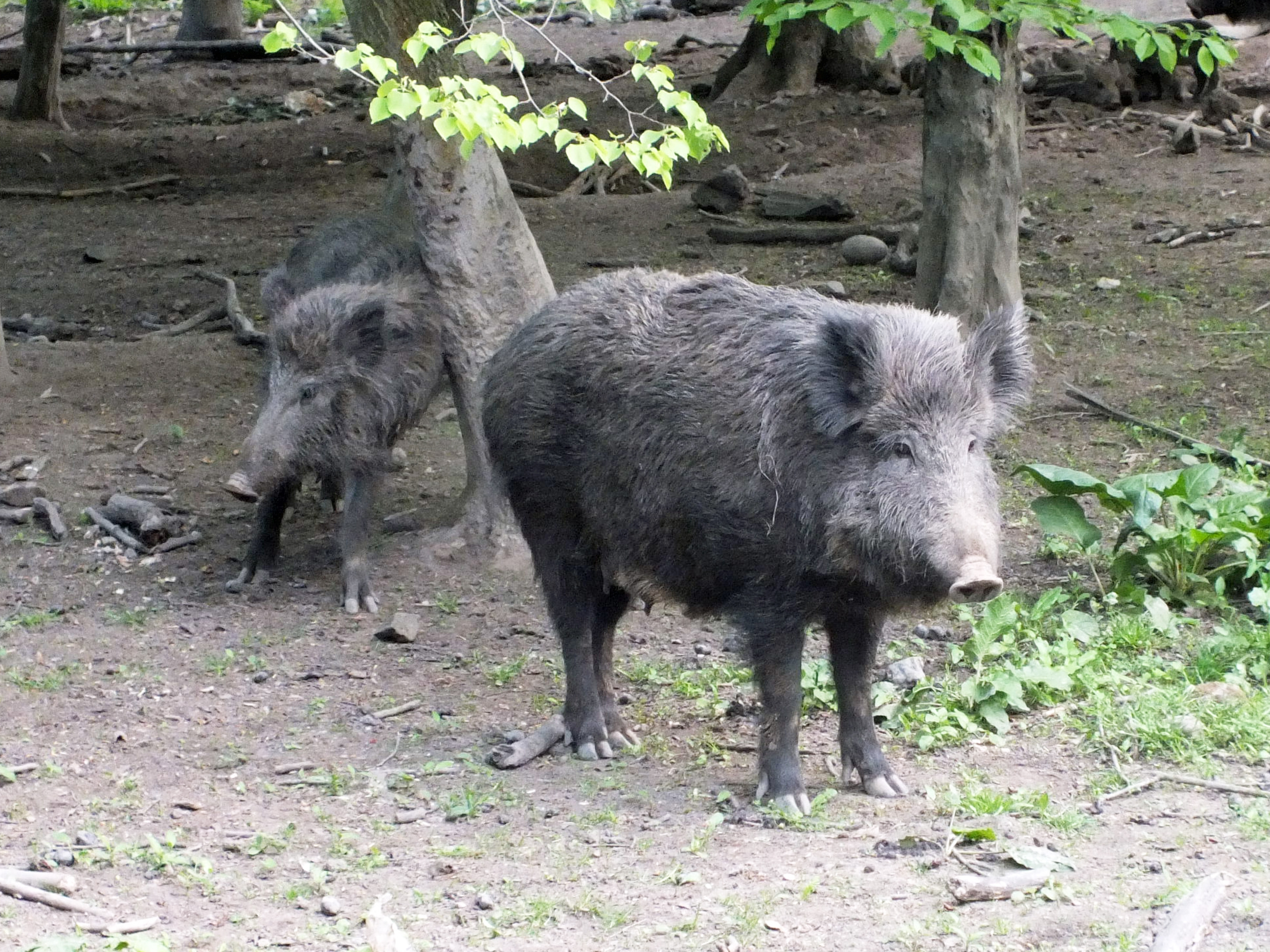
Wild boar

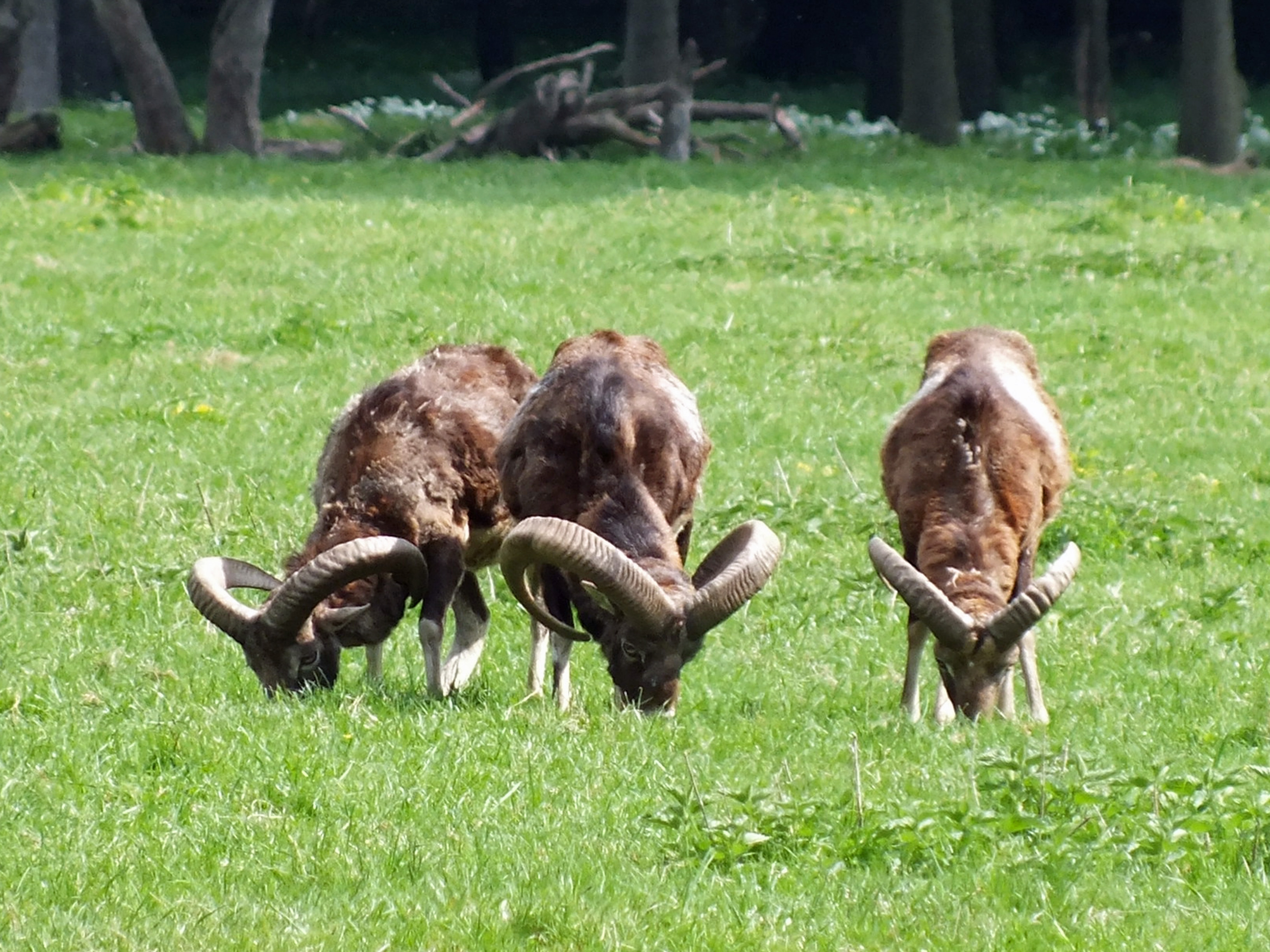
Mouflons

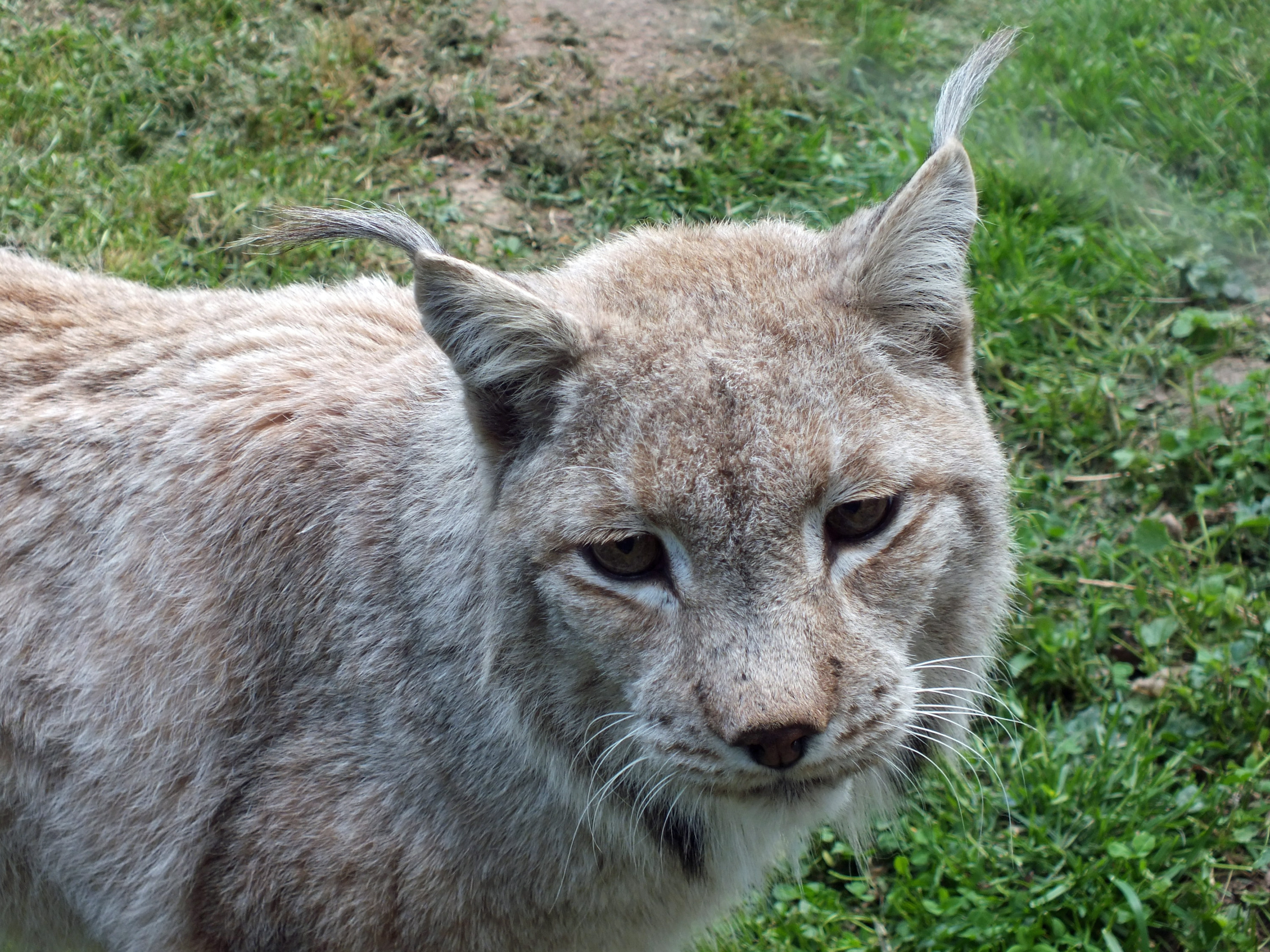
Lynx

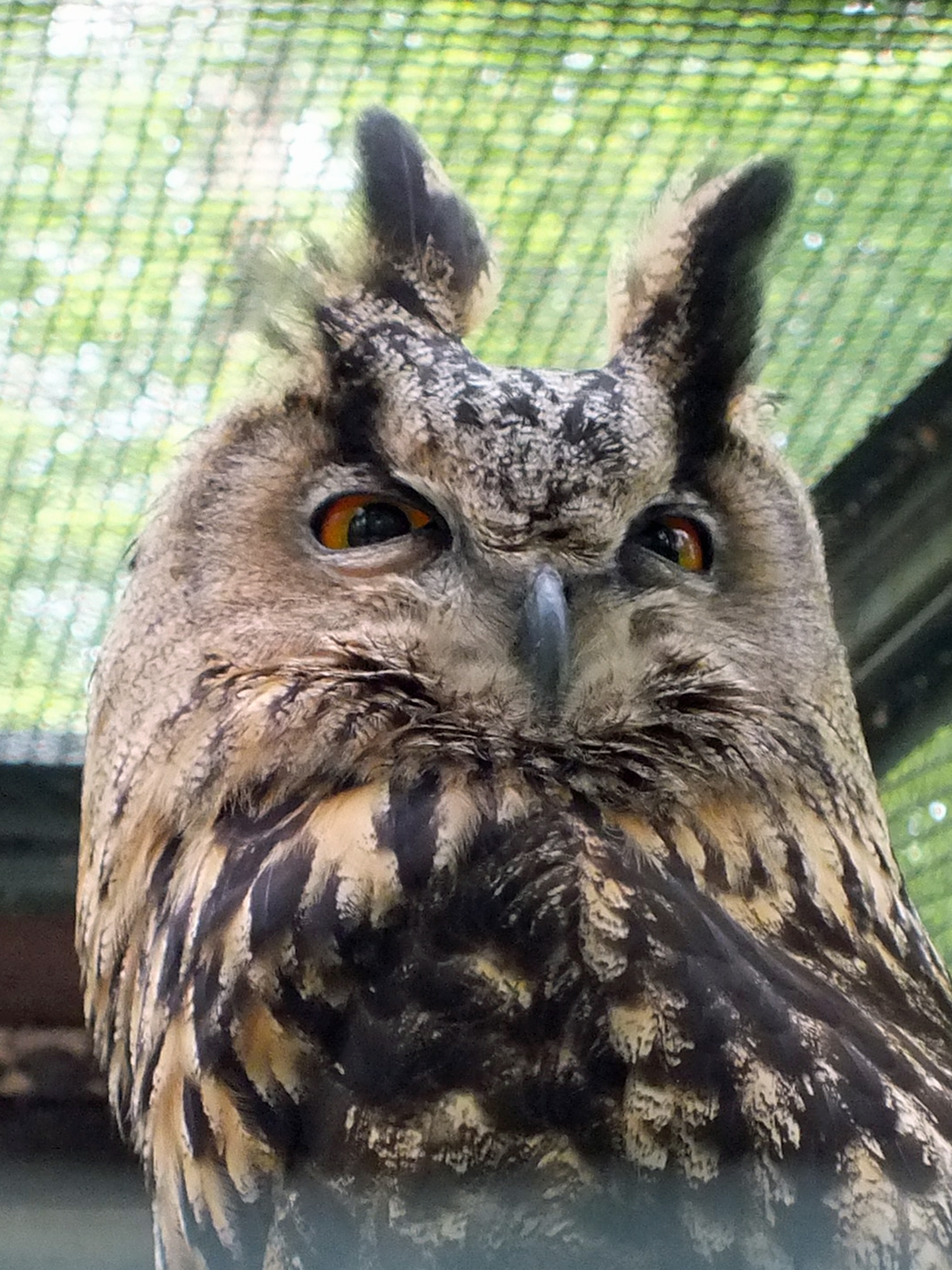
Uhu

== History ==
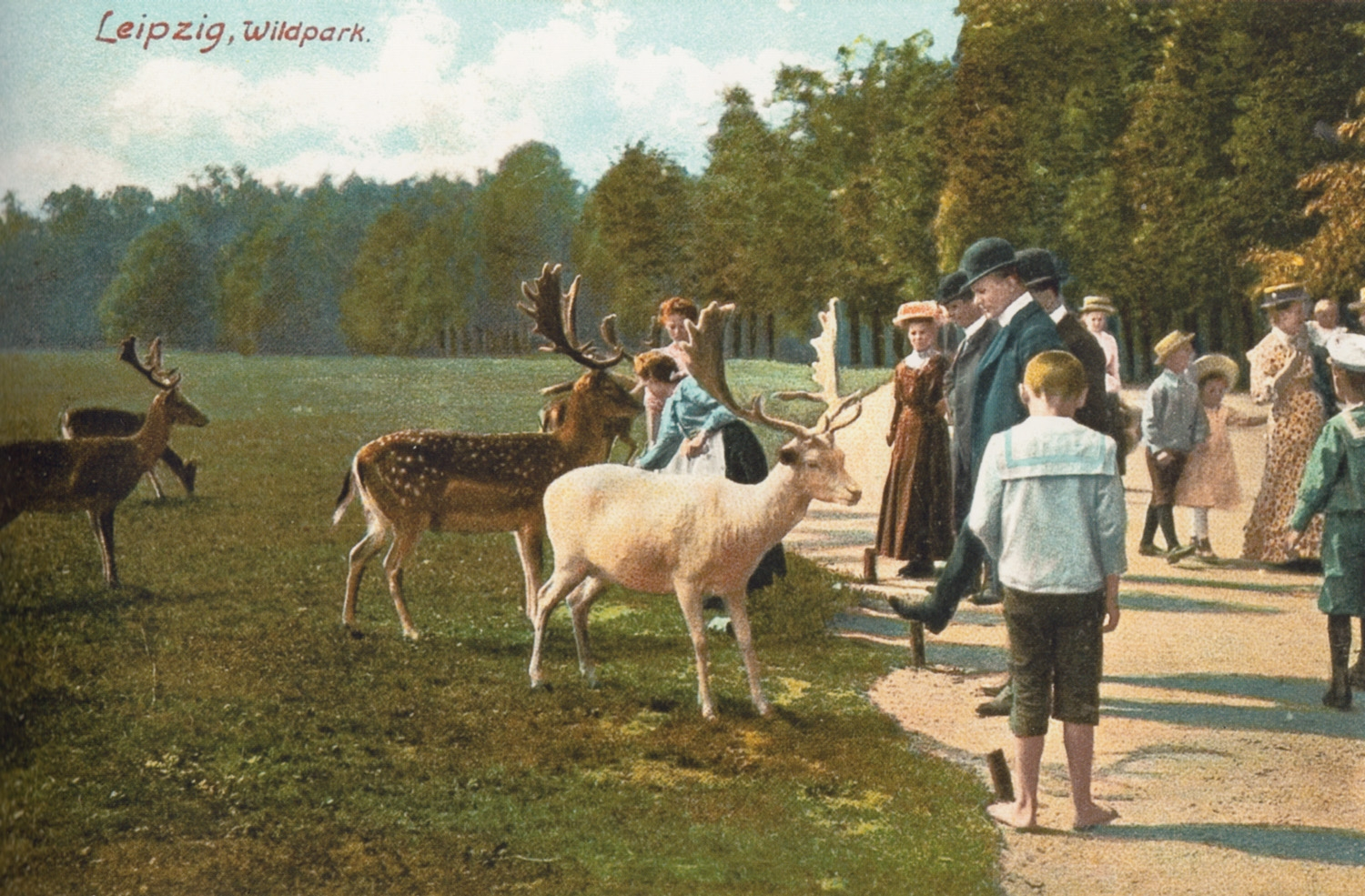
In the Leipzig Wildlife Park around 1910

In 1904, the city council received four fallow deer from the mill owner Richard Jacob from Connewitz, for which a preserve was set up in the Stempel territory location. Due to frequent flooding, the choice of location proved to be unsuitable. In 1906, an area around the Heidaer Wiesen was fenced off and the animal population, which had since grown, was moved. In 1912 a refuge was opened, which served milk, tea, mineral water and baked goods, before a wildlife park restaurant was built in 1922 in the zone of today's farm.

In the 1930s, the Leipzig City Council made a neighboring area available to the Reichszentrale für Pelztier und Rauchwarenforschung (Reich Center for Fur Animal and Fur Clothing Research) for a silver fox experimental farm. It was hoped that this would create an additional attraction for the so-called deer park. However, the proximity to a local recreation area turned out to be a disadvantage, as the many excursionists constantly worried the animals. The university's veterinary faculty later created its own research institute in the neighbourhood of Dölitz.

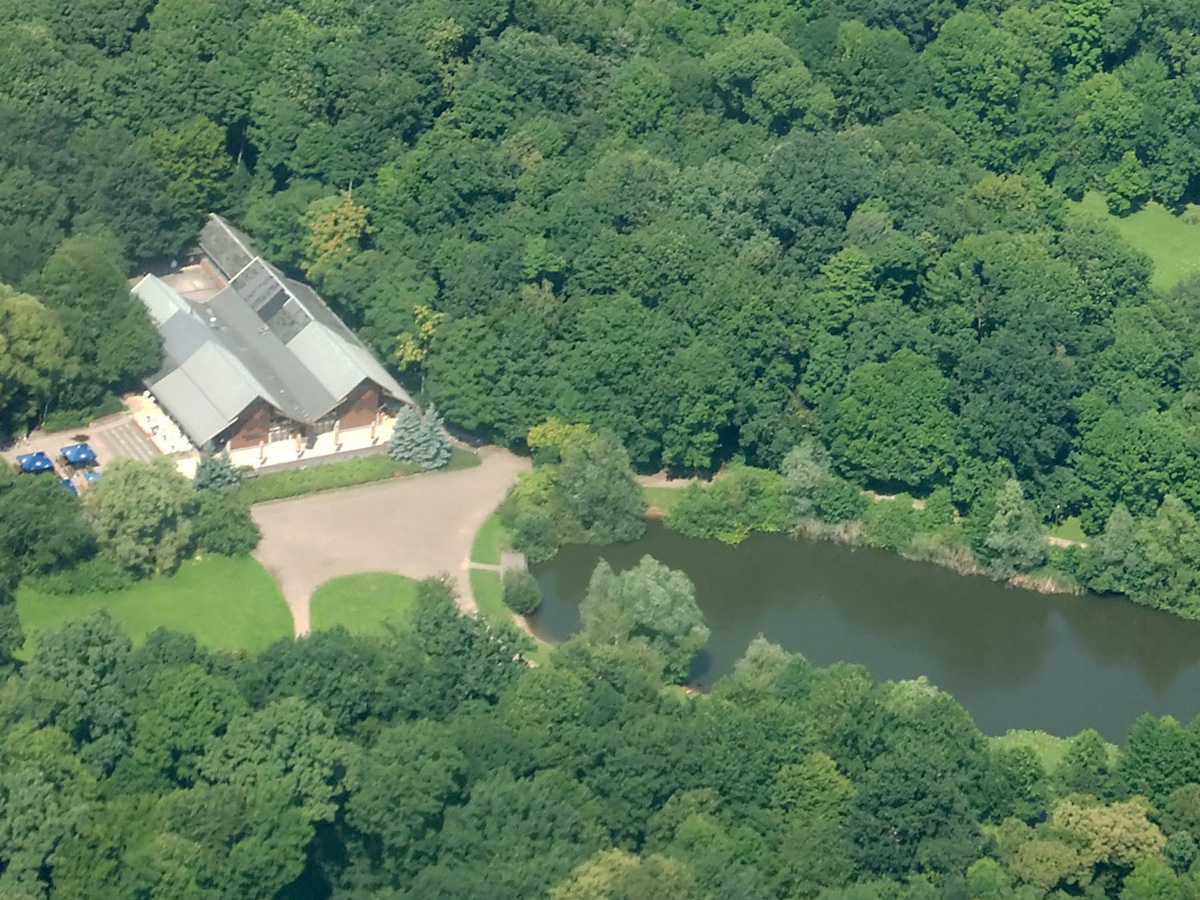
The wildlife park restaurant at Hakenteich, 2008

The Second World War ended the development of the wildlife park and brought its complete destruction, including the restaurant. At the end of the war, the enclosures were opened to protect the animals from attacks.

It was not until 1972 that the Leipzig city council decided to create a new wildlife park in the area of the former animal enclosures. Construction began on 1 January 1974 and the entire facility with its current dimensions was handed over in October 1979. Also in 1974, construction began on a new wildlife park restaurant, now at Hakenteich. (Architects: Winfried Sziegoleit, Volker Sieg)
