= Roter Stern Leipzig =

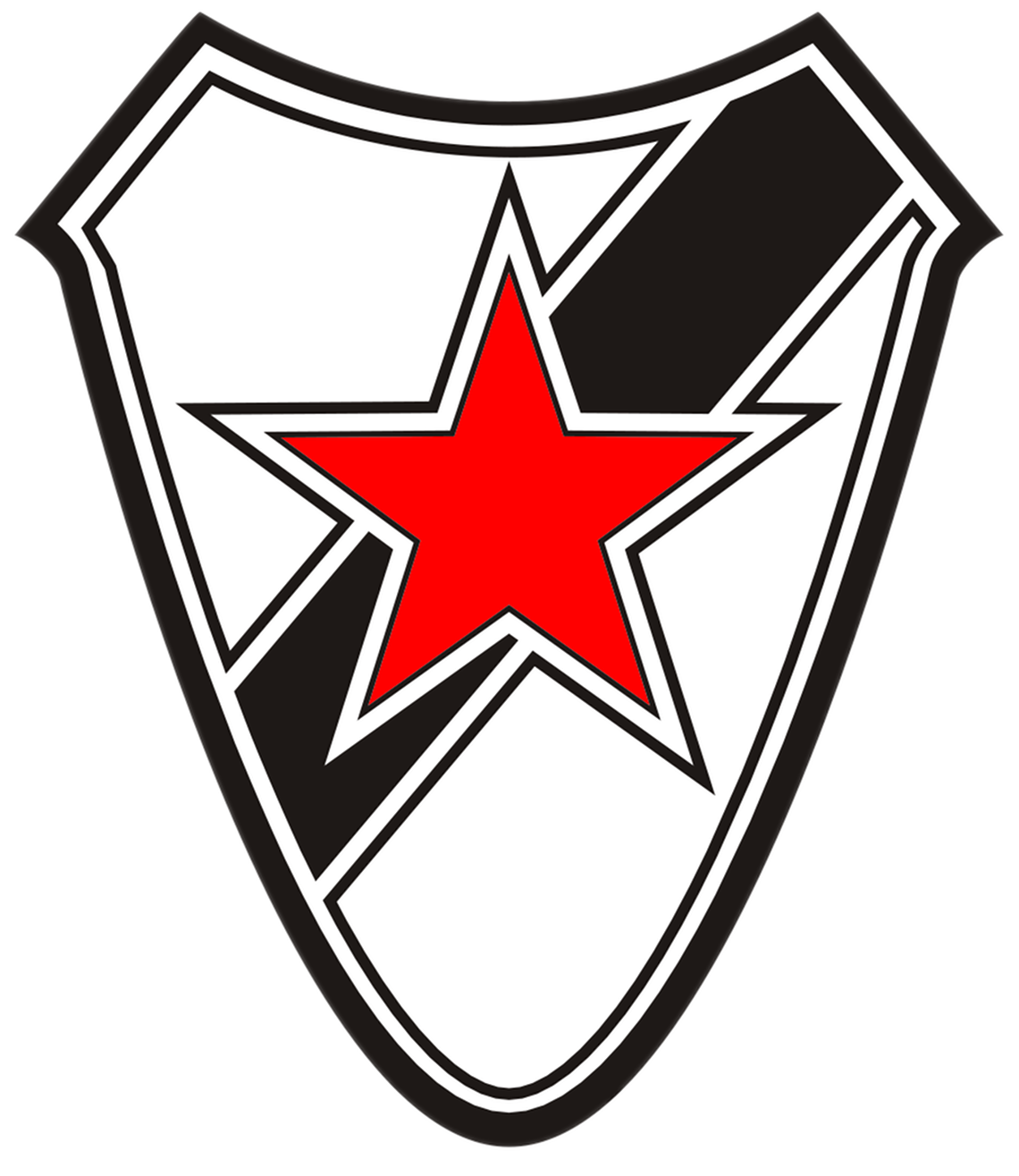
- Full name: Roter Stern Leipzig ’99 e. V.
- Short name: RSL
- Founded: 1 February 1999
- Ground: Sportpark Dölitz
- Capacity: 1200
- League: Landesklasse Nord
- 2024-25: 10th
- Website: rotersternleipzig.de
Home colours	Away colours

Roter Stern Leipzig ’99 e.V., known commonly as Roter Stern Leipzig is a German multi-sports club from Leipzig founded in 1999. The club includes most notably a football section.

== Football history ==
Roter Stern Leipzig ’99 e.V. was founded on 1 February 1999 as a association football club by 20 alternative young people. On 5 September 1999, the first and second men’s teams played their first competitive match in the 3. Kreisklasse, the lowest league in the German football league system (11th tier). In the following years, the first team achieved several promotions and reached the city cup final in 2002. In the 2008/09 season, they reached the Leipzig Bezirksklasse (8th tier).

On 24 October 2009, an away match in Brandis was interrupted due to riots by several dozen individuals with a right-wing extremist background. Investigations on suspicion of serious Breach of the peace and dangerous bodily harm were opened against unknown suspects. Within the following year, five perpetrators were sentenced to prison terms between two and three years, and nineteen additional proceedings were initiated.

On 22 May 2011, Roter Stern Leipzig secured promotion to the Bezirksliga Leipzig Nord (7th tier) five matches before the end of the season with a goalless draw against SG Rotation Leipzig in front of 780 spectators. In the 2011/12 season, the team finished 13th (last) and were relegated to the newly created Stadtliga, which replaced the previous Bezirksklasse divisions.

For the second half of the 2013/14 season, the British sportswear manufacturer Lonsdale became the kit sponsor of the first and second men’s teams. The company also provided a bus fitted with a loudspeaker system, which was used off the pitch for events including anti-fascist demonstrations.

The 2014/15 season included the construction of a €700,000 "social wing" in an old, vacant, listed gymnasium, providing changing rooms and showers. On the pitch, the first team remained unbeaten for 13 consecutive matches while competing with VfK Blau-Weiß Leipzig. On the final matchday, Roter Stern trailed the table leaders by one point, and both clubs faced ostensibly easier opponents. Ten minutes before the end, Roter Stern led their game 8-1, while Blau-Weiß trailed 1-2. Severe weather caused the Blau-Weiß match to be abandoned, while nearby fixtures were completed. Ten days later, the sports court awarded Blau-Weiß's match as a 0-2 forfeit, making Roter Stern Leipzig city champions and promoting them to the Landesklasse Nord.

== Club culture and supporters ==
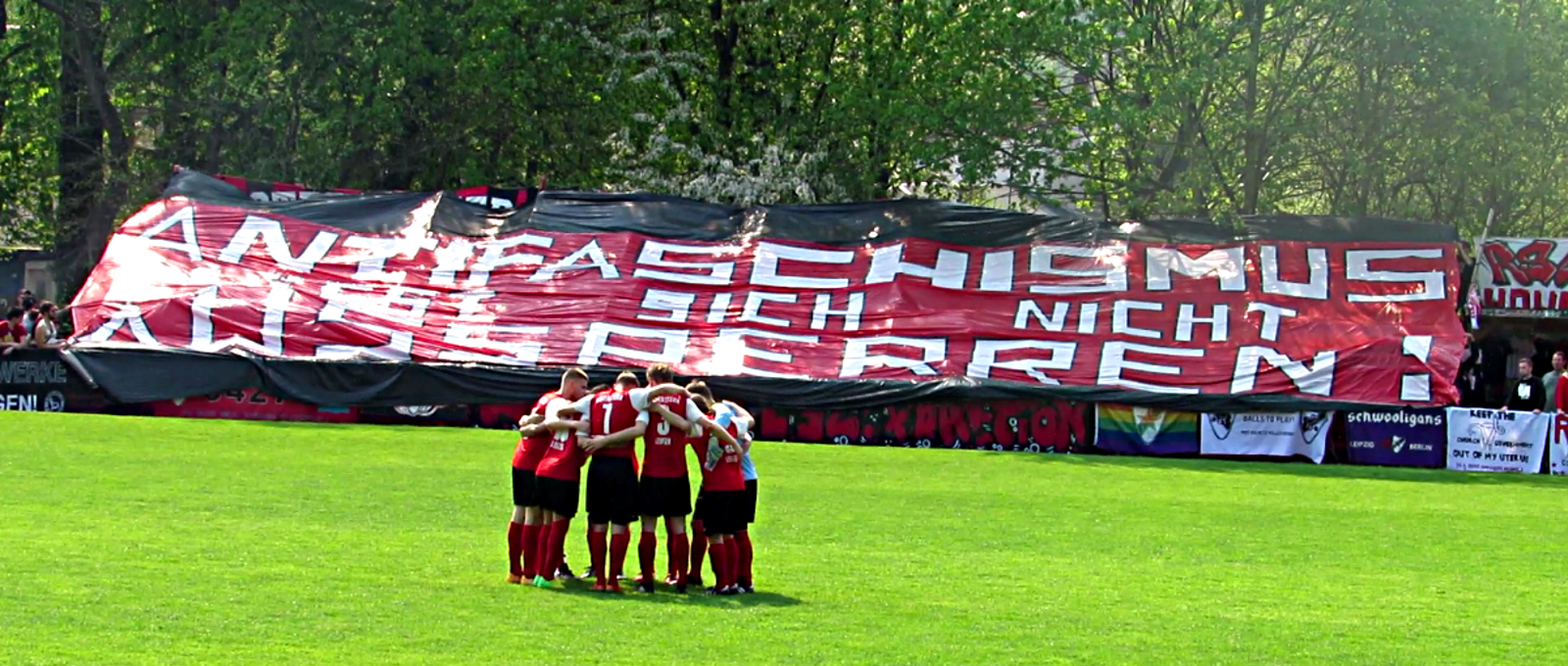
Choreography with an anti-fascist message made by the club's ultras Rote Allez! Fraktion

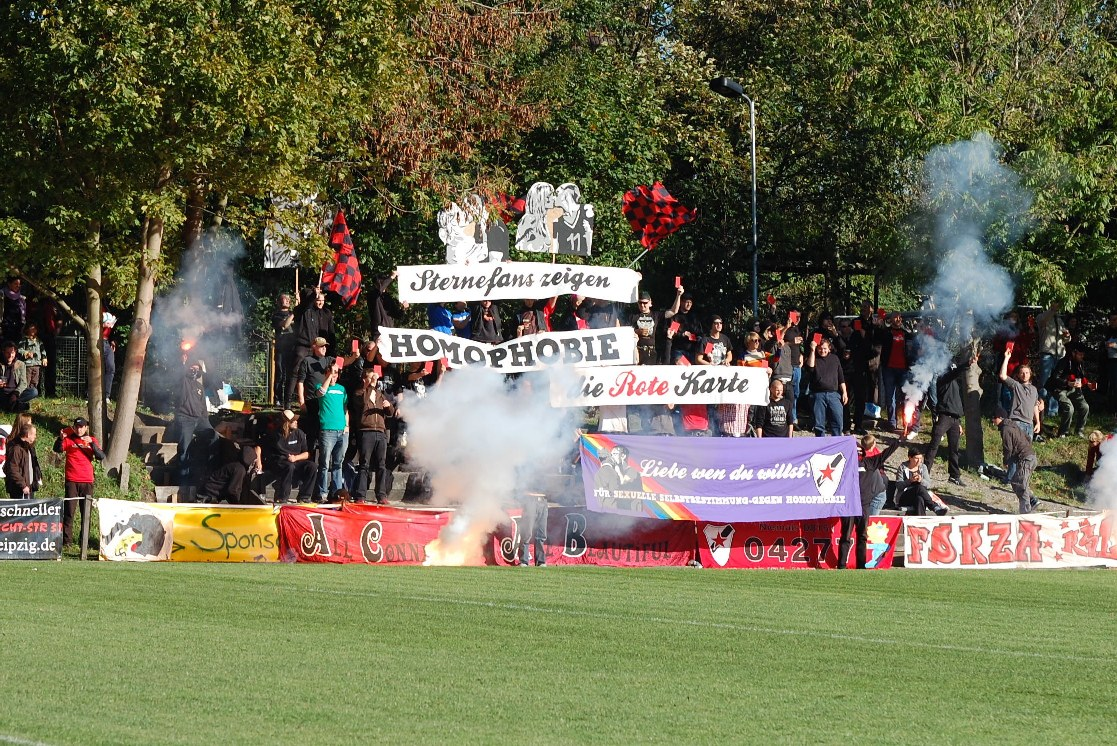
Roter Stern Leipzig supporters holding up a banner rallying against homophobia

Roter Stern Leipzig was founded in 1999 in the Connewitz district of Leipzig by a group of alternative youth from the punk, Oi!, and Antifa scenes. From the outset, the club incorporated an anti-fascist, anti-sexist, and anti-homophobic ethos, which has informed supporter culture. The earliest supporters were largely drawn from Leipzig’s left-wing subculture and participated in demonstrations, concerts, and other community activities connected to the club. By 2002, the club’s first team reached the city cup final, attracting a record 1,300 spectators.

In 2009, during an away game against FSV Brandis, supporters were affected by an attack from approximately 50 far-right individuals, resulting in serious injuries. Following this, police accompaniment became standard at away matches due to security concerns. In 2010 and subsequent years, supporters continued to encounter hostility at away fixtures in surrounding areas, where fans were targeted with racist and neo-Nazi chants. The club and its supporters responded by ensuring that games in these areas were treated as security matches with police presence.

Supporters participate actively at home games in Sportpark Dölitz, which regularly draw several hundred spectators. Matchday displays include banners, flags, drums, and pyrotechnics, which are part of the fan culture despite restrictions on their use. The club maintains organised supporter groups, such as Kategorie A and later Orda Rossa, which coordinate chants, visual displays, merchandise sales, and travel to away games. Supporters are involved in discussions and decision-making processes regarding the club's direction, reflecting the club's member-driven governance model.

Supporter activities have consistently combined sporting support with political engagement. For example, in December 2018, fans of both Roter Stern Leipzig and RB Leipzig II used multicolored smoke bombs as part of a demonstration against homophobia and sexism. On 24 October 2021, Roter Stern Leipzig’s second men’s team left the pitch at a Leipzig City Cup match after it was announced that one of the oppposing players was a convicted participant in the 2016 neo-Nazi attack on Connewitz. The team had previously requested that the opposing club not field the player, but the request was denied. Roter Stern Leipzig treated the early departure as a protest to uphold their anti-fascist principles, foregoing the match and accepting the resulting forfeit.
