= 2010 in India =

- Centuries: 19th; 20th; 21st
- Decades: 1990s; 2000s; 2010s; 2020s
- See also: List of years in India; Timeline of Indian history

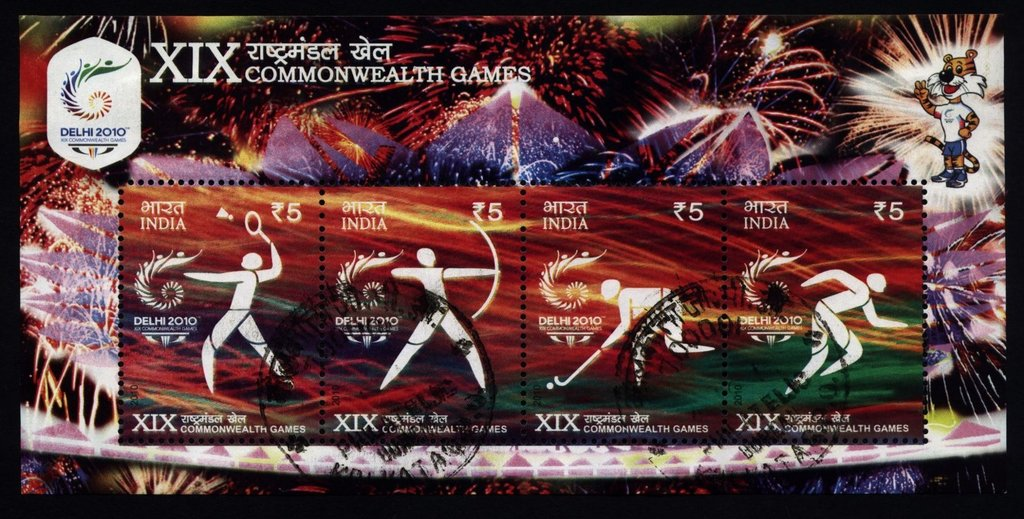
Stamp of India in 2010 of Commonwealth Games

Events in the year 2010 in the Republic of India.

== Incumbents ==
Photo	Post	Name
	(India) President	Pratibha Patil
	(India) Vice President	Mohammad Hamid Ansari
	(India) Prime Minister	Dr. Manmohan Singh
	(India) Chief Justice	K. G. Balakrishnan (till 12 May)
	(India) Chief Justice	S. H. Kapadia (starting 12 May)

=== Governors ===
Post	Name
Andhra Pradesh	E. S. L. Narasimhan
Arunachal Pradesh	Joginder Jaswant Singh
Assam	Janaki Ballabh Patnaik
Bihar	Devanand Konwar
Chhattisgarh	E. S. L. Narasimhan (until 23 January); Shekhar Dutt (starting 23 January)
Goa	Shivinder Singh Sidhu
Gujarat	Kamala Beniwal
Haryana	Jagannath Pahadia
Himachal Pradesh	Prabha Rau (until 23 January); Urmila Singh (starting 23 January)
Jammu and Kashmir	Narinder Nath Vohra
Jharkhand	Kateekal Sankaranarayanan (until 21 January); M. O. H. Farook (starting 22 January)
Karnataka	Hansraj Bhardwaj
Kerala	R. S. Gavai (until 7 September); M. O. H. Farook (starting 7 September)
Madhya Pradesh	Rameshwar Thakur (until 7 September); Ram Naresh Yadav (starting 7 September)
Maharashtra	S.C. Jamir (until 22 January); Kateekal Sankaranarayanan (starting 22 January)
Manipur	Gurbachan Jagat
Meghalaya	Ranjit Shekhar Mooshahary
Mizoram	M. M. Lakhera (until 2 September); Vakkom Purushothaman (starting 2 September)
Nagaland	Nikhil Kumar
Odisha	Murlidhar Chandrakant Bhandare
Punjab	Sunith Francis Rodrigues (until 22 January); Shivraj Vishwanath Patil (starting 22 January)
Rajasthan	Prabha Rau (until 26 April); Shivraj Patil (starting 26 April)
Sikkim	Balmiki Prasad Singh
Tamil Nadu	Surjit Singh Barnala
Tripura	Dnyandeo Yashwantrao Patil
Uttar Pradesh	Banwari Lal Joshi
Uttarakhand	Margaret Alva
West Bengal	Devanand Konwar (until 23 January); M.K. Narayanan (starting 23 January)

== Events ==
- National income - ₹76,344,721 million

=== January ===
- 2 January – First three Uttar Pradesh rail accidents: Three train accidents occur in Uttar Pradesh amid thick fog. Ten people died in the accidents and 45 others were injured.
- 9 January – 2009 attacks on Indian students in Australia: An Indian man is set on fire in Melbourne, Australia, in the latest in a series of attacks on Indian nationals in the country.
- 16 January – Fourth Uttar Pradesh rail accident: two express trains collide in thick fog in India's northern state of Uttar Pradesh. Three people died in the accident and around a dozen were injured.
- 17 January – Fifth Uttar Pradesh rail accidents: A car hit by a train at an unmanned crossing in Barabanki district of Uttar Pradesh. Two of the six people in the car died and four got injured.
- 22 January – Sixth Uttar Pradesh rail accidents: A goods train derailed near Azamgarh in Uttar Pradesh on Friday, disrupting rail traffic in the region. No one was injured in the accident.
- 25 January – Environment ministers from the G4 bloc (IBSA Dialogue Forum & China) meet in New Delhi, India, to agree a common position ahead of future climate change talks.
- 30 January – 12 people drown and at least 20 other went missing after a boat accident in West Godavari District, Andhra Pradesh in India.

=== February ===
- 5 February – The last native of India's Andaman Islands fluent in the Aka-Bo language dies, rendering the language extinct.
- 8 February – At least 17 Indian soldiers are killed in an avalanche in Kashmir.
- 13 February – 2010 Pune bombing: a bomb exploded at the German Bakery in the city of Pune in western India, killing 17 people and injuring at least 60 others. Two little known groups calling themselves the Lashkar-e-Taiba Al Alami and the Mujahideen Islami Muslim Front claimed they were behind the bomb attack. However, according to government agencies, the attack could have been part of a project by Lashkar-e-Taiba to use the Indian Mujahideen, called the 'Karachi project'. David Coleman Headley a Pakistani-American terror suspect has been accused of involvement in the project.
- 15 February – Silda camp attack: A Naxalite attack on an army camp in West Bengal kills 24 Indian soldiers, with many more reported missing.
- 17 February – 2010 Jalaun district bus crash: At least 22 people are killed in a bus crash in Northern India.

=== March ===
- 3 March – Three are killed in Indian Navy air show crash in Hyderabad, India.
- 4 March – 2010 Pratapgarh stampede: At least 63 people die after a stampede at a Hindu temple in Pratapgarh, Uttar Pradesh.
- 12 March – Russia signs a nuclear reactor deal with India which will see it build 16 nuclear reactors in India.
- 23 March – A fire tears through at a combined residential and office building in Kolkata, India, killing 24 people, including two who leapt to their deaths.
- 27 March – India test fires two short range missiles, the Dhanush and Prithvi II.
- 30 March – Somali pirates hijack 8 Indian vessels abducting 120 sailors, biggest abduction count till date, off the coast of Kismayo.

=== April ===
- 1 April – The Indian government initiates The Right of Children to Free and Compulsory Education Act to provide free and compulsory education to all children aged between 6 and 14 years, making education a fundamental right for millions of children.
- 1 April – India launches its new 2011 biometric census, the largest census in the world.
- 3 April – At least 10 Indian security personnel are killed and three injured when Maoist guerrillas blow up a police bus in Odisha's Koraput district.
- 6 April – 2010 Dantewada ambush: At least 70 Indian soldiers are killed in an attack by Naxalites in the Dantewada district of Chhattisgarh.
- 13 April – 2010 Eastern Indian storm: At least 140 people were killed in eastern India after a powerful storm demolished thousands of homes in West Bengal. Nearly 500,000 people were left homeless or otherwise affected by the storm.
- 15 April – The maiden flight of the Geosynchronous Satellite Launch Vehicle Mk.II, India's first launch with an indigenous cryogenic upper stage, ends in failure, resulting in the loss of the GSAT-4 satellite.
- 17 April – Twin bombs injure eight people outside M. Chinnaswamy Stadium in Bangalore ahead of an IPL-3 league game between the Royal Challengers Bangalore and the Mumbai Indians. A third device is located outside.
- 21 April - 2010 Mirchpur caste violence: Jat villagers in Mirchpur riot against the Balmiki Dalit population, killing two and injuring 51.
- 27 April – India arrests a woman working at its embassy in the Pakistani capital of Islamabad on charges of espionage.
- 29 April – 2010 Machil encounter: Three Kashmiri civilians are falsely killed by security personnel claimed to be Pakistani terrorists.

=== May ===
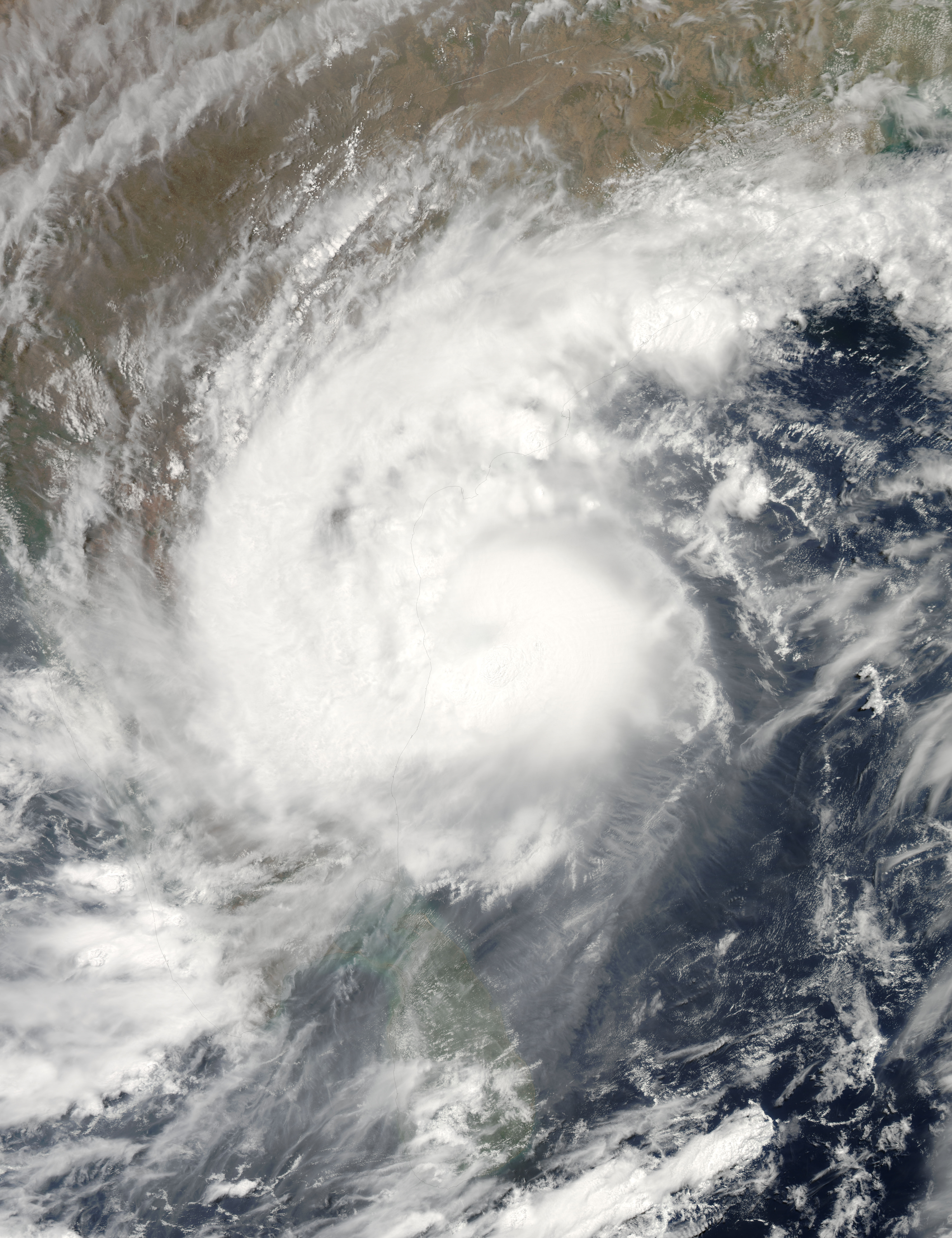
Cyclone Laila over India, 19 May 2010

- 3 May – Ajmal Kasab, the only surviving terrorist involved in the 2008 Mumbai attacks, is found guilty of murder, conspiracy, and waging war against India.
- 6 May – Ajmal Kasab, the only surviving member of a group responsible for the 2008 Mumbai attacks, is sentenced to death.
- 7 May – May 2010 Kashmir skirmishes: 5 insurgents and 2 soldiers die in a gunbattle between islamic terrorists and Indian security forces in Kashmir.
- 7–9 May – India International Light Fair & India International Sign Show in Mumbai.
- 8 May – Naxalite rebels blow up a bullet-proof vehicle of the Central Reserve Police Force in the Bijapur district of Chhattisgarh, killing seven officers.
- 10 May – Acharya Shri Mahashraman was declared the 11th Acharya of Jain Shwetambar Terapanth Sect
- 16 May – Maoist guerrillas kill six villagers in an alleged revenge attack in Chhattisgarh.
- 17 May – 2010 Dantewada bus bombing: Naxalite insurgents blow up a bus in India filled with police and paramilitaries. Fatalities reports range from 31 to 44, including several Special Police Officers (SPOs) and civilians.
- 19 May – 2010 North Indian Ocean cyclone season: Cyclone Laila approaches landfall in southeastern India, having already caused at least ten deaths and prompting the evacuations of 10,000 people in Tamil Nadu.
- 21 May – A court restores the Indian Hockey Federation, two years after it was dissolved by the country's Olympic chiefs over bribery allegations and poor on-field results.
- 21 May – Six girls aged between eight and twelve years drown in the Rapti in Balrampur while bathing.
- 22 May – Air India Express Flight 812 overshoots the runway at Mangalore International Airport in India, killing 158 and leaving 8 survivors.
- 23 May – Clashes break out between Indian and Pakistani troops near the border in the disputed Kashmir region.
- 28 May – Gyaneshwari Express train derailment: At least 25 people are killed and 150 injured in India after a Mumbai train with 13 passenger coaches is derailed by an explosion on the tracks and collides with another train as it traveled through the Paschim Medinipur district, a communist terrorist stronghold in eastern India.

=== June ===
- 2 June – 2010 Indian heatwave: A heat wave strikes India and South Asia, reaching 53°C (127°F) and killing many hundreds of people.
- 7 June – The Magistrate court in Bhopal, India convicts eight people, one posthumously, for their role in the Bhopal disaster industrial catastrophe 25 years ago in 1984.
- June–September: 2010 Kashmir unrest: Violent protests erupt in Kashmir over the killing of three Kashmiri civilians by security forces claimed to be Pakistani terrorists.
- 17 June – Heavy rains claim 46 lives in Maharashtra.
- 23 June – 1 person is killed when a crane crashes at Chennai International Airport, Chennai.
- 25 June – 17 people are killed and 25 others injured when an overcrowded bus collided head-on with a speeding truck near Chenaki More, about 30 km from Patna, India.
- 26 June – Four people are killed and five wounded in violence in Indian-administered Kashmir's Sopore area.
- 29 June – 2010 Maoist attack in Narayanpur: At least 26 policemen are killed in a Maoist attack in the central Indian state of Chhattisgarh.

=== July ===
- 4 July - Assault on Prof. T. J. Joseph a college teacher in Kerala by Popular Front of India members alleging Blasphemy.
- 5 July – A nationwide strike takes place in India in protest at a recent rise in fuel prices.
- 8 July – A bomb rips through the engine and coach of a passenger train in Assam, killing one person.
- 13 July – One death and three injuries result from a stampede during pulling of Ratha Yatra chariots in Puri, India.
- 13 July – The Supreme Court of India tentatively approves the Tamil Nadu government's new quota law, providing 69% of employment in educational institutions to scheduled castes and tribes and other backward classes.
- 14 July – Senior Indian Army officer Major AK Thinge is killed in battle in Kashmir.
- 15 July – The Indian rupee sign officially revealed by the Finance Ministry of India, and the Indian government said that it would try to adopt the sign by the end of 2010.
- 19 July – Two trains collide in the Birbhum district of West Bengal with at least 50 people feared dead.
- 20 July – Former Indian junior diplomat Madhuri Gupta is charged under the Official Secrets Act with spying for Pakistan.
- 21 July – Unidentified gunmen on motorcycles fatally shoot Indian civil rights campaigner and environmentalist Amit Jethwa in Ahmedabad, Gujarat.
- 23 July – The Indian Government unveils a solar power touch-screen laptop, cheaper than America's iPad, expected to be on sale next year.

=== August ===
- 1 August – Six people die in the Indian province of Jammu and Kashmir after a third day of clashes between security forces and Kashmiri separatists.
- 4 August – About 70 Indian police personnel are reported missing in Chhattisgarh forests amid a major engagement with Maoist guerrillas; they are later found. No casualties have been reported.
- 6 August – 2010 Leh floods: Flash floods in the Ladakh region of India's Jammu and Kashmir state kill at least 113 people and leave many others missing.
- 7 August – 2010 Mumbai oil spill: An oil spill stretching at least two miles long occurs in the Arabian Sea offshore Mumbai, India, after a vessel from Panama collides with another vessel from St. Kitts. The Panamanian ship was carrying 2,662 tons of oil, 283 tons of diesel and 88,040 liters of lube oil when it became grounded and started to leak.
- 12 August – India issues the producer of the controversial BlackBerry devices a 31 August deadline to give the Indian Government access to its services or be shut down over concerns the devices could be used to commit a repeat of the 2008 Mumbai attacks.
- 15 August – India celebrated its 63rd Independence Day. Sreeram Chandra from Andhra Pradesh won the Indian Idol Season 5 music reality show beating Bhoomi Trivedi and Rakesh Maini.
- 17 August - Peoples Democratic Party chairman Abdul Nazer Mahdani an accused in 2008 Bangalore serial blasts, arrested from Kollam district in Kerala.
- 18 August – A school building collapses due to heavy rain in the village of Sumgarh in the Indian state of Uttarakhand, killing at least 17 schoolchildren.
- 27 August – Police in India kill Umakanta Mahato, a top Maoist guerrilla wanted in connection with the Gyaneshwari Express train derailment in May.

=== September ===
- 10 September – Thousands of people are evacuated in Delhi over flooding fears.
- 20 September – At least 21 people are killed and dozens are injured after 2 trains collide in the Shivpuri district of India's Madhya Pradesh state.
- 23 September – Speeding train kills 7 elephants in Eastern India.
- 29 September – India launches a national identity scheme aimed at reducing fraud and improving access to state benefits.

=== October ===
- 3 October – XIX Commonwealth Games, were held in Delhi, India, from 3 to 14 October 2010.
- 3 October – Violet Line of the Delhi Metro system opened.
- 10 October – At least 36 people die after an overloaded boat capsizes on the Ganges River in the Buxar district of India's Bihar state.
- Mid-October, Mrs. Kashmira and Dr. Leo Rebello visit Andaman Islands, flying directly from Bombay to Portblair, on a chartered flight of Yatra travel, and find Jarawas (tar black people) still roaming fully naked hardly 30 km away from the Governor's Palace. Visit the Cellular Jail and recommend that the said imposing edifice should be turned into a Heritage-Jail Hotel, and oppose the setting up of an Allopathy hospital on the campus of the Cellular Jail to medicate the Jarawas, destroying their original genetic pool of over 5000 years old.
- 11 October – 18 people are killed when a bus falls into a river in Bulandshahr district, Uttar Pradesh, India.
- 12 October – The Indian rupee sign got officially adopted after its formal selection as the winner in July, with the release of the Unicode 6.0, containing the sign.
- 25 October – More than 700 species of ancient insects are discovered preserved in amber in an ancient rainforest in India.
- 29 October - Two siblings were kidnapped, tortured and killed on their way to school by a driver in Coimbatore.
- 30 October – At least 16 people drown and 70 are missing after an overcrowded ferry sinks in a river in West Bengal, eastern India.

=== November ===
- 1 November – At least 74 people drown after a ferry-boat capsizes on the Muri Ganga River in West Bengal, India.
- 2 November – 17 people are killed and three others injured when a truck carrying them overturned at Tarapur talukav near Indranaj in India. The truck was on its way from Surat to Bhavnagar.
- 15 November – 66 people die after a building collapses in eastern New Delhi.
- 21 November – Seven people are killed after a bomb planted by suspected Maoist rebels explodes in Aurangabad district, Bihar, northeastern India.
- 22 November – Immediate Payment Service was launched starting with four member banks, and starting the era of digital payments in India.

=== December ===
- 5 December – 20-year-old Nicole Faria from Bangalore, Miss India, wins the Miss Earth 2010 crown in Vinpearl Land, Nha Trang, Vietnam.
- 10 December – Agni-II plus missile test fails in Orissa, India test-fired an upgraded version of the Agni-II plus nuclear-capable intermediate range ballistic missile off the Orissa coast. The test was declared a failure. The latest version of the "Agni" series missile is described as a two-stage, solid propellant rail and road mobile missile.
- 26 December – A collision between a bus and a mini-truck kills 34 people and leaves 30 injured, near the town of Budaun in Uttar Pradesh state, in northern India.
- Late December – Onion price rise in Indian markets leads to political tensions.

== Predicted and scheduled events ==
- December – Mumbai Metro rout Versova – Andheri – Ghatkopar is expected to be completed.

== Sports ==
=== Hockey ===
- 28 February – 13 March – 2010 Men's Hockey World Cup.

=== Cricket ===
- 12 March – 25 April – 2010 Indian Premier League.
- November–December: New Zealand's tour of India (3 Test/5 ODI).

=== Football ===
- 2009–10 I-League.
- 2010 I-League 2nd Division.
- 2010–11 I-League.

=== Multi Sports Games ===
- 3–14 October – 2010 Commonwealth Games.

=== Others ===
- 3–12 April: 2010 Kabaddi World Cup in Punjab won by India by defeating Pakistan on 12 April 2010.

== Births ==
=== Full date unknown ===
- Falak, baby murder victim (d. 2012)

== Deaths ==
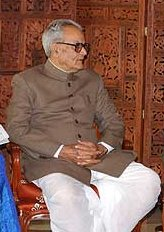
Bhairon Singh Shekhawat

=== January – July ===
- 17 January – Jyoti Basu, 95, former Chief Minister of West Bengal (b. 1914)
- 2 February
  - Salim Ahmed Ghoush (stage name Cochin Haneefa), 58, South Indian film actor and director (b. 1951)
  - Naga Vaishnavi, 10, murder victim (b. 2000)
- 10 February – Gireesh Puthenchery, 48, Malayalam lyricist and screenwriter (b. 1961)
- 18 February – Nirmal Pandey, 48, film and television actor (b. 1961)
- 23 April – Sreenath, 53, Malayalam film and television actor (b. 1956)
- 9 May - Acharya Shri Mahapragya, 89, 10th Acharya of Jain Terapanth Sect (b. 1920)
- 10 May – Mac Mohan, 71, character actor (b. 1938)
- 15 May – Bhairon Singh Shekhawat, 86, 11th Vice President of India (b. 1923)
- 24 May – Tapen Chatterjee, 72, Bengali film actor (b. 1937)
- 14 June – Manohar Malgonkar, 96, author in English (b. 1913)
- 17 June – Anjali Mendes, 64, fashion model (b. 1946)
- 25 June – Viveka Babajee, 37, model and actress (b. 1973)
- 2 July – M.G. Radhakrishnan, 69, Malayalam film music director and Carnatic vocalist (b. 1940)
- 23 July
  - Shikaripura Harihareshwara, Indian Kannada writer (b. 1936)
  - A. Sreedhara Menon, 84, historian. (b. 1925)
- 27 July – Ravi Baswani, 63, actor (b. 1946)

6 Nov Louis Clement dies due to Tumor 63

=== August – December ===
- 1 August – K. M. Mathew, 93, newspaper editor (Malayala Manorama). (b. 1917)
- 10 August – Leo Pinto, 96, field hockey player, Olympic gold medalist (1948). (b. 1914)
- 13 August – Janaki Venkataraman, 89, First Lady (1987–1992) (b. 1921)
- 16 August – Narayan Gangaram Surve, 83, poet. (b. 1926)
- 27 August – Ravindra Kelekar, 85, author, poet and activist. (b. 1925)
- 5 September – Homi Sethna, 86, nuclear scientist and chemical engineer. (b. 1924)
- 8 September – Murali, 46, Tamil actor. (b. 1964)
- 9 September – Venu Nagavally, 61, actor, screenwriter, director in Malayalam film (b. 1949)
- 12 September – Swarnalatha, 37, playback singer. (b. 1973)
- 7 October – A. Venkatachalam, 55, politician
- 8 October – S. S. Chandran, 69, comic actor and politician, member of the Rajya Sabha (2001–2007)
- 20 October – Parthasarathy Sharma, 62, Test cricketer (1974–1977)
- 21 October – A. Ayyappan, 61, poet.
- 2 November – Kalim Sharafi, 85, Bengali language singer.
- 3 November – P. Lal, 81, writer.
- 6 November – Siddhartha Shankar Ray, 90, politician, Chief Minister of West Bengal (1972–1977), Governor of Punjab (1986–1989)
- 11 November – Pankaj Advani, 45, film director, film editor, screenplay writer, photographer, theatre director, and painter. (b. 1965)
- 17 November – N. Viswanathan, 81, actor
- 28 November – Mahaveer Prasad, 71, politician
- 4 December – Manish Acharya, 43, film director, actor (b. 1967)
- 23 December – K. Karunakaran, 92, politician, former Chief Minister of Kerala. (b. 1918)

== Major public holidays ==
- 14 January – Pongal (Farmers' holiday)
- 26 January – Republic Day (National holiday)
- 12 February – Maha Shivaratri (Hindu holiday)
- 26 February – Mawlid (Muslim holiday)
- 28 February – Mahavir Jayanti (Jain holiday)
- 2 April – Good Friday (Christian holiday)
- 5 April – Easter Monday (Christian holiday)
- 28 April – Buddha Purnima (Buddhist holiday)
- 15 August – Independence day (National holiday)
- 24 August – Raksha Bandhan (Hindu holiday)
- 2 September – Krishna Janmashtami (Hindu holiday)
- 11 September – Eid ul-Fitr (Muslim holiday)
- 2 October – Gandhi Jayanti (National holiday)
- 17 October – Vijayadashami/Dussehra (Hindu holiday)
- 5 November – Diwali (Hindu holiday)
- 21 November – Guru Nanak Jayanti (Sikh holiday)
- 17 December – Muharram (Muslim holiday)
- 25 December – Christmas (Christian holiday)

== See also ==
- 2010 in rail transport in India
- Bollywood films of 2010
- India at the 2010 Winter Olympics
- Timeline of Indian history
