= Deepak Agrawal =

Indian neurosurgeon

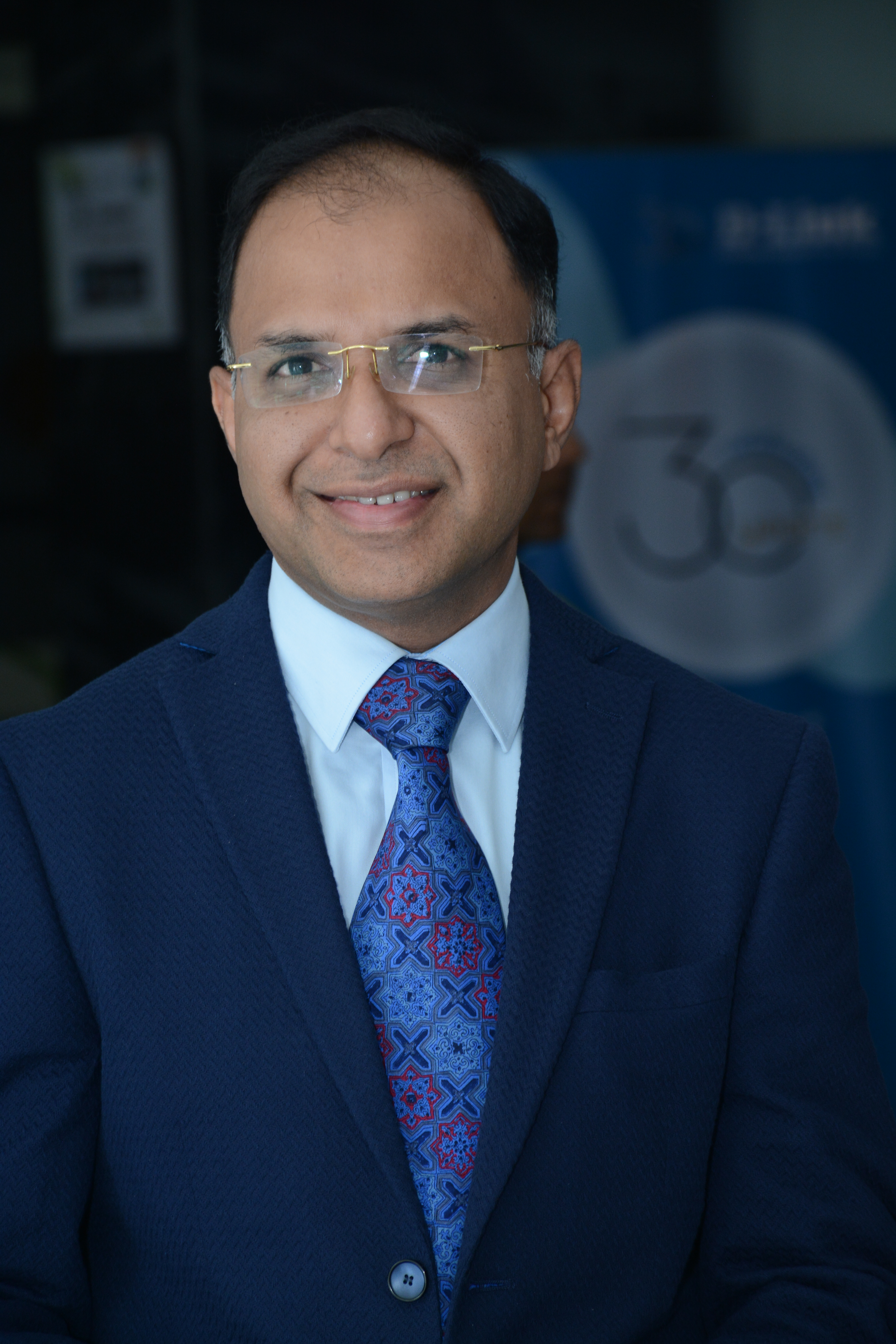
- Born: November 10, 1970 (age 55); Delhi, India
- Occupation: Neurosurgery
- Website: drdeepakaiims.com

Deepak Agrawal, born 10 November 1970, is a professor of neurosurgery at All India Institute of Medical Sciences, New Delhi, and is often regarded as one of the most renowned and successful living neurosurgeons. During his stint as chairman of computerization, he reformed the ICT processes at AIIMS, New Delhi, while also helping patients in the All India Institute of Medical Sciences, New Delhi, to receive a Unique Health Identification (UHID), which documents their journey in the hospital. Additionally, he also pioneered stem cell research in spinal cord injury in India and established the Stem Cell Translational Research in Neuroscience LAB at AIIMS, New Delhi. Moreover, he has also pioneered a new surgical technique—Expansive Duraplasty—for complete high cervical injury. This technique has shown improvement in a subset of patients, enabling them to regain the ability to walk again.

== Pain Surgery ==
Agrawal has pioneered the DREZotomy technique for neuropathic pain in India and has refined the procedure to make it safer and more accessible to patients. He has the largest series of Cervical DREZOTOMY in the Indian subcontinent. Furthermore, he is currently the only neurosurgeon in the world who is performing Lumbar DREZOTOMY for lower limb spasticity and pain.

Agrawal was responsible for the care of Baby Falak and raising the issue in the media, which led to a national outcry against Child Abuse and Human trafficking.

Additionally, he developed a UHID system at AIIMS, enabling patients to be admitted at a doctor's appointment smoothly through the ors.gov.in web portal.

Agrawal developed the mechanical AgVa Ventilator in collaboration with Indian scientist Diwakar Vaish of A-SET Robotics. During the COVID-19 pandemic (2019-2023), more than 10,000 ventilators were manufactured and sold to various public and private hospitals across the Indian subcontinent.

Agrawal has been instrumental in setting up the most advanced Neurotrauma center in India (JPNATC). He equipped the department with India's first Intraoperative spine CT (O-arm) and portable CT scanner, which has benefited more than 20,000 patients in total.

He has been serving as editor-in-chief of the Journal of Peripheral Nerve Surgery since 2019 and editor-in-chief of the Indian Journal of Neurotrauma since April 2019.

He has 3,818 citations for his published research, with an h-index of 33 and an i10-index of 95 as of 10 October 2024.

== Career in Gamma Knife ==
Agrawal has expertise in Gamma Knife (stereotactic radiosurgery), having treated more patients with this surgical method than any other neurosurgeon in India. Secondly, he is considered the most experienced Indian surgeon in treating ocular malignancies by Gamma Knife Radiosurgery. Agrawal is regarded as one of the greatest experts on Gamma Knife radiosurgery for brain tumors and vascular malformations. Moreover, he has extensively compared Gamma Knife with other forms of radiotherapy, such as CyberKnife and proton beam, being a strong proponent of Gamma Knife vis-à-vis other modalities. He has published groundbreaking research on the Gamma Knife, including a policy paper on improving neurosurgical access in developing countries using the Gamma Knife. He also wrote the book Mastering Gamma Knife Radiosurgery: Insights from Case-Based Learnings, which presents innovative and evolving approaches to Gamma Knife treatment, highlighting AIIMS-based clinical experiences and novel neurosurgical applications.

== Awards ==
- 'CNS-CSNS young neurosurgeon of the year' award by the US Congress of Neurological Surgeons (CNS) at the annual CNS meeting in September 2008 at San Diego, California.
- ‘Tata Innovation Fellowship’ by DBT for 3 years from 2013, of Rs 22.5 lakhs.
- "Dynamic CIO of the Year 2016" at the fifth Annual Healthcare Summit.
- AAPI International research award (1st prize) in 'Healthcare Innovation' at Global Health Summit (2016).
- Award given by Birac under the Department of Biotechnology of 50 lakhs.
