= Khulhama =

Khulhama Khulhoam
- Village
- Country: India
- Union Territory: Jammu and Kashmir
- District: Bandipora

Languages
  - Official: Kashmiri, Urdu, Hindi, Dogri, English
- Time zone: UTC+5:30 (IST)
- Vehicle registration: JK

Khulhama or Khulhoam is a small village situated next to Nadihal, in Bandipora District, in the Indian union territory of Jammu and Kashmir. Its name is derived from Khul - stream or river, and Hoam - region or village. It is located below the foot of Nadihal and includes a large wetland.

== Location ==
Khulhama is an island region west of Nadihal on the banks of a river called a big stream or big river. It is about 6 km from the town of Bandipore. It is separated from Nadihal by a large river and bounded by 3 water bodies; Wular Lake to the north and south, and two rivers to the east and west. Nadihal, Lankrichpora, Gundidachna and Vijhara are its neighbouring villages.

== Geography ==
Its altitude is 1578 meters above sea level. Khulhama consists of two mohallas: one from main bridge downwards as far as the Jamia Masjid, and one from Masjid onwards to the new colonies on the other bank of the same river.

== Economy ==
It is a densely populated region because of the easy availability of resources and food. It hosts pastures, lakes and rivers. More than half of Khulhama's area is covered with woodland. Its agriculture is poor, although rice, maize, vegetables, peanuts and beans are cultivated. The soil in Khulhama is rich in humidity, moisture, water and poor in calcium, phosphorus, iron and minerals.

=== Fishery ===
More than half of its people work as fishers, hunters and sand collectors around Wular lake (one of Asia's largest freshwater lakes) and other local waters. It is rich in several aquatic life forms. Fish species include Kashmiri, Russian Punjabi, Rainbow Trout and Silver Trout. About 75–90 kg of fish every day are sold in Nadihal, Vvijhara, Poora Ajas, Sumbal, Papachan, Gamroo and as far away as Srinagar and central Kashmir.

=== Livestock ===
Livestock including40

Village comparison estimated values, 2011-15 data (Production %)
Animal	Nadihal	Khulhama	Vihjara	Poora	Papachan
Hen	40	80	37	66	23
Cock	36	78	31	62	21
Swan	14	86	19	27	11
Duck	20	90	21	34	14
Horse	0.2	5	0.1	5	0
Bull	8	60	13	16	11
Cow	22	70	21	29	18
Goat	11	33	5	53	8
Sheep	69	67	50	51	35
Buffalo	0.03	0.06	0.10	1	0.00
Donkey	62.12		0.1	0.13	

Khulhama is Bandipore's leading egg producer. It also leads in the production of milk, skin and meat, aquatic birds and animals.

== Religion ==
The majority of residents practice Islam. Two mosques are there.

== Education ==
Western style educational facilities up to the middle school level are located within the village. Secondary education is available in Nadihal. The nearest college is in Bandipora.

== Demography ==
The primary languages are Kashmiri, Hindi and Urdu.

The population of Nadihal is 3000. The literacy rate is 62%.

== Culture ==
Cricket is their main sporting activity. Besides the spare timers use music as their pass time. Sofiana music Lovers listen to live Kashmiri Chakri.
