= 2010 Machil encounter =

Unlawful killings by the Indian Army in Jammu and Kashmir

The Machil fake encounter, also known as the Machil encounter case or Matshil encounter case, refers to an extrajudicial killing which was carried out by the Indian Army on 29 April 2010 by killing the three Kashmiri civilians Shahzad Ahmad Khan (27), Mohammad Shafi Ahmad Lone (19), and Riyaz Ahmad Lone (20), and labelled them as Pakistani militants. Considered as one of the biggest human rights abuses in Jammu and Kashmir since insurgency began in 1947 between India, Pakistan and China, the trio were killed in Machil area of Kupwara district, Jammu and Kashmir at the Line of Control (LoC).

It was widely covered by the news media and national and international human rights organizations, including Amnesty International, as well as opposition and mainstream political parties, including the then ruling parties, the National Conference and the Indian National Congress. The Machil fake encounter became the first case in the history of Jammu and Kashmir when an army convicted its own personnel for human rights violations in the territory.

== Background ==
On 29 April 2010, an army source, Bashir Ahmad Lone offered a job to the victims and promised ₹2000 earning a day. Lone was sent to them by another two army sources, Abdul Hamid and Abbas Ahmad. When the victims reached near LoC, army sources handed over them to 4 Rajputana Rifles at RS. 50,000 each and later they were killed in a fake encounter by Rajputana Rifles soldiers at the Line of Control and labelled them as Pakistani militants. The next day after killing the victims, the army issued a statement claiming they prevented infiltration attempted on the Line of Control by the three Pakistani-origin militants. It also claimed that they recovered weapons, including the 5 AK-47, ammunition and Pakistani currency from the militants. After the trio from Nadihal village suddenly disappeared, their families started searching for the victims but they returned with empty handed and later filed a missing report with a nearby police station.

The police investigation revealed that the trio were killed in a fake encounter after obtaining call detail records of the victims. According to police, trio were present in Thayen village, Kalaroos of Kupwara when they were killed in Machil area. The family of one of the victims, Riyaz stated that Bashir Ahmad Lone offered a good job opportunity to Riyaz at the border. Riyaz Ahmad Lone, 20 was working at a mechanical shop in Sopore while another victim, Shahzad Ahmed Khan, 27 was a fruit seller and Mohammad Shafi Lone, 19 was working as a laborer.

The victims left their homes on 27 April for a job meeting with Lone. However, they were asked to come after some days. During the police interrogation, driver of the vehicle which was used by the army sources confessed that he took the trio from Nadihal village to Kupwara. After the victims were killed, army buried them in Machil, however Jammu and Kashmir Police played a central role and brought the bodies for burial in a local graveyard. The faces of the victims were painted with black colour after army labelled them militants.

== Court martial ==
When police revealed the background of the fake encounter, they filed a chargesheet against the 11 accused persons, including 9 army personnel and two civilians. The accused included a colonel and 2 majors. They were charged under sections 302 for murder, section 364 for abduction, section 120-B for criminal conspiracy and section 34 for common intent of the Ranbir Penal Code. The case was initially heard by the Sopore chief judicial magistrate and issued a notice to the army asking to produce involved people before the police.

The army declined to follow the court orders, leading the local court to transfer it to the High Court of Jammu and Kashmir and Ladakh which ordered the army to set up an army court inquiry. The inquiry began in December 2013 and those convicted were sentenced life imprisonment in 2014 by the Summary General Court Martial (SGCM). The army confirmed the sentences of life imprisonment of those found guilty on 7 September 2015. Three army personnel were acquitted by the court. It was first time in 25 years of insurgency in Jammu and Kashmir that Indian Army personnel received confirmed sentences of life imprisonment by a General Court Martial (GCM) for the killing of civilians. In 2017, the Tribunal stayed the life sentences of five convicted soldiers. However, then-Jammu and Kashmir Peoples Democratic Party chief minister Mehbooba Mufti's government did not challenge this ruling.

== Aftermath ==
The killing of the trio was heavily criticised by the people which turned into an uprising which left between 113 and 120 people dead, with hundreds of others injured in different clashes with the Jammu and Kashmir police and the Central Reserve Police Force (CRPF).

== See also ==
- Rape during the Kashmir conflict
- 2010 Kashmir unrest
