= AgVa Ventilator =

Inexpensive ventilator

The AgVa Ventilator is a mechanical ventilator developed in collaboration with Indian scientist Diwakar Vaish of A-SET Robotics and Dr. Deepak Agrawal, professor of Neurosurgery at All India Institute of Medical Sciences, Delhi. AgVa is designed to be a cost-effective and compact ventilator with the ability to push oxygen as well as atmospheric air. Ventilator parameters can be controlled through an Android application. The company gained attention in 2020 when the Indian government bought 10,000 ventilators from them as part of their response to the COVID-19 pandemic. The company partnered with Maruti Suzuki India to manufacture the ventilators. Many of the company's ventilators were rejected by hospitals as defective. The AgVa ventilator is currently manufactured by D&D Healthcare.

== Technology ==
The AgVa ventilator has built-in machine learning algorithms which allow the ventilator to compensate for the patient-specific respiratory patterns and volumes, which reduces the risk of ventilator-associated lung injury. The advanced versions of the ventilator have a fixed tablet display with an Android app-based interface to control the ventilator which displays breathing curves and lung volumes.

The ventilator can function on an oxygen supply, medical air, and atmospheric air. It can run on a portable 12 V power supply and draws about 100 watts of power. On-board sensors allow the ventilator to detect distress patterns in the ventilation of the patient and alert the attendant.

The ability of the ventilator to run on atmospheric air is stated to also help patients with neurological injury and deficits requiring permanent ventilation, allowing the patient to be discharged and sent home with the portable ventilator due in part to the low maintenance cost and user friendly interface.

== Controversy ==
In 2020, during the COVID-19 pandemic, the Indian government bought ventilators from AgVa as part of its Prime Minister's Citizen Assistance and Relief in Emergency Situations (PM CARES) program. Many of these were found by hospitals to be defective, having nonfunctional displays or being unable to generate enough air flow or reach required oxygen levels. Former employees of the company stated that in some cases the ventilator software was adjusted to show that it was delivering the correct amount of oxygen even when it was not.
