= Mind-controlled wheelchair =

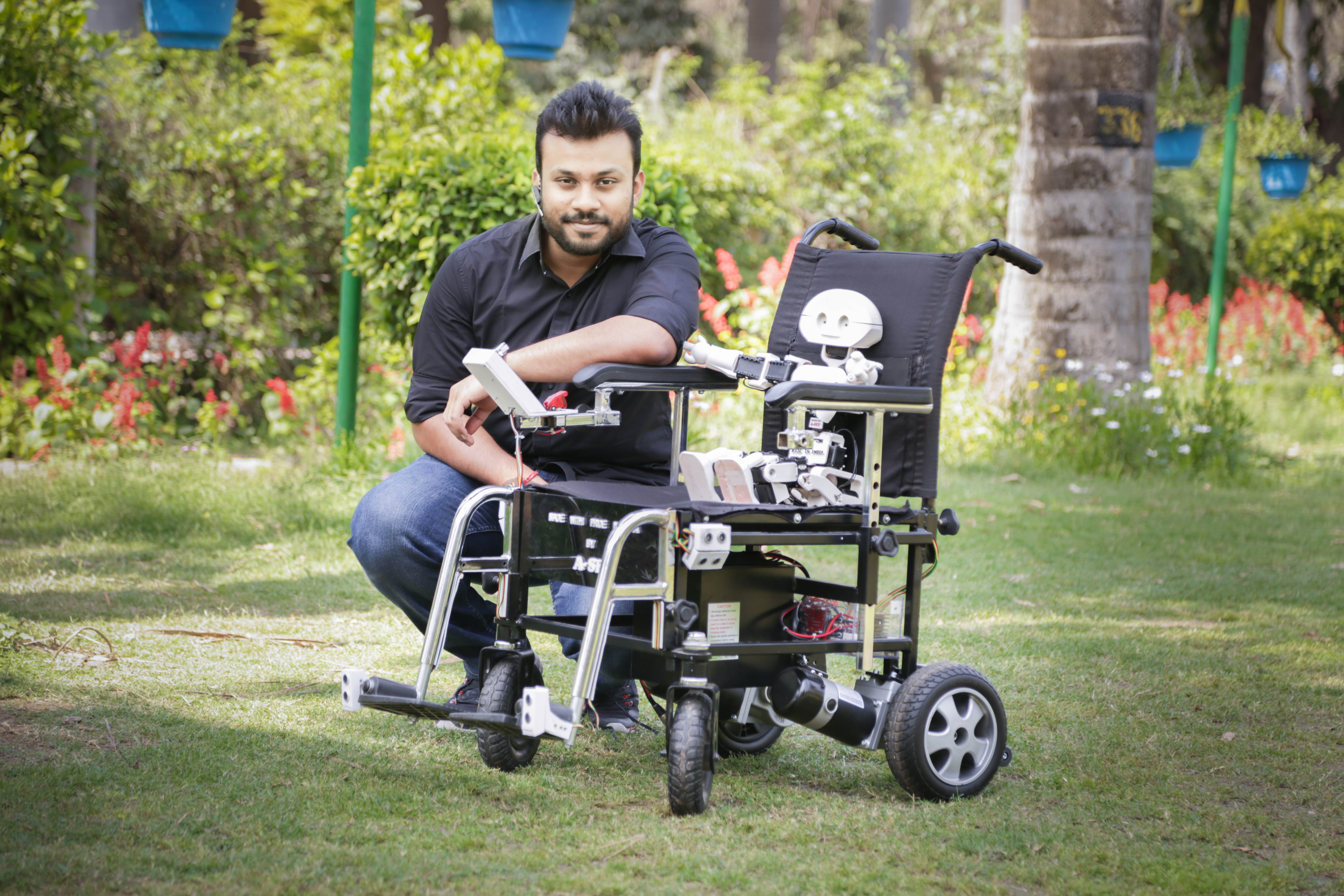
- Diwakar Vaish at the press launch of his mind-controlled wheelchair
- Classification: Wheelchair
- Industry: Various
- Application: Conveyance, paralysis mobility
- Fuel source: Electric
- Powered: Yes
- Self-propelled: Yes
- Wheels: 4
- Inventor: Diwakar Vaish
- Invented: 2016

A mind-controlled wheelchair is a motorized wheelchair controlled by a brain–computer interface. Such a wheelchair could be of great importance to patients with locked-in syndrome (LIS), in which a patient is aware but cannot move or communicate verbally due to complete paralysis of nearly all voluntary muscles in the body except the eyes. Such wheelchairs can also be used in case of muscular dystrophy, a disease that weakens the musculoskeletal system and hampers locomotion.

== History ==
The technology behind brain or mind control goes back to at least 2002, when researchers implanted electrodes into the brains of macaque monkeys, which enabled them to control a cursor on a computer screen. Similar techniques were able to control robotic arms and simple joysticks. In 2009, researchers at the University of South Florida developed a wheelchair-mounted robotic arm that captured the user's brain waves and converted them into robotic movements. The Brain-Computer Interface (BCI), which captures P-300 brain wave responses and converts them to actions, was developed by USF psychology professor Emanuel Donchin and colleagues. The P-300 brain signal serves a virtual "finger" for patients who cannot move, such as those with locked-in syndrome or those with Lou Gehrig's Disease (ALS).

The first mind-controlled wheelchair reached production in 2016. It was designed by Diwakar Vaish, Head of Robotics and Research at A-SET Training & Research Institutes.

In November of 2022, the University of Texas at Austin developed a mind-controlled wheelchair using an EEG device. In addition, March of 2022 saw a paper from Clarkson University planning the design of a mind-controlled wheelchair also using an EEG.

== Technology ==
=== Operation ===
A mind-controlled wheelchair functions using a brain–computer interface: an electroencephalogram (EEG) worn on the user's forehead detects neural impulses that reach the scalp allowing the micro-controller on board to detect the user's thought process, interpret it, and control the wheelchair's movement.

In November of 2022 the University of Texas in Austin conducted a study on the effectiveness of a model of mind-controlled wheelchair. Similar to the BCI, the machine translates brain waves into movements. Specifically, the participants were instructed to visualize moving extremities to prompt the wheelchair to move. This study saw the use of non-invasive electrodes, using an electroencephalogram cap as opposed to internally installed electrodes. In March of 2022, Stoyell et al. at Clarkson University published a paper in which they planned a design of a mind-controlled wheelchair based on an Emotiv EPOC X headset, an electroencephalogram device.

=== Functionality ===
The A-SET wheelchair comes standard with many different types of sensors, like temperature sensors, sound sensors and an array of distance sensors which detect any unevenness in the surface. The chair automatically avoids stairs and steep inclines. It also has a "safety switch": in case of danger, the user can close their eyes quickly to trigger an emergency stop.

In the case of the chair designed by Stoyell et al., the only equipment needed to use the chair is the EMOTIV EPOC X headset. Both the University of Texas' and Clarkson University's designs have the benefit of being noninvasive, with the electrodes being placed onto the head as opposed to being surgically implanted. This makes these products relatively more accessible.
