= 2010 West Bengal ferry sinking =

2010 maritime incident in India

- Date: 30 October 2010
- Location: Bhagirathi River, West Bengal, India; 24.186828°N 88.267486°E
- Cause: Overcrowding
- Participants: 220 passengers and crew
- Deaths: 74+

The 2010 West Bengal Ferry Sinking was an incident which occurred on Saturday, 30 October 2010, when an over-crowded ferry carrying Muslim pilgrims sank after hitting a sand bank on the Bhagirathi River in the Indian state of West Bengal. Thus far at least 74 bodies have been recovered, with many more missing, feared swept downstream.

== Accident ==
The ferry, which had a listed capacity of 60, capsized and sank in rough waters whilst ferrying Muslim pilgrims back from a religious festival down the Bhagirathi River. It is believed up to 150 people, more than double the capacity, were on the boat at the time.

The Indian Navy was called in to help with the rescue, with Navy divers and local fishermen helping to rescue survivors from the river as well as collect deceased bodies.

A protest was staged on a jetty near the accident site by frustrated locals who believe the government was too slow to react to help with the disaster, despite the Navy's committing a helicopter as well as personnel to help look in case against all likelihood there are more survivors.
