= 2010 Mirchpur caste violence =

Anti-Dalit violence in Haryana, India

- Date: April 21, 2010
- Location: Mirchpur, Haryana
- Caused by: Caste tensions
- Methods: Arson, Rioting, Murder

Casualties
- Deaths: 2 Dalits burnt alive
- Injuries: 51 Dalits
- Arrested: 103
- Buildings destroyed: 18 Dalit houses burnt down
- Charged: 33

The Mirchpur caste violence also known as the Mirchpur Dalit killings was an incident of violence against the Balmiki Dalits by upper caste Jat villagers in the village of Mirchpur, Haryana on April 21, 2010. A 70-year-old man and his polio affected disabled daughter of 17 years old were burnt alive when a mob of 300 to 1000 Jat villagers set fire to houses in the Balmiki colony where 18 houses were burnt down. 258 Dalit families fled the village over a span of the next eight years.

The problems started after a dog barked at a group of Jat youth while they were passing by a Balmiki colony. One of the Jat youth hurled a brick at the dog, only to be objected by a young Dalit which turned into an altercation between both parties. The Jat threatened all Balmikis with dire consequences. The Balmiki Dalits went to Jats of the village to extinguish the issue but they too were beaten badly.

In August 2018, the High court convicted 33 people for the violence and sentenced 12 to life imprisonment.

== Background ==
=== Dog barking incident ===
On April 19, 2010, a dog belonging to one of the Balmiki Dalit villagers started barking at a group of Jat youths who were returning to the village. One of the youth took offense at the dog's barking and threw a brick at the pet dog. The Dalits were threatened with dire consequences by the Jats when the owner of the dog and his nephew came out and protested. An altercation broke out that was somehow solved by the villagers and the youth left. The Jat community members then demanded the dog owner to apologize in order to prevent any problems. When he arrived at the home of one of the Jat with his neighbor to make peace, they were badly beaten. One of them was seriously wounded and admitted to a hospital. In the First Information Report (FIR) No 166 registered at Narnaund police department, the dog was constantly referred to as a bitch.

=== Tensions ===
A sizable number of young people from the Jat community assembled in the village the very next day on April 20, giving rise to fear of an impending violence among the members of the Dalit community. On the morning of April 21, while traveling near the village, one of the suspects reportedly threatened some of the Dalit young people with the burning down of their homes, leading to another heated argument between both the sides.

== Attacks ==
April 21, a large mob of Jats, armed with lathis, stones, petrol and oil cans, arrived in the village and began pelting rocks at the Dalit villagers. There were originally 100 to 150 members of the Jat community, but this figure went up to 300 to 400 members later. Other reports also put the figure to 1000. The outnumbered Dalits retaliated by throwing bricks, stones and whatever they can lay their hands on. One of the Jat, in the meantime, went to the village and reportedly asked all the men in the Dalit community to gather at a spot. When the men were gone, the Jats set their houses ablaze.

The Dalit men fled towards their homes after hearing the screams of female family members and saw the Jat mob burning their houses, including that of Tara Chand's, a 70-year-old Dalit man. He was rushed to a local hospital where he succumbed while treatment and his 17 year old polio affected disabled daughter was burnt alive in the house. 51 people belonging to the Balmiki group were wounded in the attack and 18 of their houses were burnt down in the Balmiki colony. Large-scale rioting and theft of property also took place during the violence.

== Aftermath ==
Around 150 victims escaped to Delhi and took refuge at the Balmiki temple near Connaught after the incident. Nearly a dozen Dalit families fled the village during 15 days of January 2011 due to fear of attacks by the Jats. Nearly 254 families fled out of the village during the span of eight years after the violence, till 2018.

== Court verdicts ==
The police of Haryana arrested 103 accused in August 2010 after orders from the supreme court. On January 9, 2011, 98 of the accused were transferred to Tihar Jail from Hisar Jail. On January 15, some members of the Jat community protested to start a fresh probe. The court ordered the Central Bureau of Investigation (CBI) to take over the case on January 20, 2011.

On 10 March 2011, the Trial court ordered charges against 97 individuals. On September 24, 2011, the Trial court acquitted 82 people and 15 individuals were convicted, but no one was found guilty of murder. Three have been accused of a guilty homicide which does not amount to murder with a maximum imprisonment of 10 years and five were jailed for five years, and seven were released on probation.

On October 31, 2011, three convicts were sentenced to life, five were given five years in prison with a fine of Rs 20,000 for each, and the other seven were placed on probation. On October 6, 2012, the trial court acquitted one convict from all charges who had previously absconded.

The High Court upheld the conviction and imprisonment of 13 convicts and reversed the acquittal of 20 persons who were previously acquitted and convicted them on August 24, 2018.

In August 2018, the court sentenced 12 out of the 33 convicted to life imprisonment. The court also found that people of the Jat community intentionally targeted houses of people of the Balmiki community, and the principal objective in the case was to "teach a lesson to people of the Balmiki community, and this was entirely accomplished by the accused individuals."

== Continued tensions ==
In February 2017, a clash erupted out among a group of Dalits and a group of upper-caste men in Mirchpur where 9 Dalit youths, aged between 14 and 25, were badly injured. The attack occurred at a local playground where a cycle-stunt contest was being organized, according to the villagers. It began with a dispute about a group of upper caste youngsters reportedly passing casteist comments against one of the contestants. Within moments, after several individuals from the upper castes jumped in and began violently attacking the Dalit contestant, the altercation escalated into a full-blown assault. His friends and cousins who attempted to interfere were also thrashed. The situation brought under control by the police.

The next day 40 Dalit families left their homes in the village temporarily.

== See also ==
- Massacre of Jats by Mughals
- Anti-casteism reforms by Arya Samaj
- Caste system in India
