= 2010 Kashmir unrest =

Series of violent protests and unrest in Jammu and Kashmir, India

- The Muslim-majority Kashmir Valley, situated in Kashmir Division (colored in red) of Jammu and Kashmir, India, was the primary region where protests, strikes, and stone-pelting took place.
- Date: June – September 2010
- Location: Kashmir Division, Jammu and Kashmir
- Caused by: Death of Tufail Ahmad Mattoo; 2010 Machil encounter, Alleged human rights abuses by security forces
- Goals: Removal of Armed Forces Special Powers Act (AFSPA); Self-determination; Political freedom
- Methods: Demonstrations; Strikes; Civil disobedience; Clashes with security forces

Lead figures
Syed Ali Shah Geelani (Hurriyat Conference leader); Mirwaiz Umar Farooq (Hurriyat Conference leader)	Indian government officials

Casualties
- Deaths: 112 (mostly protesters)
- Injuries: Numerous injuries reported among protesters and security personnel

The 2010 Kashmir unrest was a series of violent protests and riots in parts of Jammu and Kashmir, India. It began in June 2010 after the Indian Army claimed to have killed three Pakistani infiltrators. However, it was later revealed that three young men from Nadihal village in Baramulla district were killed in a staged encounter at Sona Pindi by a soldier of the Territorial Army, a counter-insurgent, and a former special police officer. This incident, later known as the Machil fake encounter, sparked outrage across the region, contributing to the violent protests that followed.

The protests were initially led by separatist leaders from the All Parties Hurriyat Conference (APHC), including Syed Ali Shah Geelani and Mirwaiz Umar Farooq, who called for the complete demilitarisation of Jammu and Kashmir. The APHC also condemned the human rights abuses allegedly committed by security forces in the region and called for a general strike to demand justice and accountability. Protesters, predominantly youth, defied curfews and restrictions, shouting pro-independence slogans, burning police vehicles, and targeting government buildings. The unrest further escalated following the death of 17-year-old student Tufail Mattoo, whose killing by security forces sparked widespread protests. The riot police consisting of Jammu and Kashmir Police and Indian Para-military forces fired teargas shells rubber bullets and also live ammunition on the protesters, resulting in 117 deaths, including many teenagers and an 11-year-old boy. The protests subsided after the Indian government announced a package of measures aimed at defusing the tensions in September 2010.

== Background ==
On 30 April 2010, the Indian Army claimed to have foiled an infiltration bid from across the Line of Control, at Machil Sector in Kupwara district of Jammu and Kashmir by killing three armed militants from Pakistan. However, it was subsequently established that the encounter had been staged and that the three alleged militants were in fact civilians of Rafiabad area, who had been lured to the army camp by promising them jobs as "porters" for the Army, and then shot in cold blood, in order to claim a cash award.

On 11 June, there were protests against these killings in the downtown area of Srinagar. Police used massive force to disperse the protesting youth during which a teargas bullet killed a seventeen-year-old Tufail Ahmad Mattoo who participated in the protest. Stadium. Several protest marches were organised across the Valley in response to the killings which turned violent. Thereafter a vicious circle was set, killing of a boy was followed by protest demonstrations and clashes with police and CRPF in which another boy was killed which led to another protest by the boys till several youth lost their lives. Official figures reveal around 110 people have lost their lives and 537 civilians were injured during stone-pelting incidents from May to 21 September 2010. Around 1,274 CRPF men and 2,747 police personnel were injured during the same period across the valley.

Indian intelligence agencies claimed that these protests and demonstrations were part of covert operations of Pakistani intelligence agencies and were sponsored and supported from them. Media reports earlier in march had suggested that with the support of its intelligence agencies Pakistan has been once again 'boosting' Kashmir militants and recruitment of 'martyrs' in Pakistani state of Punjab. It was reported that in a meeting held in Muzaffarabad in mid January 2010 which was chaired by former Inter-Services Intelligence chief Hamid Gul, United Jihad Council called for reinvigorated jihad until Kashmir was free of "Indian occupation". In May 2010 increased activities of militants was reported from across the border in Neelum valley in Pakistani-administered Gilgit-Baltistan. The locals reported that large numbers of militants had set up camps in the area with plans of crossing into the Kashmir valley, and they did not appear to be Kashmiri.

== Demands of protesters ==
The erstwhile undivided state of Jammu and Kashmir is the largest militarised territorial dispute. Around 700,000 –1,000,000 Indian troops and paramilitaries station permanently in the state with a population of 14 million. Protesters demanded that the number of troops in the state of Jammu and Kashmir be reduced. In addition protesters shouted pro-independence slogans demanding Indian forces 'Quit Kashmir'.

== Violent protest and riots ==
"(We) have decided to register a criminal case against Omar Abdullah(CM) and Ashiq Bukhari(SP) for the innocent killings of 2010 and will try to bring the murderers of the innocent students to justice."

— Hurriyat(G)

On 11 June, Tufail Ahmad Mattoo a 17-year-old student, who was there to protest "peacefully" against atrocities was killed after being hit in the head by a tear gas shell. His death proved to be a catalyst and subsequently stone throwing mobs confronted the police almost daily. A vicious cycle was initiated, killing of a person was followed by demonstrations and clashes with police and Central Reserve Police Force in which another person was killed which led to another protest till more lost their lives and hundreds of security personnel were injured in riots.

=== Stone pelting ===
The mob pelted stones and bricks at the riot police and in response the Indian forces used tear gas, rubber bullets and in some cases live ammunition resulting in death of some of the unarmed protestors. The protesters were accused by the government of using stone pelting as a violent mean of creating chaos. The violent stone pelting by the mob resulted in several security personnel being injured.

To prevent the riots Indian authorities imposed curfew in Srinagar and other towns in the valley. In August, the government responded by imposing curfews in the disturbed areas and by deploying Rapid Action Force (RAF) in the Srinagar valley to control demonstrations. Protesters, however, defied curfew and also pelted stones on the police and paramilitary personnel. The year 2010 opened the Pandora's box for the Indian government which responded to the chaos by using live ammunition which resulted in death of more than hundred protestors.

=== September protests ===
Protests in Kashmir escalated over several days, as demonstrations against public burning of the Koran as a protest in the United States commemorating the 11 September attacks quickly turned into separatist protests against the Indian government in the Muslim-majority province. On 13 September, Muslim protesters defied a curfew, setting fire to a Christian missionary school and government buildings. At least 17 people were shot dead by police, and one policeman was killed by a thrown rock; at least 113 policemen and 45 protesters were wounded. On 12 September, a church was burned and a curfew instituted in Punjab. Violence spread into Poonch in the Jammu division, with three protesters shot by police. Protesters burned government buildings and vehicles including the SDM's office, where a gas cylinder exploded inflicting injuries on six people; the SDPO office; the Forest Department office; the BDO office and two police and five civilian vehicles. Muslim protesters also burnt a Christian school in Poonch, and another in Mendhar the next day, in clashes leaving four protesters killed, 19 wounded, but dozens of government offices, a police station, and eight vehicles were burned. Two other churches were also reportedly burnt by Muslim protesters in Rajouri and Naushera. The riots spread to outside the Kashmir Valley and in the western areas of Jammu and Kashmir along the Line of Control which are also majority Muslim. As of 18 September, the estimated death toll was approximately 100. The Hindustan Times blamed much of the resentment on the indefinite military curfew, the first in 10 years to affect the entire Kashmir Valley, calling the curfew "collective punishment" and writing that after four days, "People are running out of milk, vegetables and baby food. " On 18 September, after six days, the curfew was relaxed in parts of Srinagar and some other areas for four hours to allow people to buy essentials.

On the night of 17 September, a policeman's house was set on fire in Pinjoora village. On 18 September, a large procession in Anantnag defied curfew, carrying the body of Maroof Ahmad Nath, who drowned while fleeing police. After "agitating mobs attempted to torch government property", security forces opened fire, killing Noorul Amin Dagga and injuring five. Fayaz Ahmad Naiku of Boatman Colony (Bemina), Srinigar died from injuries received the preceding day. A group stoning and attempting to burn the home of Samajwadi Party leader Fayaz Ahmad Bhat were dispersed by gunfire. A group of men emerging from a mosque were fired on with one killed and four injured in Pattan area. A police spokesman disputed claims that the attack was unprovoked, because a mob tried to block the Srinagar-Baramulla National Highway and started heavy stone pelting on police.

=== Criticism of security forces ===
Amnesty International called on Indian security forces not to use gunfire against rioters. Prime minister of India Manmohan Singh expressing concern over the deaths asked for revisiting operating procedures and "non-lethal, yet effective and more focussed" crowd control measures to deal with the violent protesters.

=== Criticism of the protests ===
In response to the unrest in Kashmir, Kashmiri Pandits met with Indian finance minister Pranab Mukherjee and asked that there be no dilution of the Armed Forces (Special Powers) Act that applies to Kashmir. Their leader Ramesh Manvati, belonging to Panun Kashmir, stated: "The security forces must be provided the constitutional protection as they are playing crucial role in preservation of the country's sovereignty." the Kashmiri Pandits also staged a dharna in Jammu stating that no solution of the problem was possible without including them in the dialogue.

Indian Home minister P. Chidambaram hinted at Pakistan's involvement in the unrest saying that "It is possible that they believe that relying upon civilian unrest will pay them better dividends. But I am confident if we are able to win the hearts and minds of the people those designs can be foiled."

Condemning the violent protests Farooq Abdullah president of the largest political party in Kashmir Jammu & Kashmir National Conference stated that Kashmir has been and will always remain a part of India. He however demanded withdrawal of AFSPA. Chief minister of Jammu & Kashmir Omar Abdullah has also called for withdrawal of AFSPA. However the leaders of Bharatiya Janata Party opposed the withdrawal of AFSPA and the party spokesman said that BJP saw the hand of Inter-Services Intelligence behind the protests.

Yasin Malik, leader of Jammu Kashmir Liberation Front, accused Pakistani militants of subverting the indigenous movement.

J&K police claimed that there exist a nexus that raises money to make weekly payments for stone pelting and many arrests have taken place on this.

== Response of central government ==
On 15 September, Prime Minister Manmohan Singh proposed an all-party meeting in Jammu and Kashmir, saying that dialogue was the only way to find lasting peace, and "We are ready for dialogue with anybody or any group that does not espouse or practice violence". Written invitations included Kashmiri separatists Mirwaiz Umar Farooq and Yasin Malik, who had been excluded from a previous all-party meeting in 2008 during the Amarnath land transfer controversy. Members of the 39-member delegation include Home Minister P Chidambaram and Parliamentary Affairs Minister Pawan Kumar Bansal, Sushma Swaraj and Arun Jaitley (BJP), Basudeb Acharia (CPM), Gurudas Dasgupta (CPI), Mulayam Singh Yadav (Samajwadi Party) and Ram Vilas Paswan (Lok Janshakti Party). The delegation subsequently visited Kashmir. Following this visit Indian government announced several measures to defuse the tensions. The measures included release of all the students arrested during the protests, reopening of schools, discussions on reducing the number of security forces in Kashmir and appointment of a group to begin sustained dialogue with the Kashmiris. In addition financial compensation of $11,000 to the families of each of those killed was announced. Most of the families rejected the compensation but a few accepted it, in spite of calls by the Hurriyat Conference and social pressure on families to reject the money from Government of India.

== Conviction for killing ==
The army convicted seven soldiers, including two officers, and sentenced them to life imprisonment for a staged killing of three Kashmiri civilians and passing it off as an anti-militancy operation for rewards and remunerations in J&K in 2010. The court martial proceedings began in January 2014 and ended in September of that year. In April 2010, army had said it had killed three infiltrators in the Machil sector and claimed they were Pakistani militants. The men were later identified as Shahzad Ahmad Khan, Riyaz Ahmad Lone and Muhammad Shafi Lone, all residents of Baramulla district. They were lured to work as porters for the Army in Kupwara district. Instead, the Army killed them in a fake encounter, applied black paint on the clean-shaven faces of the slain, placed weapons on them and said they had killed foreign militants.

=== Suspension of sentences ===
On 27 July 2017, The Armed Forces Tribunal suspended the life sentence of the five army personnel including a Colonel and a Captain who had been convicted by a General Court Martial in 2014 for staging the killing of three Kashmiri civilians at Macchil in 2010 and branding them as foreign militants for brass medals and cash rewards.

== FIR against Chief Minister and police ==
In March 2015, All Parties Hurriyat Conference leader Syed Ali Shah Geelani entirely blamed then Chief Minister of Jammu and Kashmir Omar Abdullah and former Senior Superintendent of Police (SSP) Ashiq Bukhari for killings of 2010 unrest and filed a FIR in the court of Chief Judicial Magistrate (CJM), Srinagar.

"(We) have decided to register a criminal case against Omar Abdullah and Ashiq Bukhari for the innocent killings of 2010 and will try to bring the murderers of the innocent students to justice," a Hurriyat statement said.
