= Stephen Court fire =

Fire in 2011 at Park Street, Kolkata, India

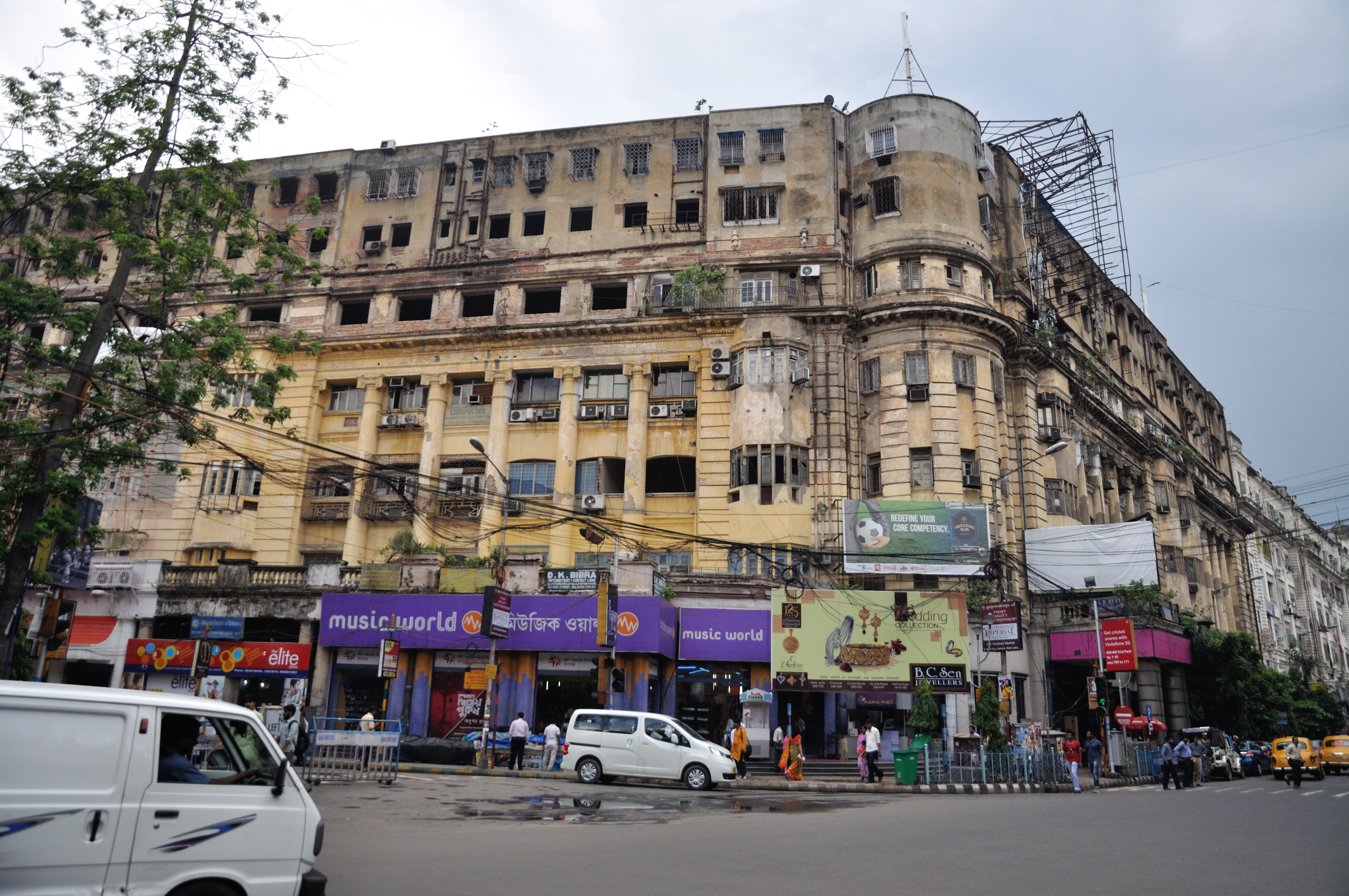
- In 2013
- Location: 18 A Park Street, Kolkata, West Bengal; 22.5524°N 88.3522°E
- Cause: Short circuit
- Deaths: 43
- Injuries: 20

The Stephen Court fire was a major fire in a historical building, Stephen Court, that occurred in March 2010 in Kolkata, West Bengal, India. The fire started by a short circuit in the lifts at 2:15 p.m. IST, rapidly engulfing the fifth and sixth floors. A delay in the start of rescue operations was experienced due to the inadequate planning and preparedness of the fire-service department. Many occupants of the building were forced onto narrow ledges on the sides of the building. 43 people died in the fire. More than 300 firemen and 40 fire tenders were involved in bringing the blaze under control. Later a charge-sheet was prepared by the police which held the directors and caretakers responsible for the mishap. A probe by the government into this incident revealed that illegal construction of two floors and the lack of adequate fire-fighting equipment were major factors that contributed to the blaze getting out of control. In 2016, the Stephen Court Welfare Association, an unregistered company, reconstructed the building.

== Building ==
Stephen Court is a seven-storey building located on plot 18 A in the upscale neighbourhood of Park Street, Kolkata. It is over 150 years old and is listed as a Grade-II heritage building.

=== Original construction ===
Arathoon Stephen (1861 – 14 May 1927) was a member of the Armenian community of Kolkata who spent huge amounts of money to help shape the economic growth of the city. He was also a shareholder and the first managing director of a company known as the Stephen Court Ltd. This company, apart from owning several other heritage structures in Kolkata, built a three-storey building on land leased by Peter Charles Earnest Paul and named it after himself. The building, Stephen Court, was used for both commercial and residential purposes as there were no laws differentiating them during those times.

=== Illegal construction ===
Around 1930, a fourth storey was added to the building without the necessary building permits, followed by two more in 1984. The civic authorities issued a notice of building code violation on the building's management authorities. In 1984, the illegally constructed floors were regularised by the payment of a penalty. A mezzanine floor was also constructed between the ground floor and first floor, the date of construction of which is not known.

=== Fire clearance ===
At the time of the construction and regularisation of the two illegal floors, the civic laws of Kolkata required a fire clearance for any structure above the height of 18 metres (59 ft). After the regularisation of the additional floors, the building did cross the 18-metre (59 ft) limit. Due to a loophole in the law, the authorities did not have to obtain fire clearance, as regularised buildings were exempted.

=== Overusage and maintenance ===
Stephen Court was put to both commercial and residential usage. This put an additional strain on the aged wiring of the building.

== Fire ==
At around 1:05 p.m. to 2:05 p.m. IST on 23 March 2010, a fire broke out at Stephen Court. Thought to be from a short circuit from a lift in between the fifth and sixth floors, the fire spread upwards and sideways, engulfing the whole building in flames. The flames were hastened by the lack of any modern fire-fighting measures in the building. Those who were trapped by the flames went out onto the narrow parapets and ledges, waiting to be rescued. One woman reportedly slipped and fell five floors below; she succumbed to her injuries. Around 2:15 the fire service department received a call for help.

=== Rescue operations ===
Nearly 300 firemen and 40 fire tenders were deployed to bring the fire under control. Two Bronto skylifts were deployed to rescue people stuck on the upper floors.

At first only two fire engines reached the spot from the nearby Free School Street fire station, but more were eventually requisitioned from more distant areas of the city such as Behala and Salt Lake. Meanwhile, people trapped inside the building attempted to escape using unstable ladders and ropes. Protesters gathered in front of the building demanding taller ladders to be used to rescue people trapped on the fifth and sixth floors. Two skylifts that had been stored in faraway parts of the city, were deployed after a certain delay due to traffic. Later, 10 more fire tenders also joined forces to tackle the blaze. The fire was eventually brought under control by 10:30 p.m. IST.

== Aftermath ==
The firemen cleared out the building by going from door to door and checking for survivors, the injured and the dead. 43 people died in the blaze. Around 20 people were injured. A First Information Report was filed against the caretaker of the building as he had refused to co-operate and help in the rescue operations. A charge sheet prepared by the police named the three directors of Stephen Court Ltd. and the two caretakers for the lack of maintenance of the building. The liftman, caretaker and assistant caretaker were immediately taken into custody, two of the directors surrendered and the third was subsequently arrested in Uttar Pradesh.

The government announced a probe of the incident. A forensic team confirmed that the blaze had been started by a short circuit. Further investigation revealed a lack of maintenance of the electrical circuitry leading to exposed live wires in the basement, which combined with the wooden main stairs made the building a tinderbox. This had aided the fire in getting out of control. As portions of the fifth and sixth floor had crumbled during the fire, the Kolkata Municipal Corporation on the advice of the forensic team, took the decision to demolish the top two storeys of the building but had to stop the operations after a section of the owners moved the high court. A few residents were allowed to use the building weeks after the fire but had to sign personal risk bonds, absolving the civic authorities of any liability in case of injury for a period of six months. Moreover, the supply of electricity and of water to the building were cut off by the KMC citing the precarious condition of the building. Major parts of the building, including the lifts, were out of bounds for those residents.

=== Reconstruction ===
In 2016, an unregistered association, the Stephen Court Welfare Association, took the initiative of restoring the heritage building. By pooling a fund from the owners of the flats, they repaired the broken pillars, replaced the staircases, and renovated the soot-covered exterior. Care was taken to bring the building up to date with modern fire fighting techniques and equipment.
