= Anjali Mendes =

Indian model (1946–2010)

Anjali Mendes (born Phyllis Mendes; 29 January 1946 – 17 June 2010) was an Indian fashion model from Mumbai who was based in France. She was attached to Pierre Cardin’s salon in Paris during the 1970s and 1980s. Other designers she modeled for included Emanuel Ungaro, Elsa Schiaparelli and Givenchy. After retirement, she managed Cardin’s Indian operations for 18 years. In 2004, she published a cookbook titled "Cuisine Indienne De Mere En Fille". She died on 17 June 2010, after suddenly falling ill at her home in Provence, France.
