= Kalarooch =

Kalaroos Lolab kalaroos Lolab
- pass
- Location in Lolab valley Jammu and Kashmir, India Kalaroos Lolab (India)
- Coordinates: 34.49°N 74.25°E
- Country: India
- Union Territory: Jammu & Kashmir
- District: Kupwara

Population (2011)
  - Total: 37,233

Languages
  - Official: Kashmiri, Urdu, Hindi, Dogri, English
- Time zone: UTC+5:30 (IST)
- PIN: 193222

Kalaroos, is a pass of lolab valley of Kupwara district in the union territory of Jammu and Kashmir, India. It is surrounded by mountains which increases its beauty. The village is located 11 km (6.8 mi) from district headquarters Kupwara.

== Demographics ==
According to the 2011 census of India, Kalarooch has 5007 households. Total population of Kalrooch according to 2011 census is 37,233. The literacy rate of Kalarooch was 36.51%. In Kalarooch, Male literacy stands at 44.73% while the female literacy rate was 26.60%.

Demographics (2011 Census)
	Total	Male	Female
Population	37233	20338	16895
Children aged below 6 years	9354	5104	4250
Scheduled caste	53	53	0
Scheduled tribe	12038	6219	5819
Literacy	48.76%	59.72%	35.55%
Workers (all)	10030	8304	1726
Main workers (total)	3502	–	–
Marginal workers (total)	6528	5223	1305

== Transport ==
=== Rail ===
The nearest railway stations to Baramulla are Sopore railway station and Baramulla railway station both located at a distance of 42 kilometres respectively.

=== Air ===
The nearest airport is Srinagar International Airport located at a distance of 95 kilometres and is a 2.5-hour drive.

== See also ==
- Lolab Valley
- Kupwara
- Drugmulla
