= Diwakar Vaish =

Indian robotics researcher

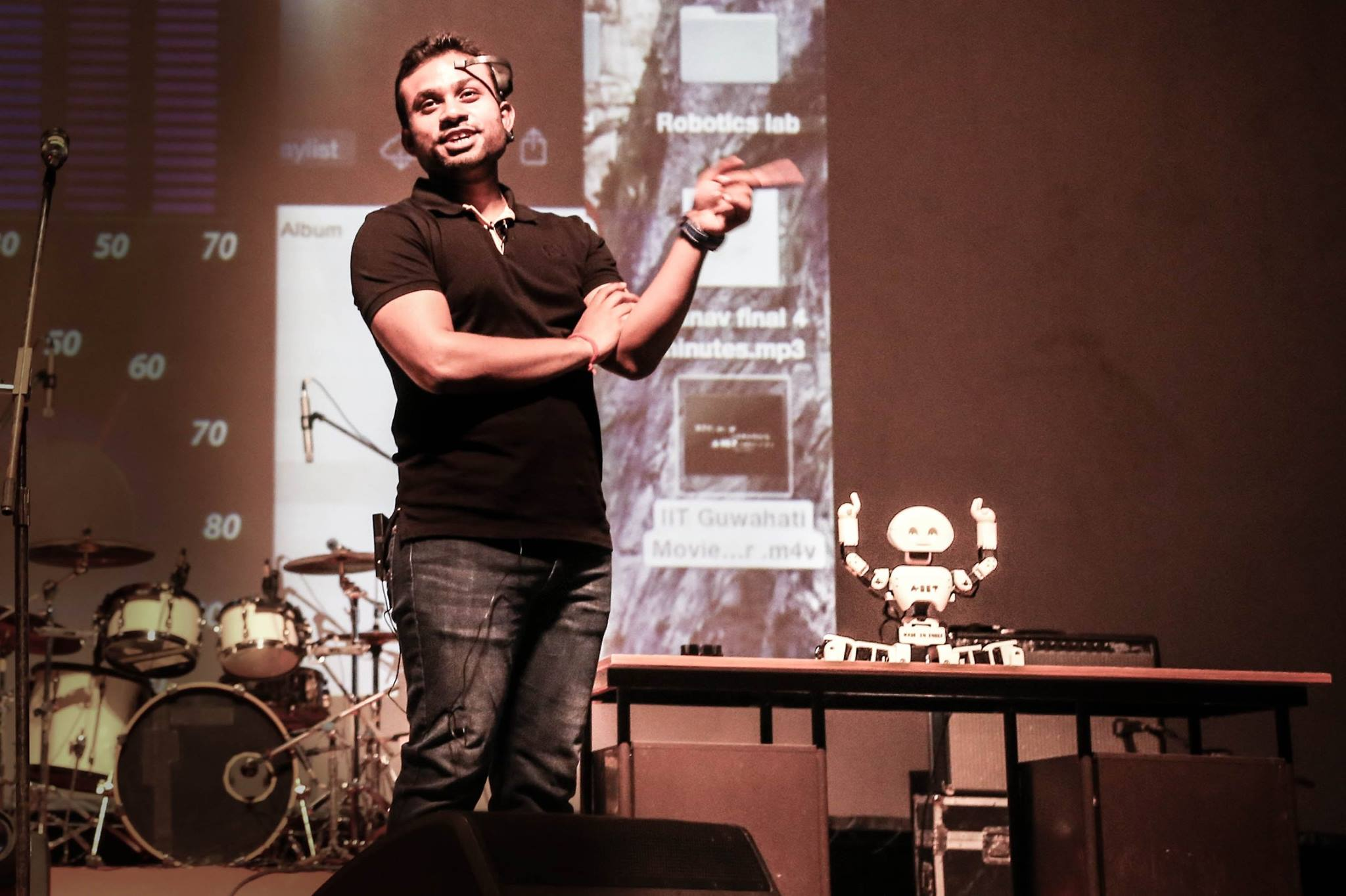
- Prof. Diwakar Vaish at IIT-Guwahati Techfest- Techniche 2015
- Born: 23 July 1992 (age 34); Delhi
- Occupation: Roboticist
- Years active: 2010 - present
- Known for: Developing 'Manav (robot)' Researching on mind controlled robots. Creator of the world's first production brain controlled wheelchair
- Spouse: Sakshi Dhall (m. 2020)

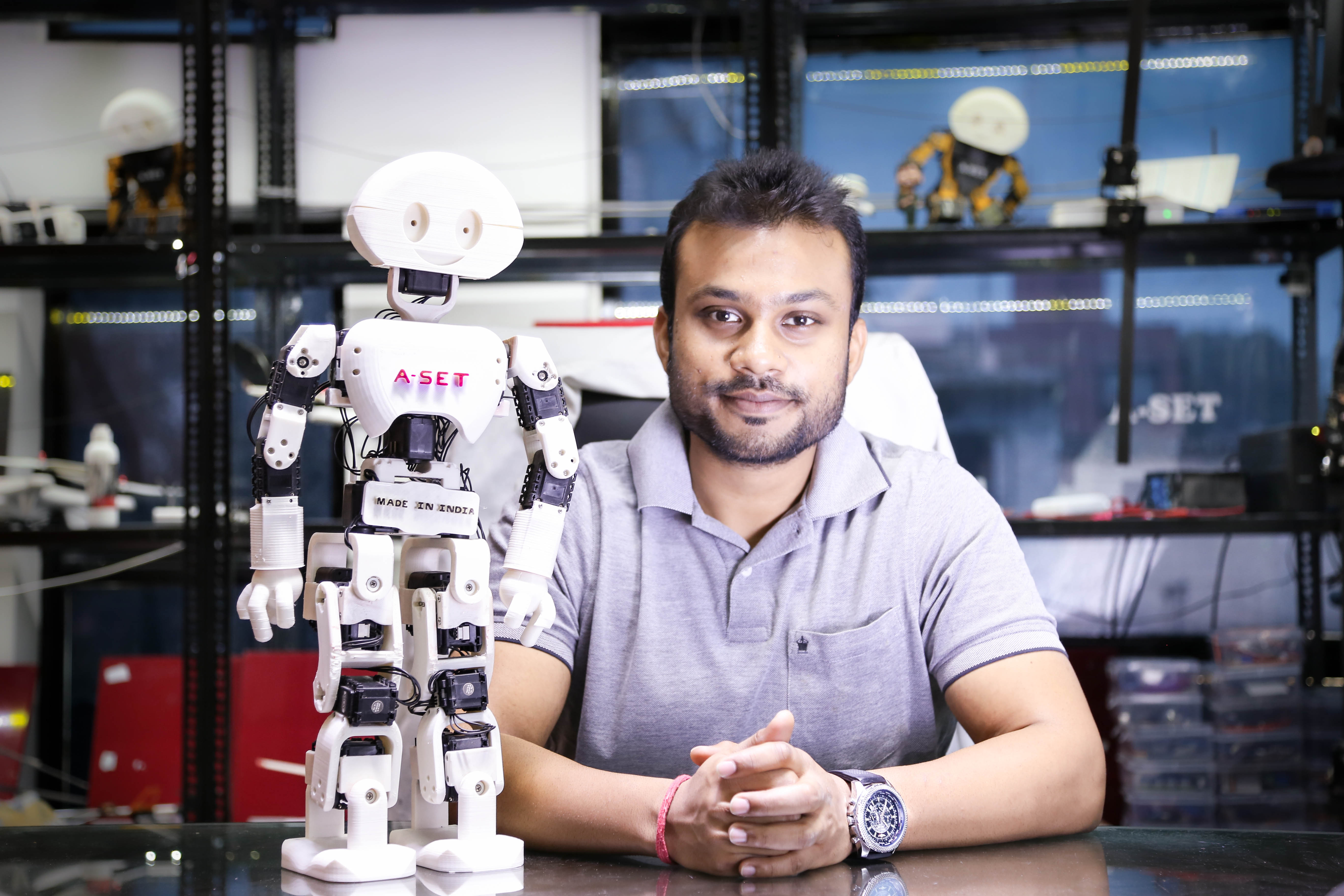
Manav is India's first 3D printed humanoid robot, It was developed in late 2014 to early 2015. The robot is made on a multi processor platform to enhance research work.

Diwakar Vaish (/dɪˈvækər ˈvæʃ/ div-AK-ər VASH; born 23 July 1992) is an Indian-born robotics researcher and Head of Robotics and Research at A-SET Training and Research Institutes (2010–present). He is the developer of India's first completely indigenous 3D printed humanoid robot (Manav), India's first mind controlled robot, and the world's first production brain controlled wheelchair. Diwakar collaborated with the All India Institute of Medical Sciences to create the AgVa Ventilator, a compact and inexpensive medical ventilator. He founded AgVa Healthcare (now D&D Healthcare) to make and distribute the product. The company was the subject of controversy in 2020 due to claims that many of its ventilators were defective and that some were adjusted to report delivering higher levels of oxygen than were actually being delivered.

== Achievements ==
- He is the developer of Manav, India's first completely indigenous 3D printed humanoid robot.
- In 2017, Vaish co-created the world's cheapest and smallest ventilator, alongside the All India Institute of Medical Sciences. The ventilator does not require an artificial oxygen supply and can process atmospheric air. The ventilator, currently in trials, will cost $250 US Dollars.
- In 2016, he developed the world's first production brain-controlled wheelchair, which uses the brain's electrical impulses to command the wheelchair. It has been developed for patients of locked-in syndrome (LIS).
- He developed an unmanned ground vehicle named "Versatile" which has the capability to change its shape according to the terrain.

== Controversy ==
Vaish was in the news in 2020 over accusations that his company, AgVa Healthcare, provided ventilators during the COVID-19 pandemic that could not deliver required levels of oxygen, even though the software reported that the correct level was being delivered. Vaish had a public dispute with Indian politician Rahul Gandhi over these claims. Vaish claimed that the criticism of his company was a result of upsetting a foreign cartel that provides ventilators to India.

== See also ==
- Brain–computer interface
