= Shikaripura Harihareshwara =

Indian writer

Shikaripura Harihareshwara (1936 – 23 July 2010) was a Kannada writer. He served as the chief editor of Amerikannada, a bimonthly magazine in Kannada. In 1999, he was among the recipients of the Rajyothsava award constituted by Government of Karnataka. He was widely known for the literary work he did residing in United States of America.

== Works ==
- 'Darshana'
- Hariharēśvara, Es. Ke. Kannaḍa Uḷisi Beḷasuva Bage: "Amerikannaḍa"da Cintanegaḷu. Maisūru: Saṃvahana, 2005. Print. 'US Library of Congress permalink'
