= 2010 in rail transport in India =

== Events ==
=== January – February ===
- January 2 – The first of three accidents in Uttar Pradesh on this day takes place near the town of Etawah, about 170 miles (270 kilometers) southwest of Lucknow, the capital of Uttar Pradesh state, when the Lichchavi Express entering the station in heavy fog runs into the stationary Magadh Express train stopped there. Ten people, including the driver of one of the trains, are injured. At least 10 people were reported to have been killed.
- January 2 – The Gorakhdham Express and Prayagraj Express collide near the Panki railway station in Kanpur, about 100 kilometres (62 mi) southwest of Lucknow. The crash left five people dead and about 40 others injured.
- January 2 – At Pratapgarh, 61 kilometres (38 mi) from Allahabad, the Sarayu Express breaks into a tractor trolley at an unstaffed railway crossing. Though nobody is injured, the engine of the train is severely damaged.
- January 2 – All seven coaches of the Arunachal Pradesh Express, running between Murkongselek and Rangiya derail between Helem and Nij Bogaon in Assam, India in the early hours of the day. No passengers are hurt.
- January 16 – Three people die and around a dozen are injured when two express trains collide in thick fog near Tundla, 25 kilometres (16 mi) from Agra, in India's northern state of Uttar Pradesh. The driver of one of the trains apparently did not react to a signal, slamming his train into another on the same track.
- January 17 – The Lucknow-Sultanpur Harihar Nath Express strikes a car at an unstaffed railway crossing under Haidergarh police station area on Sunday afternoon in Barabanki district, India. Two persons traveling in the car die on the spot and four others who sustained serious injuries were referred to Trauma Centre in Lucknow. Train traffic on this route is disrupted for nearly two hours after the accident. This was the fifth accident in a series of similar accidents in the area.
- January 22 – Three bogies of a goods train derail at Sathiyaon station near Azamgarh, in Uttar Pradesh, disrupting rail traffic in the region. No one is injured. Traffic is disrupted on the busy Varanasi–Azamgarh–Gorakhpur route.

=== March – August ===
- March 20 – Maharajas’ Express luxury train begins operation in India as a joint venture between Indian Railway Catering and Tourism Corporation and the travel agency Cox and Kings India Ltd.
- May 28 – At least 148 people were killed and more than 200 got injured after the Mumbai bound Gyaneshwari Express, from Howrah Station, with 13 passenger coaches, was derailed by an explosion on the tracks and collided with another train as it traveled through the Paschim Medinipur district in West Bengal. The Naxalite-Maoist Group, which is suspected to have derailed the train which threw five of its carriages into the path of an oncoming goods train, however, deny the allegation.
- June 6 – Passengers of the Hazrat Nizamuddin-Visakhapatnam Samata Express had a narrow escape when its engine derailed near Arand railway station in Chhattisgarh, but no one was injured. Rail services through the track were affected for about five hours due to the derailment at an area between Arand and Bhimkhoj stations in Raipur section. The cause of derailment is yet to be ascertained, officials said.
- July 20 – The government of Andhra Pradesh announces that among the eight companies that submitted proposals, Larsen & Toubro is the preferred bidder for construction of the Hyderabad Metro in India, costing a proposed Rs122 billion. The state and federal governments will each finance 20% of the project while Larsen & Toubro will finance the remaining 60%. The project is expected to be completed in 2014. (Railway Gazette)
