= Nadihal =

- Village
- Location in Jammu and Kashmir, India Nadihal (India)
- Coordinates: 34.39°N 74.66°E
- Country: India
- Union Territory: Jammu and Kashmir
- District: Bandipora

Population (2011)
  - Total: 5,167

Languages
  - Official: Kashmiri, Urdu, Hindi, Dogri, English
- Time zone: UTC+5:30 (IST)
- PIN: 193502

Nadihal is a village located in the north of the Indian union territory of Jammu and Kashmir. It is just 4 km away from Bandipora town, and 51 km away from Srinagar. It is the largest village in Bandipora district. There are many small villages around it. It has a population of 5,167 (as per 2011 census). Nadihal is inhabited by only Muslims. In this village, there are two government middle schools, one higher secondary school, and two high schools.

The main occupations of the people include agriculture, trade and services.

In Nadihal, there are 8 mosques, a Jamia mosque and an Eid Gah. The main Jamia Masjid, called "Markazi Jamia Masjid Nadihal", is run by the local Auqaf committee and is located near the main bus stop. It is extensively decorated and has almost four storeys.

Nadihal market consists of almost 250 shops selling groceries, vegetables, fruits, medicine, timber, steel and iron.
