= Death of Baby Falak =

2012 child abuse case in New Delhi, India

Falak was a two-year-old victim of human trafficking who was admitted to AIIMS Trauma Centre in New Delhi, India, on 18 January 2012, with a fractured skull, broken bones, and human bite marks on her body all over her body and cheeks that had been branded by a hot iron. She was named Falak, by the nurses at the ICU.

Falak had survived six brain surgeries, contracted severe infections in the lung, blood and brain due to which she was under ventilation and had a shunt to drain accumulated fluid, and suffered three heart attacks, succumbing to the last on 15 March 2012, 56 days since hospitalization. The doctors and nurses treating the baby said that it was an exceptional case and that it left an intense experience.

The baby was brought to the hospital by a 15-year-old girl, who initially claimed to be the mother and that the baby fell out of the bed, but upon interrogation admitted to hitting the child after a tantrum and obtaining the baby through her partner, Rajkumar who had subjected her to forced prostitution after helping her elope to escape her abusive father. She is set be tried for culpable homicide not amounting to murder. Falak was discovered to have been separated from two siblings, her brother who was traced to West Delhi's Uttam Nagar locality, and her sister who was traced to Muzaffarpur in Bihar married to a Rajasthani man. Her biological mother was identified as Munni, a 22 year old trafficking victim who had been sold into a second marriage by two women traffickers who assured her they would take proper care of her children. Ten people were arrested in the case including the two women traffickers and also Mohammad Dilshad alias Rajkumar, who had abandoned the baby with his girlfriend.

Baby Falak was buried at Ferozeshah Kotla burial grounds by her biological mother on 16 March 2012, after Child Welfare Committee's directions. Her biological mother was subsequently housed in a shelter through the Social Welfare Department.

== See also ==
- Child abuse
- Human trafficking
- Violence against women
