= Rahi, Raebareli =

Rahi Rāhi
- Village
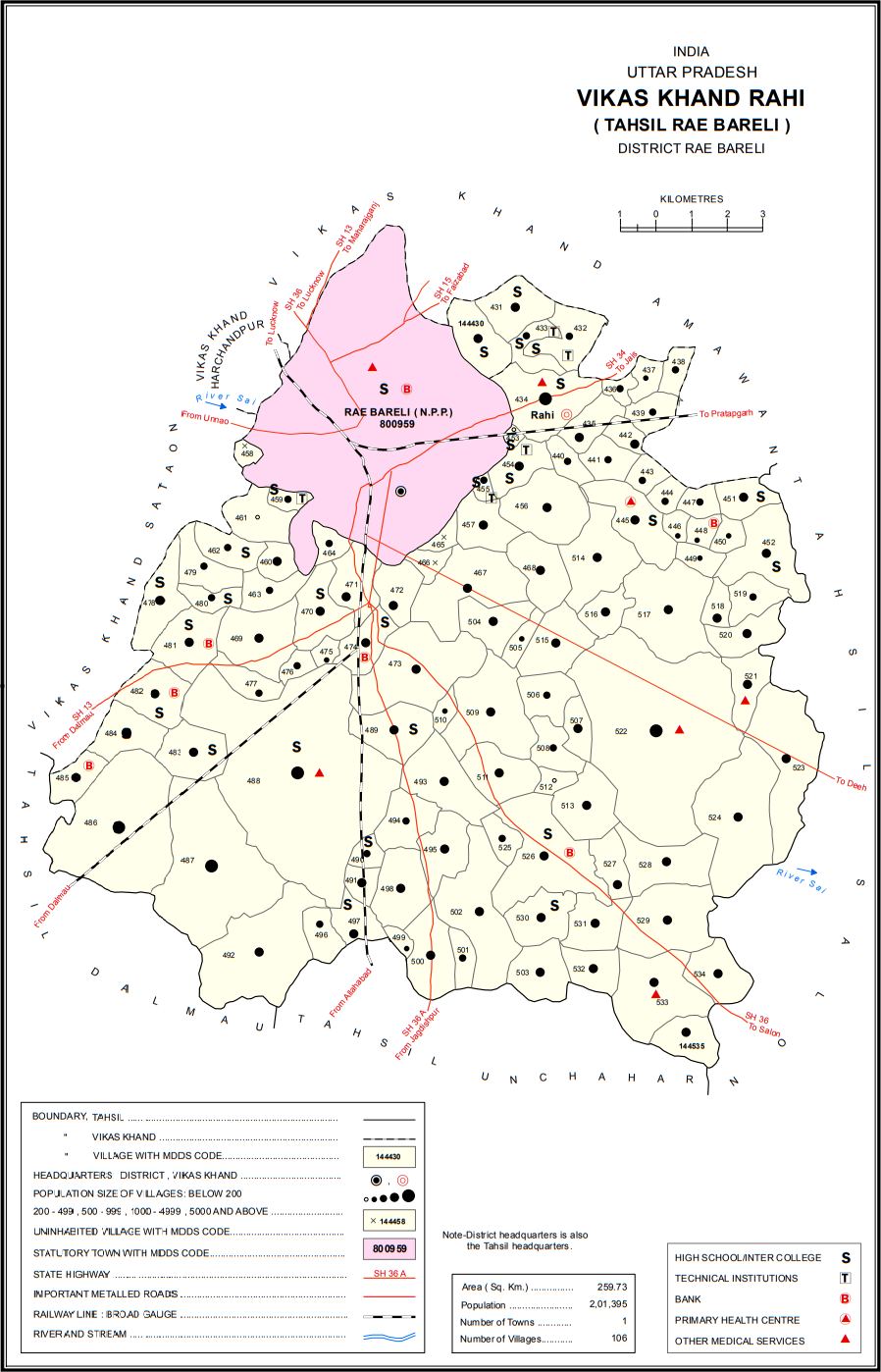
- Map of Rahi CD block

- Location in Uttar Pradesh, India
- Coordinates: 26.238867°N 81.30313°E
- Country India: India
- State: Uttar Pradesh
- District: Raebareli

Area
  - Total: 6.89 km^{2} (2.66 sq mi)

Population (2011)
  - Total: 7,536
  - Density: 1,090/km^{2} (2,830/sq mi)

Languages
  - Official: Hindi
- Time zone: UTC+5:30 (IST)
- Vehicle registration: UP-35

Rahi is a village and corresponding community development block in Rae Bareli district, Uttar Pradesh, India. It is located 7 km from Rae Bareli, the district headquarters, which according to one folk etymology is named after the village. Rahi was formerly the seat of a pargana before Rae Bareli replaced it in that capacity. As of 2011, Rahi has a population of 7,536 people, in 1,373 households. It has one primary school and one medical clinic.

== History ==
Historically, the village of Rahi was under the jurisdiction of the Hardaspur Talukdari, estate during the period when the Hardaspur Estate held administrative and territorial authority in the region. At that time, the estate was ruled by Raja Ganga Prasad Srivastava and Rani Jugraj Kunwari, who were the prominent rulers of the Hardaspur Raj. Under their governance, several surrounding villages, including Rahi, formed part of the estate’s territorial domain and were administered through the Talukdari system, which was a common feudal landholding structure during that era. The authority of the Hardaspur rulers extended over these villages, and local administration, land revenue collection, and regional governance were managed under their rule.

The 1961 census recorded Rahi as comprising 10 hamlets, with a total population of 2,950 people (1,664 male and 1,286 female), in 617 households and 576 physical houses. The area of the village was given as 1,708 acres and it had a post office at that point. It had one grain mill and 3 makers of jewellery and/or precious metal items.

The 1981 census recorded Rahi as having a population of 4,611 people, in 951 households, and having an area of 363.30 hectares. The main staple foods were given as wheat and rice.

== Archaeology ==
During an archaeological survey of Raebareli district in the late 1990s, archaeologists D. P. Tewari and Anoop Kumar Singh found some redware and brickbats at Rahi, which they dated tentatively to the Kushan to medieval period.

== Villages ==
Rahi CD block has the following 106 villages:

Village name	Total land area (hectares)	Population (in 2011)
Umara	251.5	1,916
Kasehti	232.5	1,400
Sikandarpur	94.8	608
Rahi (block headquarters)	689	7,536
Prem Rajpur	121.3	1,374
Chak Pachkhara	66.1	628
Kasimpur Baghail	105.6	410
Rampur Baghail	88.6	670
Dohri	100.8	731
Pure Siddha	91.7	528
Govindpur	123.5	864
Radhanpur	72.2	1,124
Painte Mau	63.7	617
Kalanderpur	73.4	712
Rustampur	323.6	4,546
Manpur Saharwa	43.6	394
Bani	86.2	672
Chak Lodipur	69.2	449
Tamberpur	63.2	407
Alauddeenpur	39.5	274
Bakwara	196.7	1,540
Ratansipur	393.7	3,122
Barwaripur	71.3	154
Salempur Siki	196	1,647
Bhatpurwa	79.2	787
Bandra Mau	271.8	3,101
Jagdishpur	217	1,727
Chak Bhadurpur	156.5	0
Chak Shahabuddeenpur	23.9	879
Akbarpur Kachhwah	219.3	4,261
Chak Baholiyapur	21.1	14
Ibrahimpur	219.3	952
Kolwa Khurd	73.3	923
Bibipur Mutfarrikat	89	949
Godwa Gadiyani	64.2	0
Mahanandpur	28.7	0
Behta Khurd	478.2	2,654
Bhoye Mau	221.7	1,318
Sulakhiyapur	321.5	2,423
Madhupuri	215.1	2,445
Garhi Mutwalli	197.7	1,634
Jahanpur Kodar	215.6	1,525
Jhakrasi	481.8	3,828
Dariyapur	122.4	1,940
Sultanpur Aaima	58.6	448
Pasapur	56.3	550
Khnuwa	134.8	863
Vinohra	305.3	2,256
Fakharul Hasan Khera	116.6	731
Machhechhar	70.3	519
Saidanpur	277.9	1,854
Khagipur Sadwa	223.4	2,020
Suraj Kunda	273.6	2,196
Rajapur	214.4	1,245
Zafarapur	121	1,474
Bela Khara	887.5	5,928
Bela Gusisi	1,068.5	7,320
Bela Bhela	2,118.9	16,623
Mohammadpur Kuchariya	383	3,249
Paliya	94.4	765
Udrehari	93.6	1,045
Bela Tekai	661	4,634
Sarai Damu	470.9	3,948
Chak Nizam	184.9	806
Bhaon	385	4,161
Chak Vallihar	96	566
Ikauna	110	1,101
Jamalpur Nankari	156.9	1,203
Chak Mansahari	21	205
Sarai Muhammad Sharif	175.5	1,313
Ekchhaniya	57.6	535
Kachaunda Muhiuddinpur	572.5	4,034
Paraura	174.8	1,060
Raghunathpur	157.2	1,217
Bhaironpur Kataili	85.7	373
Eksana	187.6	847
Korchanda Mau	129	1,022
Bhakhwara	161.2	876
Bhadokhar	533.6	3,312
Purushottampur Karor	47.1	415
Raipur Maheri	224.3	1,753
Chak Bhadokhar	33.5	115
Kola Haibatpur	178.4	1,826
Mulihamau	354.2	2,094
Jaraulla	245	1,311
Ayaspur Dihi	114.4	1,635
Godwara	506.9	3,824
Monai	108.2	1,014
Nathuwapur	106.5	907
Chak Rar	148.4	1,005
Mohgawan	266.5	1,892
Lodhwari	1,517.6	10,592
Anti Naugawan	524.2	2,668
Khurhati	668.4	4,727
Chak Kirihra	103.9	686
Kamauli	340	3,147
Anuruddhapur	91.9	1,528
Tala Gopalpur	344.5	1,902
Basarh	408.8	2,732
Semra	194.3	1,408
Prmanpur	169	1,365
Jariyari	191.2	1,688
Sanhi	503.4	3,645
Bhaidpur	187	1,473
Balepur	149	1,266
