= Sikandarpur, Rahi =

Sikandarpur
- Village
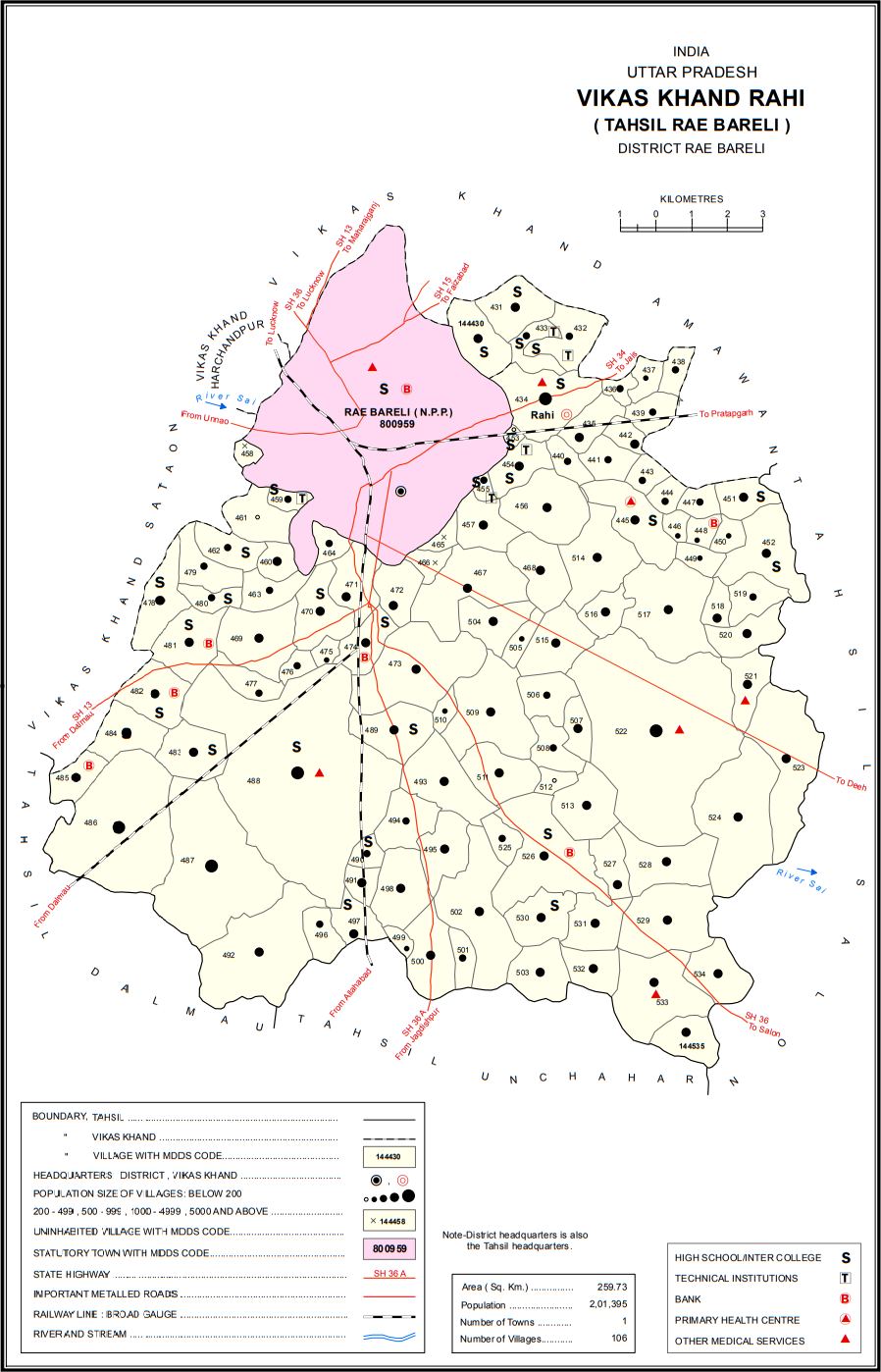
- Map showing Sikandarpur (#433) in Rahi CD block

- Location in Uttar Pradesh, India
- Coordinates: 26.2475°N 81.2938°E
- Country: India
- State: Uttar Pradesh
- District: Raebareli

Area
  - Total: 0.948 km^{2} (0.366 sq mi)

Population (2011)
  - Total: 608
  - Density: 641/km^{2} (1,660/sq mi)

Languages
  - Official: Hindi
- Time zone: UTC+5:30 (IST)
- Vehicle registration: UP-35

Sikandarpur is a village in Rahi block of Rae Bareli district, Uttar Pradesh, India. As of 2011, it has a population of 608 people, in 119 households. It has one primary school and no healthcare facilities.

The 1961 census recorded Sikandarpur (as "Sikandrapur") as comprising 2 hamlets, with a total population of 160 people (92 male and 68 female), in 32 households and 30 physical houses. The area of the village was given as 243 acres.

The 1981 census recorded Sikandarpur as having a population of 280 people, in 58 households, and having an area of 259.01 hectares. The main staple foods were given as wheat and rice.
