= Rampur Baghel =

Rampur Baghel Rāmpur Baghel
- Village
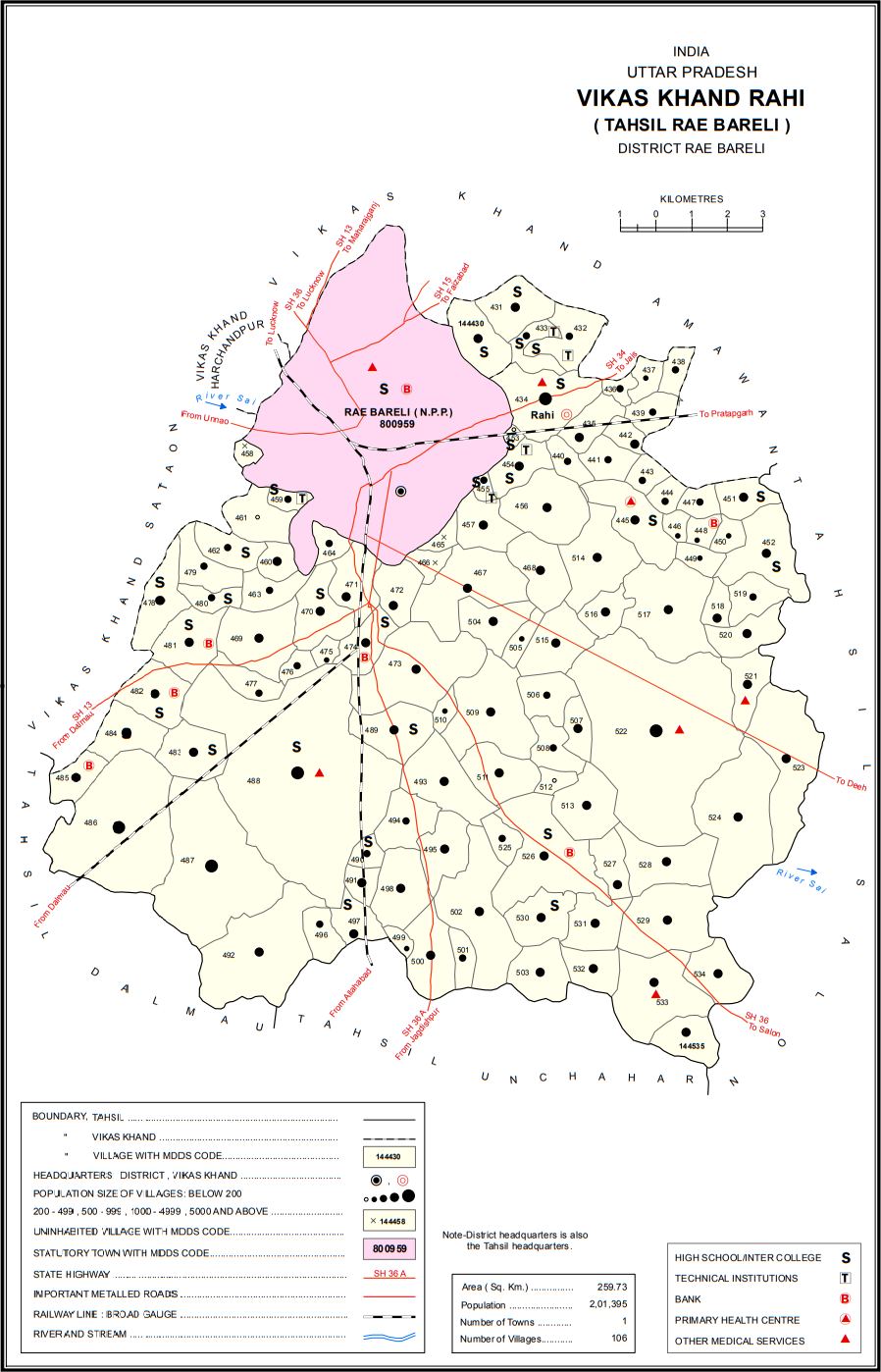
- Map showing Rampur Baghel (#438) in Rahi CD block

- Location in Uttar Pradesh, India
- Coordinates: 26.248278°N 81.334759°E
- Country India: India
- State: Uttar Pradesh
- District: Raebareli

Area
  - Total: 0.886 km^{2} (0.342 sq mi)

Population (2011)
  - Total: 670
  - Density: 760/km^{2} (2,000/sq mi)

Languages
  - Official: Hindi
- Time zone: UTC+5:30 (IST)
- Vehicle registration: UP-35

Rampur Baghel is a village in Rahi block of Rae Bareli district, Uttar Pradesh, India. It is located 11 km from Rae Bareli, the district headquarters. As of 2011, it has a population of 670 people, in 106 households. It has one primary school and no healthcare facilities.

The 1961 census recorded Rampur Baghel as comprising 3 hamlets, with a total population of 213 people (109 male and 104 female), in 38 households and 36 physical houses. The area of the village was given as 212 acres.

The 1981 census recorded Rampur Baghel as having a population of 331 people, in 65 households, and having an area of 88.22 hectares. The main staple foods were given as wheat and rice.
