= Bandramau =

Bandramau Bandrāmau
- Village
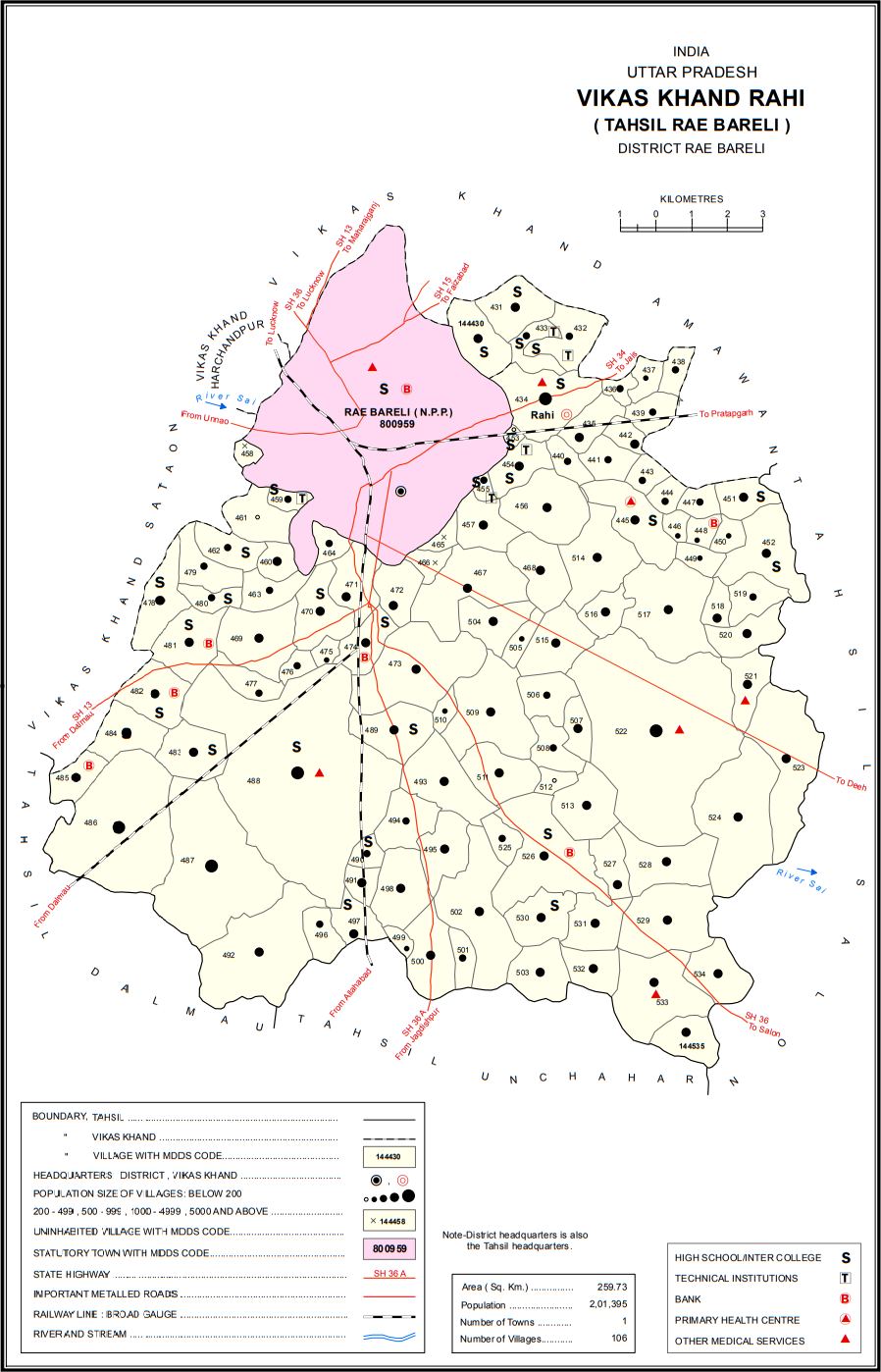
- Map showing Bandramau (#456) in Rahi CD block

- Location in Uttar Pradesh, India
- Coordinates: 26.213092°N 81.301411°E
- Country India: India
- State: Uttar Pradesh
- District: Raebareli

Area
  - Total: 2.718 km^{2} (1.049 sq mi)

Population (2011)
  - Total: 3,101
  - Density: 1,141/km^{2} (2,955/sq mi)

Languages
  - Official: Hindi
- Time zone: UTC+5:30 (IST)
- Vehicle registration: UP-35

Bandramau is a village in Rahi block of Rae Bareli district, Uttar Pradesh, India. It is located 8 km from Rae Bareli, the district headquarters. As of 2011, it has a population of 3,101 people, in 543 households. It has one primary school and no healthcare facilities.

The 1961 census recorded Bandramau as comprising 4 hamlets, with a total population of 1,166 people (603 male and 563 female), in 233 households and 202 physical houses. The area of the village was given as 682 acres.

The 1981 census recorded Bandramau (as "Bandaramau") as having a population of 1,643 people, in 306 households, and having an area of 273.17 hectares. The main staple foods were given as wheat and rice.
