= Kola Haibatpur =

- Village
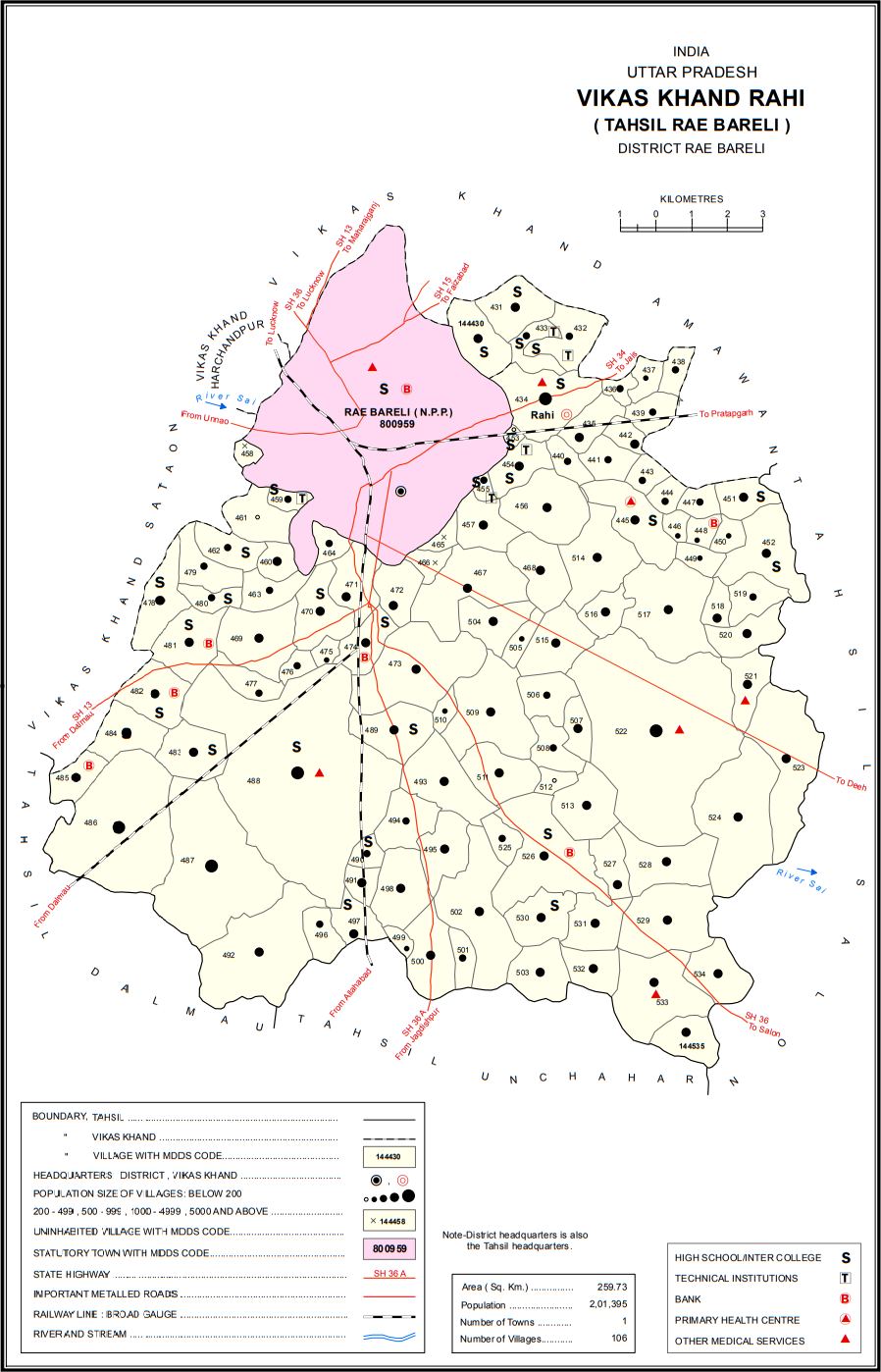
- Map showing Kola Haibatpur (#513) in Rahi CD block

- Location in Uttar Pradesh, India
- Coordinates: 26.139877°N 81.312183°E
- Country India: India
- State: Uttar Pradesh
- District: Raebareli

Area
  - Total: 1.784 km^{2} (0.689 sq mi)

Population (2011)
  - Total: 1,826
  - Density: 1,024/km^{2} (2,651/sq mi)

Languages
  - Official: Hindi
- Time zone: UTC+5:30 (IST)
- Vehicle registration: UP-35

Kola Haibatpur is a village in Rahi block of Rae Bareli district, Uttar Pradesh, India. It is located 12 km from Rae Bareli, the district headquarters. As of 2011, it has a population of 1,826 people, in 346 households. It has one primary school and no healthcare facilities.

The 1961 census recorded Kola Haibatpur as comprising 4 hamlets, with a total population of 634 people (320 male and 314 female), in 132 households and 128 physical houses. The area of the village was given as 766 acres.

The 1981 census recorded Kola Haibatpur as having a population of 1,006 people, in 195 households. The main staple foods were given as wheat and rice.
