= Jamalpur Nankari =

Jamalpur Nankari Jamālpur Nankāri
- Village
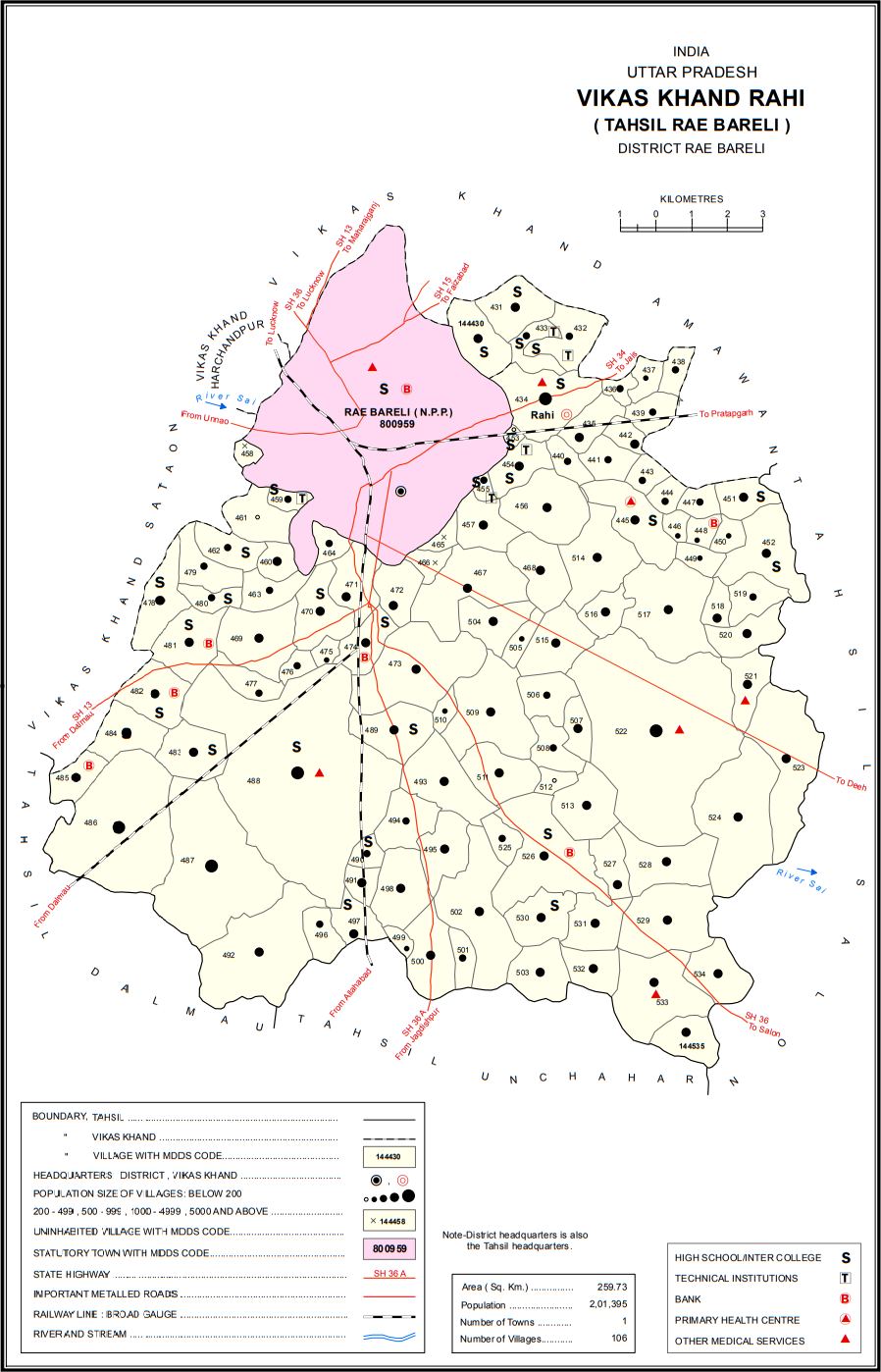
- Map showing Jamalpur Nankari (#498) in Rahi CD block

- Location in Uttar Pradesh, India
- Coordinates: 26.110979°N 81.257039°E
- Country India: India
- State: Uttar Pradesh
- District: Raebareli

Area
  - Total: 1.569 km^{2} (0.606 sq mi)

Population (2011)
  - Total: 1,203
  - Density: 766.7/km^{2} (1,986/sq mi)

Languages
  - Official: Hindi
- Time zone: UTC+5:30 (IST)
- Vehicle registration: UP-35

Jamalpur Nankari is a village in Rahi block of Rae Bareli district, Uttar Pradesh, India. It is located 4 km from Rae Bareli, the district headquarters. As of 2011, it has a population of 1,203 people, in 242 households. It has one primary school and no healthcare facilities.

The 1961 census recorded Jamalpur Nankari as comprising 5 hamlets, with a total population of 489 people (253 male and 236 female), in 95 households and 92 physical houses. The area of the village was given as 386 acres.

The 1981 census recorded Jamalpur Nankari as having a population of 702 people, in 144 households, and having an area of 156.21 hectares. The main staple foods were given as wheat and rice.
