= Bhakarwara =

Bhakarwara Bhakarwāra
- Village
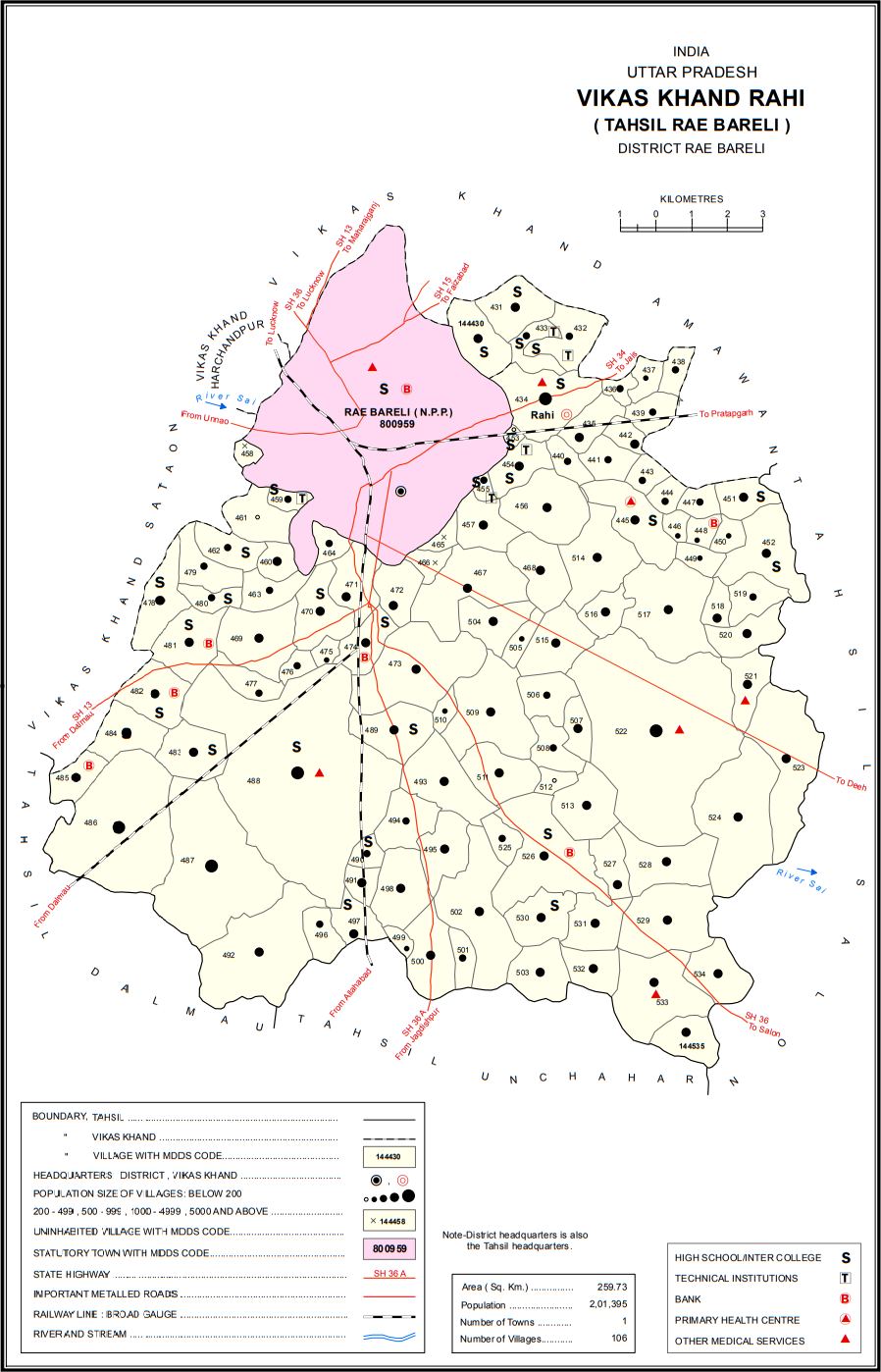
- Map showing Bhakarwara (#508) in Rahi CD block

- Location in Uttar Pradesh, India
- Coordinates: 26.151839°N 81.298987°E
- Country: India
- State: Uttar Pradesh
- District: Raebareli

Area
  - Total: 1.612 km^{2} (0.622 sq mi)

Population (2011)
  - Total: 876
  - Density: 543/km^{2} (1,410/sq mi)

Languages
  - Official: Hindi
- Time zone: UTC+5:30 (IST)
- Vehicle registration: UP-35

Bhakarwara is a village in Rahi block of Rae Bareli district, Uttar Pradesh, India. It is located 12 km from Rae Bareli, the district headquarters. As of 2011, it has a population of 876 people, in 168 households. It has no schools, medical facilities nor hosts a weekly haat or a permanent market. The village belongs to the nyaya panchayat of Bhadokhar.

The 1951 census recorded Bhakarwara as comprising 3 hamlets, with a total population of 286 people (144 male and 142 female), in 61 households and 59 physical houses. The area of the village was given as 410 acres. 14 residents were literate, all male. The village was listed as belonging to the pargana of Rae Bareli South and the thana of Kotwali.

The 1961 census recorded Bhakarwara as comprising 3 hamlets, with a total population of 292 people (160 male and 132 female), in 60 households and 57 physical houses. The area of the village was given as 410 acres.

The 1981 census recorded Bhakarwara (as "Bhakharwara") as having a population of 462 people, in 107 households, and having an area of 161.07 hectares. The main staple foods were listed as wheat and rice.

The 1991 census recorded Bhakarwara (as "Bhartarwara") as having a total population of 612 people (305 male and 307 female), in 110 households and 110 physical houses. The area of the village was listed as 159 hectares. Members of the 0-6 age group numbered 122, or 20% of the total; this group was 52% male (63) and 48% female (59). Members of scheduled castes numbered 82, or 13% of the village's total population, while no members of scheduled tribes were recorded. The literacy rate of the village was 31% (143 men and 49 women). 168 people were classified as main workers (163 men and 5 women), while 1 person was classified as a marginal worker (a woman); the remaining 443 residents were non-workers. The breakdown of main workers by employment category was as follows: 120 cultivators (i.e. people who owned or leased their own land); 30 agricultural labourers (i.e. people who worked someone else's land in return for payment); 0 workers in livestock, forestry, fishing, hunting, plantations, orchards, etc.; 0 in mining and quarrying; 3 household industry workers; 3 workers employed in other manufacturing, processing, service, and repair roles; 1 construction worker; 0 employed in trade and commerce; 1 employed in transport, storage, and communications; and 10 in other services.
