= Fakhrul Hasan Khera =

- Village
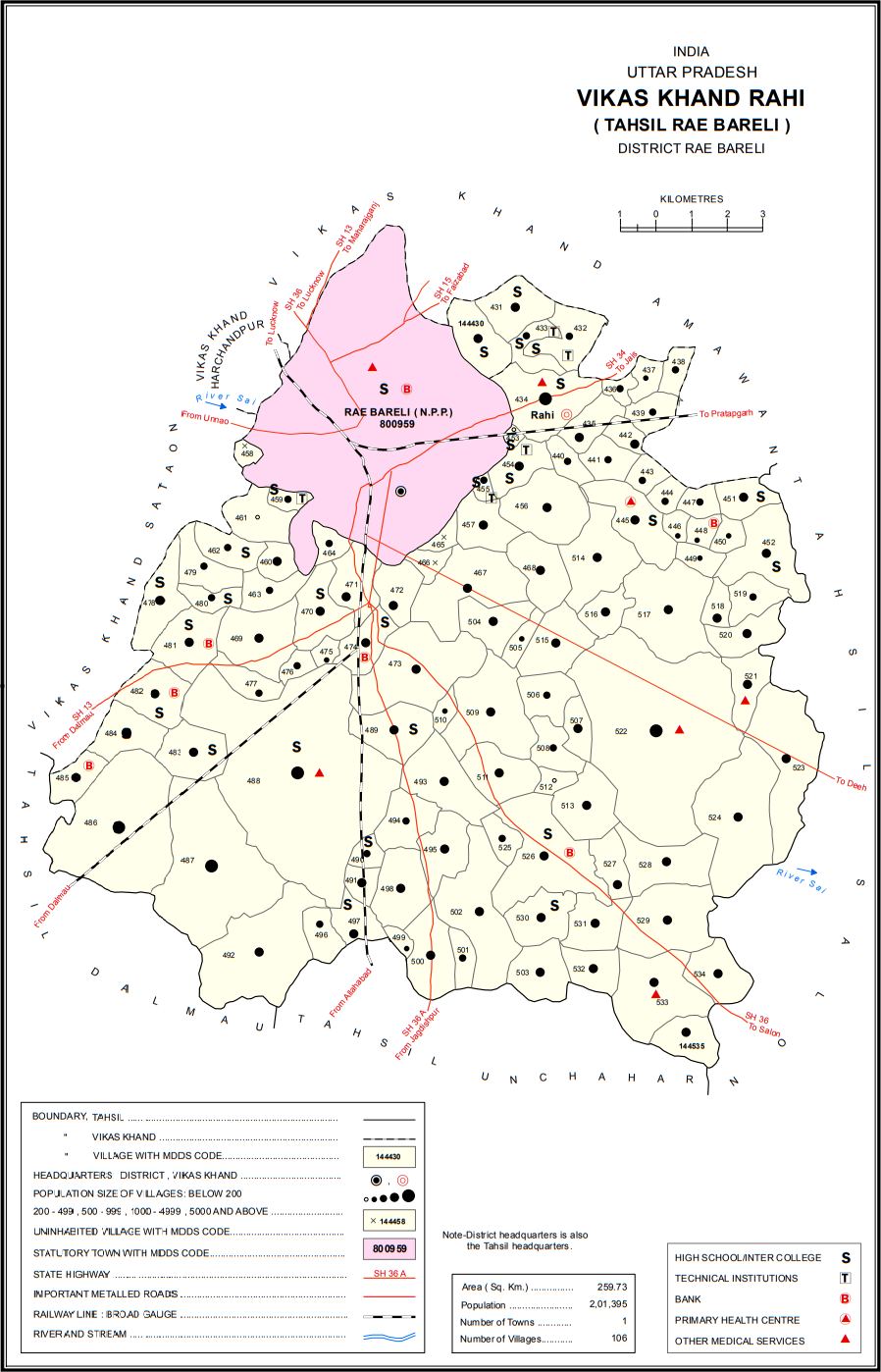
- Map showing Fakhrul Hasan Khera (#479) in Rahi CD block

- Location in Uttar Pradesh, India
- Coordinates: 26.193626°N 81.208226°E
- Country India: India
- State: Uttar Pradesh
- District: Raebareli

Area
  - Total: 1.166 km^{2} (0.450 sq mi)

Population (2011)
  - Total: 731
  - Density: 627/km^{2} (1,620/sq mi)

Languages
  - Official: Hindi
- Time zone: UTC+5:30 (IST)
- Vehicle registration: UP-35

Fakhrul Hasan Khera is a village in Rahi block of Rae Bareli district, Uttar Pradesh, India. It is located 8 km from Rae Bareli, the district headquarters. As of 2011, it has a population of 731 people, in 117 households.

The 1961 census recorded Fakhrul Hasan Khera (as "Fakrul Hasan Khera") as comprising 3 hamlets, with a total population of 186 people (110 male and 76 female), in 40 households and 37 physical houses. The area of the village was given as 286 acres.

The 1981 census recorded Fakhrul Hasan Khera (as "Fakhrulnasan Khera") as having a population of 382 people, in 82 households, and having an area of 116.15 hectares. The main staple foods were given as wheat and rice.
