= Kasehti =

- Village
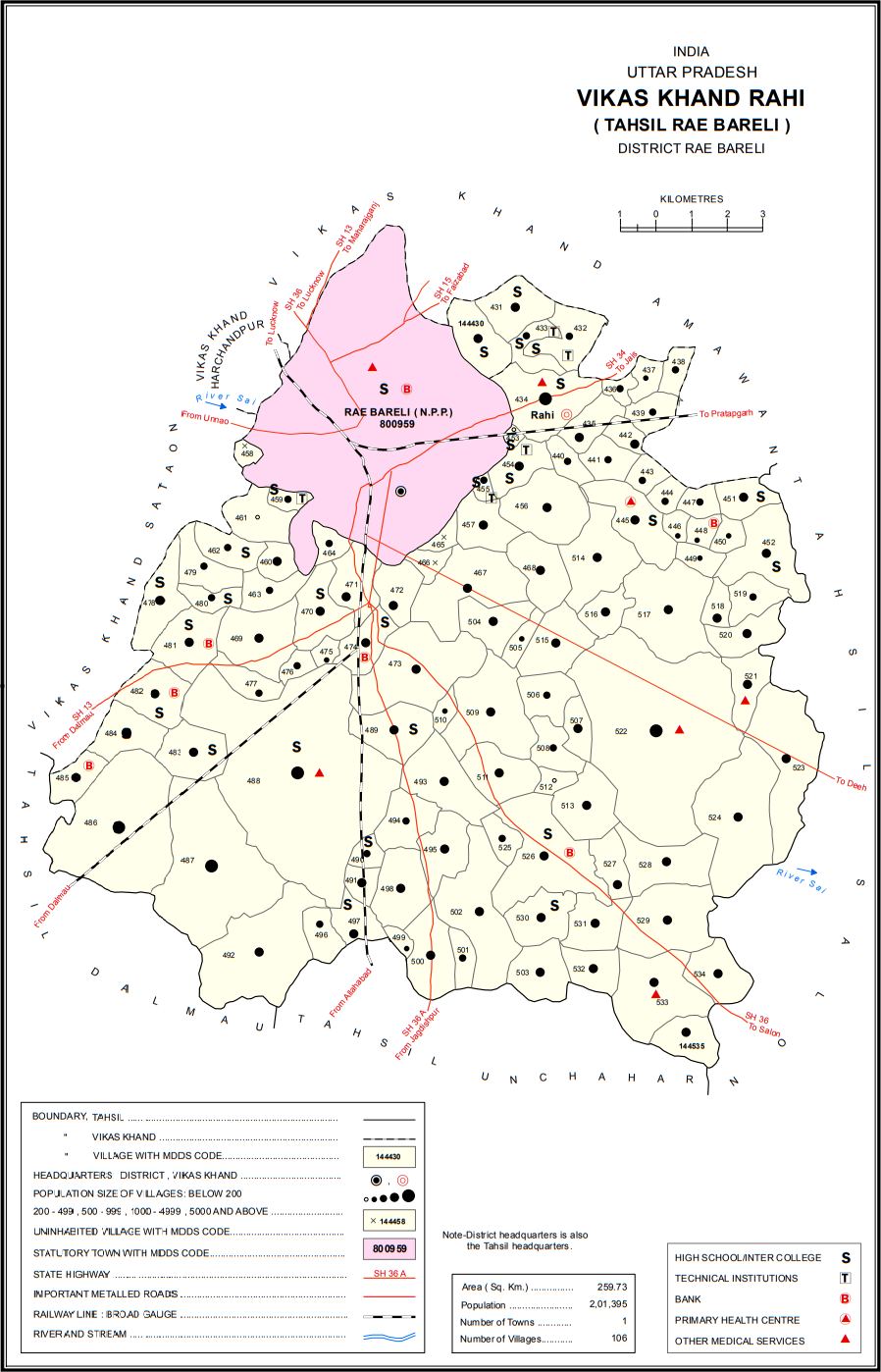
- Map showing Kasehti (#431) in Rahi CD block

- Location in Uttar Pradesh, India
- Coordinates: 26.258848°N 81.291424°E
- Country India: India
- State: Uttar Pradesh
- District: Raebareli

Area
  - Total: 2.325 km^{2} (0.898 sq mi)

Population (2011)
  - Total: 1,400
  - Density: 600/km^{2} (1,600/sq mi)

Languages
  - Official: Hindi
- Time zone: UTC+5:30 (IST)
- Vehicle registration: UP-35

Kasehti is a village in Rahi block of Rae Bareli district, Uttar Pradesh, India. It is located 8 km from Rae Bareli, the district headquarters. As of 2011, it has a population of 1,400 people, in 271 households. It has one primary school and no healthcare facilities.

The 1961 census recorded Kasehti as comprising 3 hamlets, with a total population of 516 people (267 male and 249 female), in 100 households and 95 physical houses. The area of the village was given as 571 acres.

The 1981 census recorded Kasehti as having a population of 709 people, in 130 households, and having an area of 232.70 hectares. The main staple foods were given as wheat and rice.
