= Tala Gopalpur =

Tala Gopalpur Tāla Gopālpur
- Village
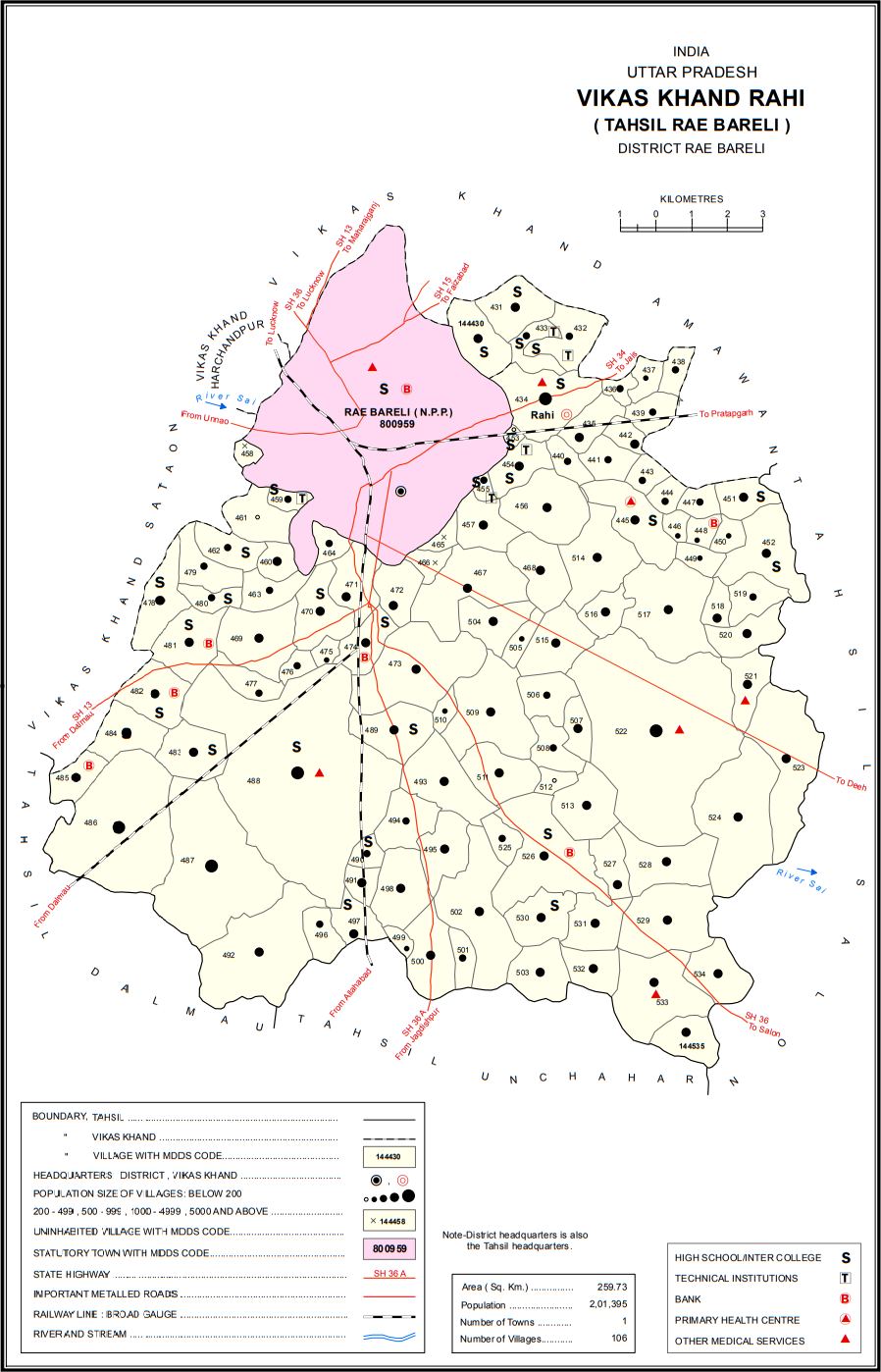
- Map showing Tala Gopalpur (#528) in Rahi CD block

- Location in Uttar Pradesh, India
- Coordinates: 26.122039°N 81.340833°E
- Country India: India
- State: Uttar Pradesh
- District: Raebareli

Area
  - Total: 3.445 km^{2} (1.330 sq mi)

Population (2011)
  - Total: 1,902
  - Density: 552.1/km^{2} (1,430/sq mi)

Languages
  - Official: Hindi
- Time zone: UTC+5:30 (IST)
- Vehicle registration: UP-35

Tala Gopalpur is a village in Rahi block of Rae Bareli district, Uttar Pradesh, India. It is located 9 km from Rae Bareli, the district headquarters. As of 2011, it has a population of 1,902 people, in 347 households. It has one primary school and no healthcare facilities.

The 1961 census recorded Tala Gopalpur as comprising 5 hamlets, with a total population of 778 people (387 male and 391 female), in 168 households and 163 physical houses. The area of the village was given as 870 acres.

The 1981 census recorded Tala Gopalpur as having a population of 1,072 people, in 200 households, and having an area of 344.40 hectares. The main staple foods were given as wheat and rice.
