= Umra, Raebareli =

Umra
- Village
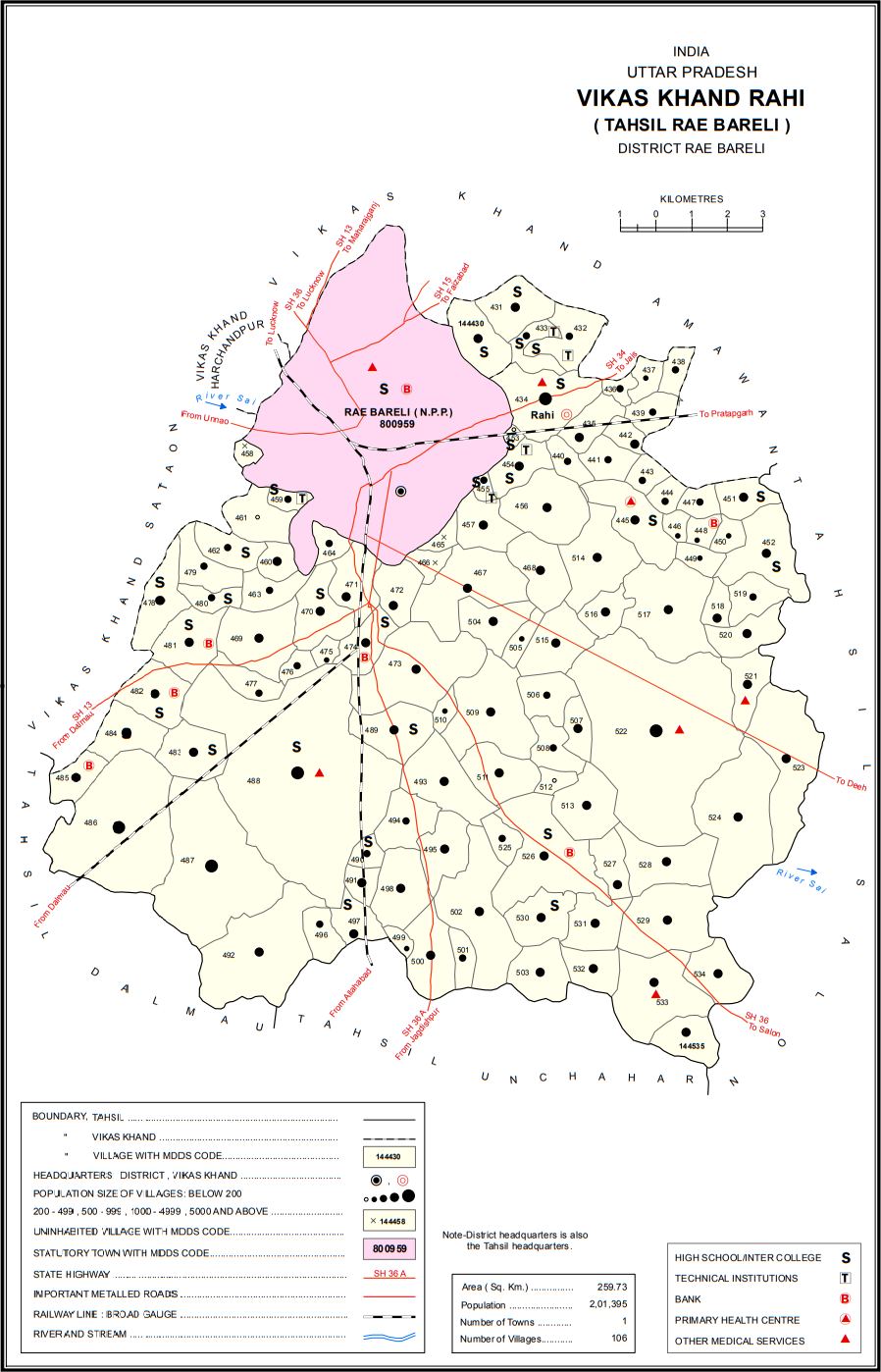
- Map showing Umra (#144430) in Rahi CD block

- Location in Uttar Pradesh, India
- Coordinates: 26.249818°N 81.2815°E
- Country India: India
- State: Uttar Pradesh
- District: Raebareli

Area
  - Total: 2.515 km^{2} (0.971 sq mi)

Population (2011)
  - Total: 1,916
  - Density: 761.8/km^{2} (1,973/sq mi)

Languages
  - Official: Hindi
- Time zone: UTC+5:30 (IST)
- Vehicle registration: UP-35

Umra is a village in Rahi block of Rae Bareli district, Uttar Pradesh, India. It is located 9 km from Rae Bareli, the district headquarters. As of 2011, it has a population of 1,916 people, in 344 households. It has one primary school and no healthcare facilities.

The 1961 census recorded Umra as comprising 2 hamlets, with a total population of 503 people (250 male and 253 female), in 96 households and 91 physical houses. The area of the village was given as 632 acres and it had a post office at that point.

The 1981 census recorded Umra as having a population of 811 people, in 192 households, and having an area of 251.32 hectares. The main staple foods were given as wheat and rice.
