= Anti Naugawan =

Anti Naugawan Anti Naugawān
- Village
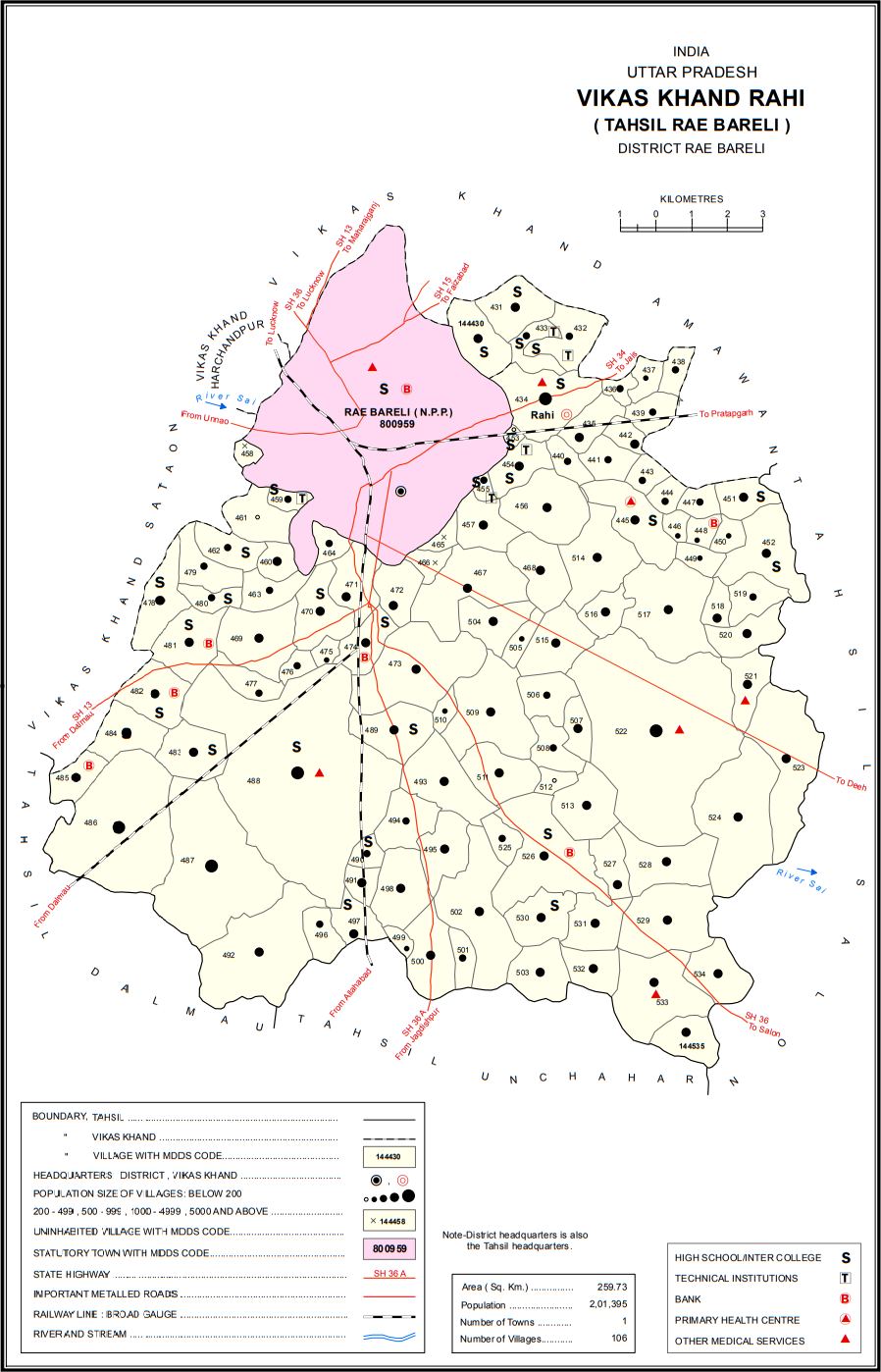
- Map showing Anti Naugawan (#523) in Rahi CD block

- Location in Uttar Pradesh, India
- Coordinates: 26.150992°N 81.360722°E
- Country: India
- State: Uttar Pradesh
- District: Raebareli

Area
  - Total: 5.242 km^{2} (2.024 sq mi)

Population (2011)
  - Total: 2,668
  - Density: 509.0/km^{2} (1,318/sq mi)

Languages
  - Official: Hindi
- Time zone: UTC+5:30 (IST)
- Vehicle registration: UP-35

Anti Naugawan is a village in Rahi block of Rae Bareli district, Uttar Pradesh, India. It is located 15 km from Rae Bareli, the district headquarters. As of 2011, it has a total population of 2,668 people, in 464 households. It has a primary school and no medical facilities and it does not host a permanent market or a weekly haat. It belongs to the nyaya panchayat of Lodhwari.

The 1951 census recorded Anti Naugawan as comprising 12 hamlets, with a population of 867 people (432 male and 435 female), in 190 households and 184 physical houses. The area of the village was given as 1,295 acres. 4 residents were literate, all male. The village was listed as belonging to the pargana of Rae Bareli South and the thana of Nasirabad.

The 1961 census recorded Anti Naugawan as comprising 12 hamlets, with a population of 954 people (536 male and 418 female), in 188 households and 162 physical houses. The area of the village was given as 1,295 acres.

The 1981 census recorded Anti Naugawan as having a population of 1,459 people, in 253 households, and having an area of 502.64 hectares. The main staple foods were listed as wheat and rice.

The 1991 census recorded Anti Naugawan as having a total population of 1,539 people (877 male and 662 female), in 297 households and 295 physical houses. The area of the village was listed as 524 hectares. Members of the 0-6 age group numbered 282, or 18% of the total; this group was 54% male (152) and 46% female (130). Members of scheduled castes numbered 314, or 20% of the village's total population, while no members of scheduled tribes were recorded. The literacy rate of the village was 15% (215 men and 13 women). 512 people were classified as main workers (all men), while 262 people were classified as marginal workers (all women); the remaining 765 residents were non-workers. The breakdown of main workers by employment category was as follows: 473 cultivators (i.e. people who owned or leased their own land); 7 agricultural labourers (i.e. people who worked someone else's land in return for payment); 2 workers in livestock, forestry, fishing, hunting, plantations, orchards, etc.; 0 in mining and quarrying; 0 household industry workers; 11 workers employed in other manufacturing, processing, service, and repair roles; 1 construction worker; 2 employed in trade and commerce; 5 employed in transport, storage, and communications; and 11 in other services.
