= Sarai Muhammad Sharif =

Sarai Muhammad Sharif Sarāi Muhammad Sharif
- Village
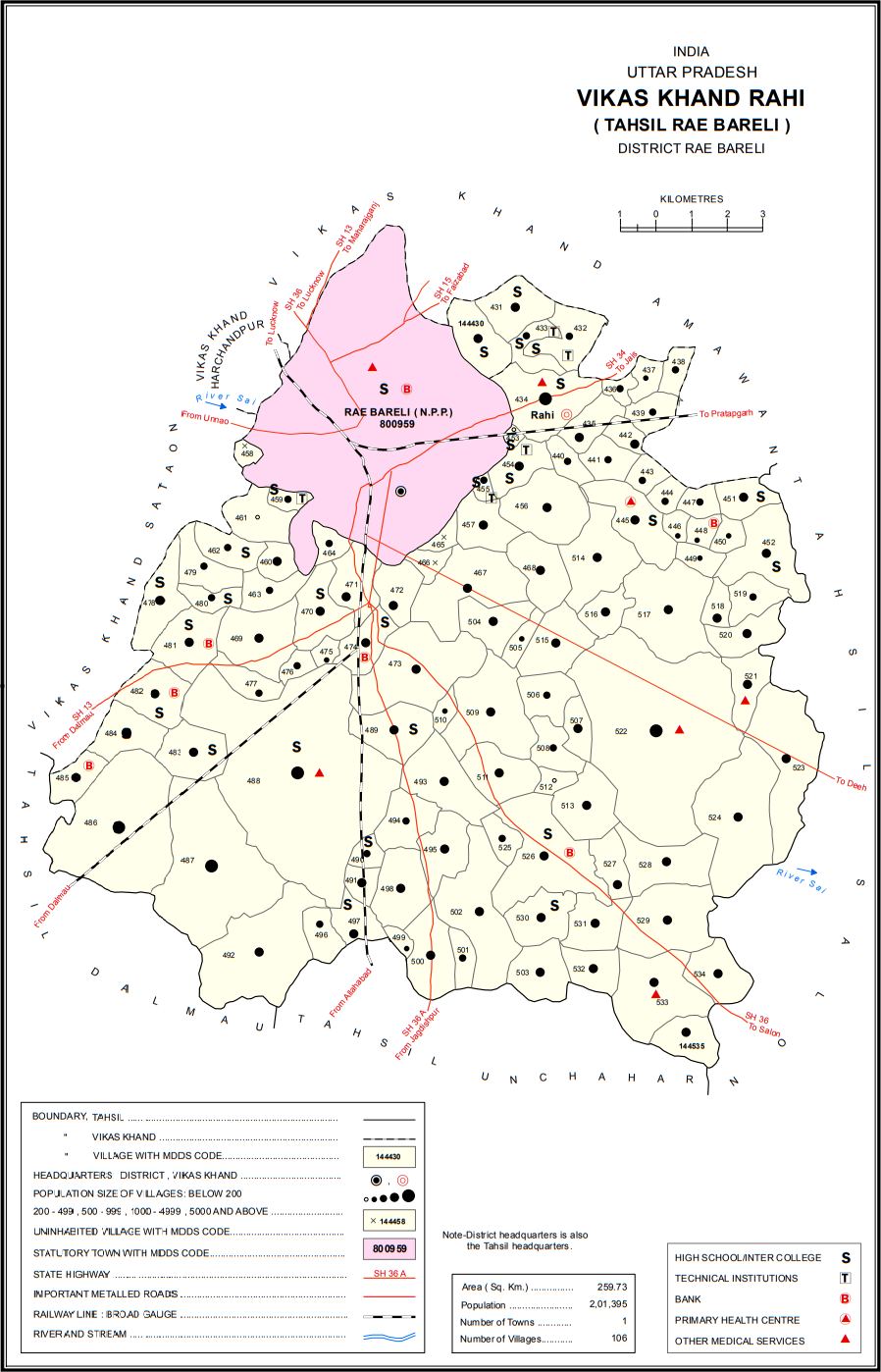
- Map showing Sarai Muhammad Sharif (#500) in Rahi CD block

- Location in Uttar Pradesh, India
- Coordinates: 26.090977°N 81.260511°E
- Country India: India
- State: Uttar Pradesh
- District: Raebareli

Area
  - Total: 1.755 km^{2} (0.678 sq mi)

Population (2011)
  - Total: 1,313
  - Density: 748.1/km^{2} (1,938/sq mi)

Languages
  - Official: Hindi
- Time zone: UTC+5:30 (IST)
- Vehicle registration: UP-35

Sarai Muhammad Sharif is a village in Rahi block of Rae Bareli district, Uttar Pradesh, India. It is located 9 km from Rae Bareli, the district headquarters. As of 2011, it has a population of 1,400 people, in 271 households. It has one primary school and no healthcare facilities.

The 1961 census recorded Sarai Muhammad Sharif (as "Sarai Mohammad Sarif") as comprising 5 hamlets, with a total population of 542 people (280 male and 262 female), in 102 households and 94 physical houses. The area of the village was given as 479 acres.

The 1981 census recorded Sarai Muhammad Sharif (as "Sarai Mohammad Sharif") as having a population of 745 people, in 143 households, and having an area of 193.45 hectares. The main staple foods were given as wheat and bajra.
