= Bani, Rahi =

Bani
- Village
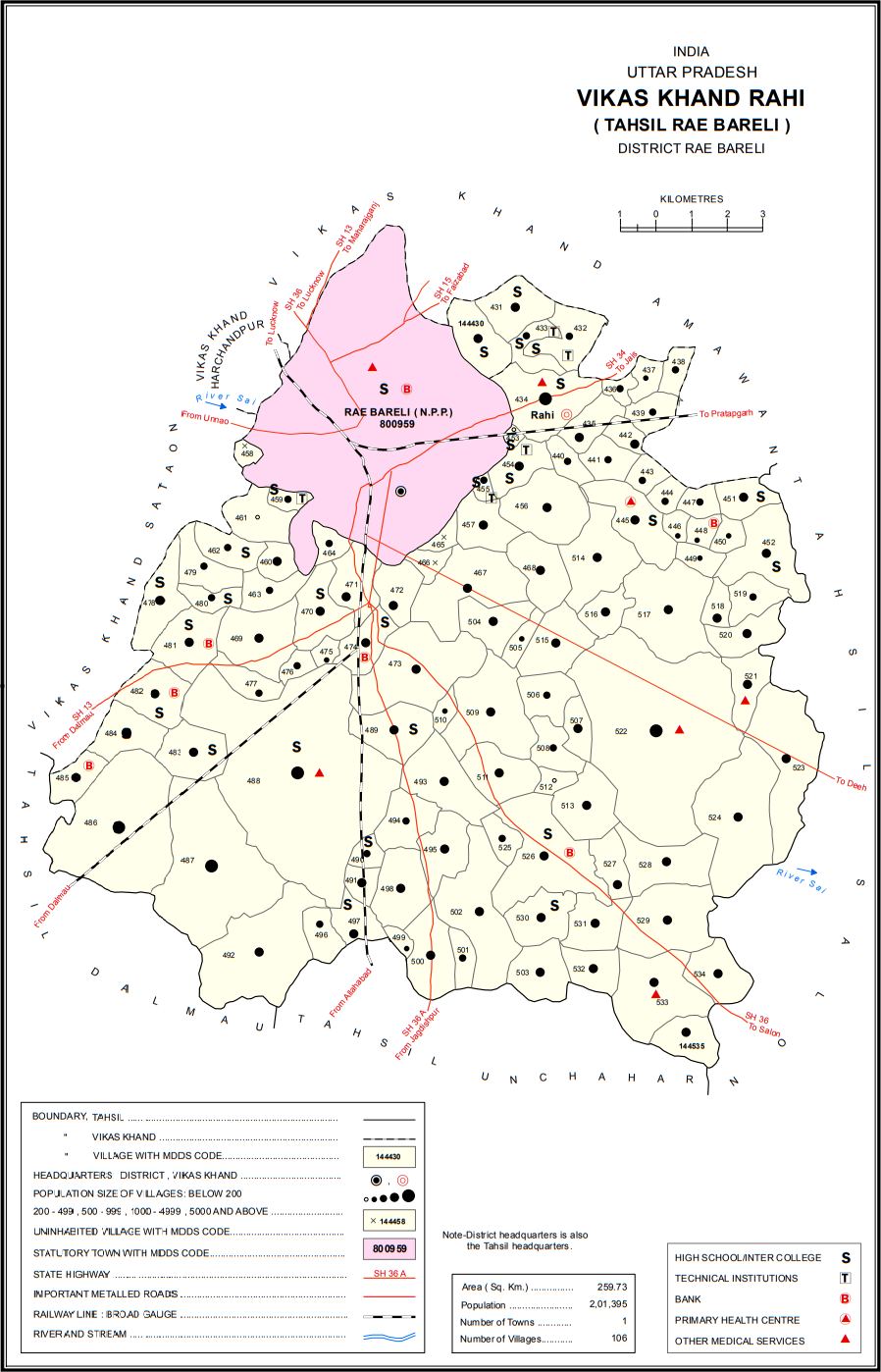
- Map showing Bani (#447) in Rahi CD block

- Location in Uttar Pradesh, India
- Coordinates: 26.212024°N 81.341498°E
- Country India: India
- State: Uttar Pradesh
- District: Raebareli

Area
  - Total: 0.862 km^{2} (0.333 sq mi)

Population (2011)
  - Total: 672
  - Density: 780/km^{2} (2,020/sq mi)

Languages
  - Official: Hindi
- Time zone: UTC+5:30 (IST)
- Vehicle registration: UP-35

Bani is a village in Rahi block of Rae Bareli district, Uttar Pradesh, India. It is located 7 km from Rae Bareli, the district headquarters. As of 2011, it has a population of 672 people, in 136 households. It has no schools and no healthcare facilities.

The 1961 census recorded Bani as comprising 2 hamlets, with a total population of 291 people (152 male and 139 female), in 63 households and 62 physical houses. The area of the village was given as 210 acres.

The 1981 census recorded Bani as having a population of 401 people, in 81 households, and having an area of 87.42 hectares. The main staple foods were given as wheat and rice.
