= Bela Gusisi =

Bela Gusisi Belā Gusesi
- Village
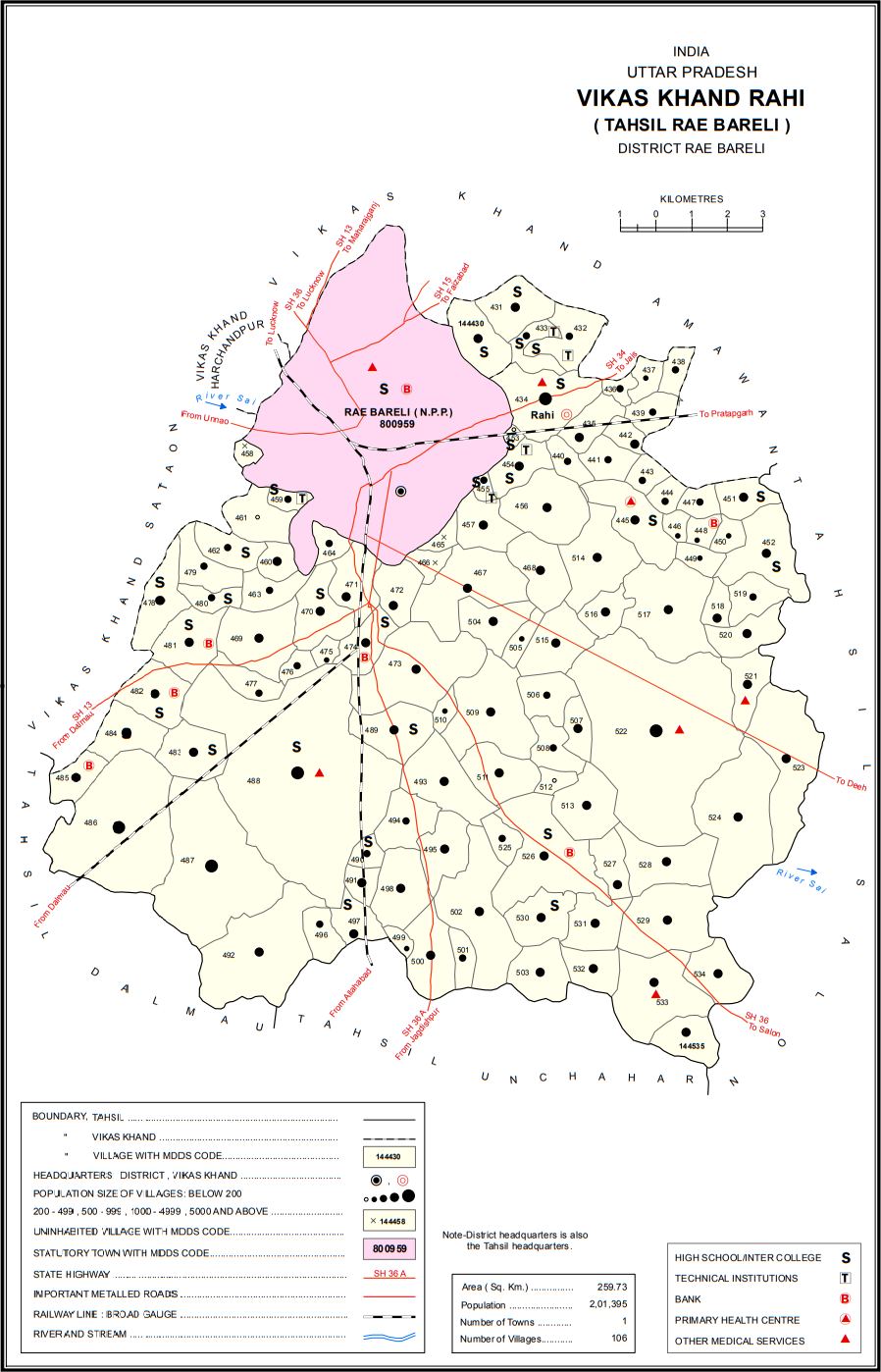
- Map showing Bela Gusisi (#487) in Rahi CD block

- Location in Uttar Pradesh, India
- Coordinates: 26.115971°N 81.211472°E
- Country: India
- State: Uttar Pradesh
- District: Raebareli

Area
  - Total: 10.685 km^{2} (4.126 sq mi)

Population (2011)
  - Total: 7,320
  - Density: 685/km^{2} (1,770/sq mi)

Languages
  - Official: Hindi
- Time zone: UTC+5:30 (IST)
- Vehicle registration: UP-35

Bela Gusisi is a village in Rahi block of Rae Bareli district, Uttar Pradesh, India. It is located 13 km from Rae Bareli, the district headquarters. As of 2011, it has a population of 7,320 people, in 1,301 households. It has one primary school, no medical facilities and does not host a weekly haat or a permanent market. It belongs to the nyaya panchayat of Bela Bhela.

The 1951 census recorded Bela Gusisi as comprising 20 hamlets, with a population of 2,188 people (1,103 male and 1,085 female), in 445 households and 426 physical houses. The area of the village was given as 2,738 acres. 153 residents were literate, 137 male and 16 female. The village was listed as belonging to the pargana of Rae Bareli South and the thana of Jagatpur.

The 1961 census recorded Bela Gusisi as comprising 20 hamlets, with a total population of 2,560 people (1,248 male and 1,312 female), in 499 households and 487 physical houses. The area of the village was given as 2,738 acres and it had a post office at that point.

The 1981 census recorded Bela Gusisi (as "Bela Gusasi") as having a population of 4,029 people, in 725 households, and having an area of 1,027.53 hectares. The main staple foods were listed as wheat and rice.

The 1991 census recorded Bela Gusisi as having a total population of 4,975 people (2,543 male and 2,432 female), in 836 households and 798 physical houses. The area of the village was listed as 1,069 hectares. Members of the 0-6 age group numbered 1,052, or 21% of the total; this group was 50% male (521) and 50% female (531). Members of scheduled castes numbered 1,336, or 27% of the village's total population, while no members of scheduled tribes were recorded. The literacy rate of the village was 29% (1,092 men and 336 women). 1,535 people were classified as main workers (1,247 men and 288 women), while 196 people were classified as marginal workers (11 men and 185 women); the remaining 3,244 residents were non-workers. The breakdown of main workers by employment category was as follows: 1,066 cultivators (i.e. people who owned or leased their own land); 241 agricultural labourers (i.e. people who worked someone else's land in return for payment); 11 workers in livestock, forestry, fishing, hunting, plantations, orchards, etc.; 0 in mining and quarrying; 17 household industry workers; 70 workers employed in other manufacturing, processing, service, and repair roles; 17 construction workers; 30 employed in trade and commerce; 16 employed in transport, storage, and communications; and 67 in other services.
