= Chak Lodipur =

- Village
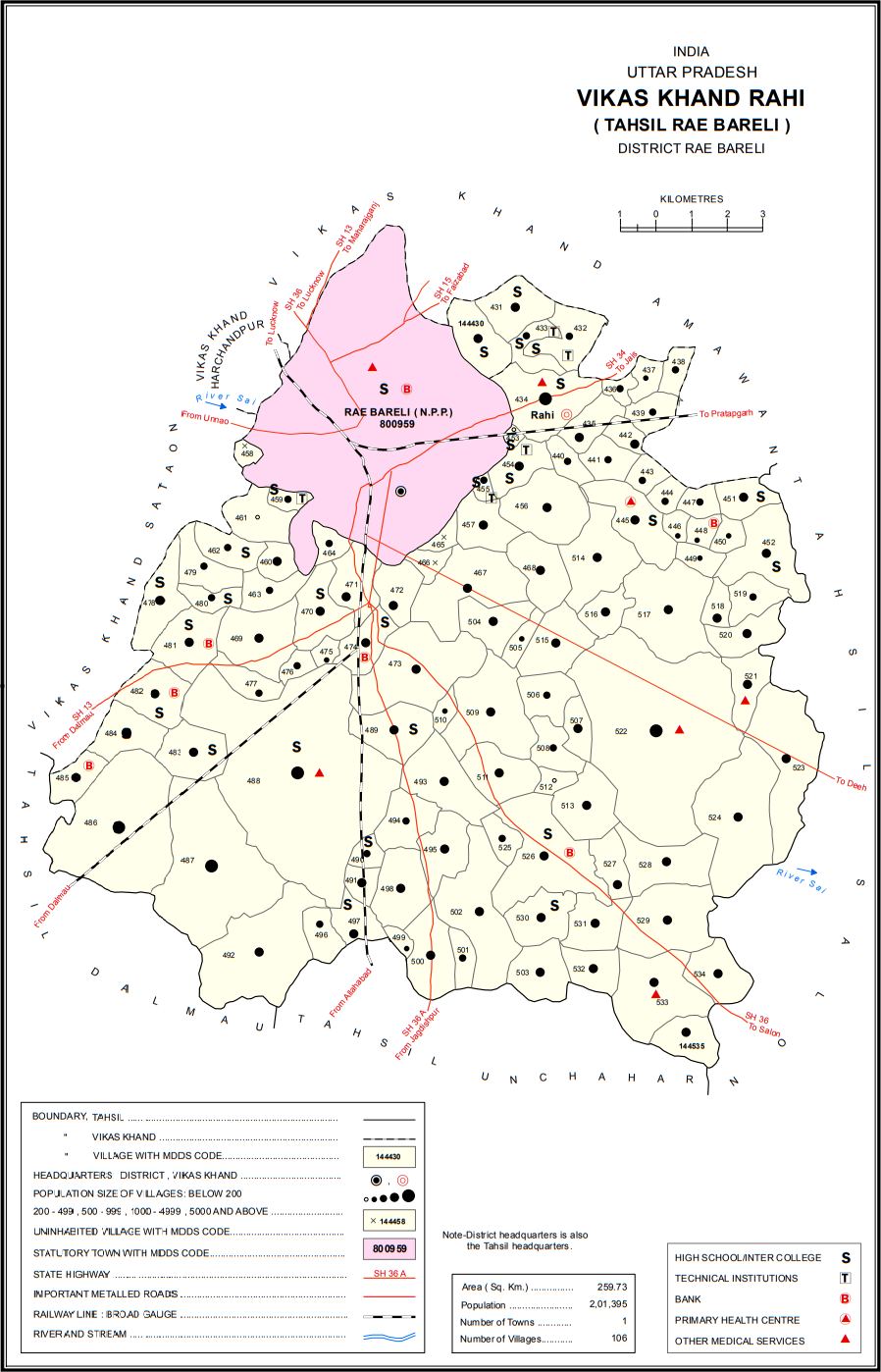
- Map showing Chak Lodipur (#448) in Rahi CD block

- Location in Uttar Pradesh, India
- Coordinates: 26.204236°N 81.33963°E
- Country: India
- State: Uttar Pradesh
- District: Raebareli

Area
  - Total: 0.692 km^{2} (0.267 sq mi)

Population (2011)
  - Total: 449
  - Density: 649/km^{2} (1,680/sq mi)

Languages
  - Official: Hindi
- Time zone: UTC+5:30 (IST)
- Vehicle registration: UP-35

Chak Lodipur is a village in Rahi block of Rae Bareli district, Uttar Pradesh, India. It is located 8 km from Rae Bareli, the district headquarters. As of 2011, the village population is 449 people, in 89 households. It has one primary school, no medical facilities and does not host a weekly haat or a permanent market. It belongs to the nyaya panchayat of Rustampur.

The 1951 census recorded Chak Lodipur as comprising 1 hamlet, with a total population of 194 people (97 male and 97 female), in 41 households and 39 physical houses. The area of the village was given as 168 acres. 18 residents were literate, all male. The village was listed as belonging to the pargana of Rae Bareli North and the thana of Kotwali.

The 1961 census recorded Chak Lodipur as comprising 1 hamlet, with a total population of 256 people (136 male and 120 female), in 47 households and 44 physical houses. The area of the village was given as 168 acres.

The 1981 census recorded Chak Lodipur as having a population of 271 people, in 52 households, and having an area of 68.39 hectares. The main staple foods were listed as wheat and rice.

The 1991 census recorded Chak Lodipur as having a total population of 304 people (158 male and 146 female), in 59 households and 59 physical houses. The area of the village was listed as 68 hectares. Members of the 0-6 age group numbered 52, or 17% of the total; this group was 46% male (24) and 54% female (28). Members of scheduled castes numbered 96, or 31.5% of the village's total population, while no members of scheduled tribes were recorded. The literacy rate of the village was 30% (71 men and 20 women). 113 people were classified as main workers (87 men and 26 women), while 0 people were classified as marginal workers; the remaining 191 residents were non-workers. The breakdown of main workers by employment category was as follows: 89 cultivators (i.e. people who owned or leased their own land); 15 agricultural labourers (i.e. people who worked someone else's land in return for payment); 0 workers in livestock, forestry, fishing, hunting, plantations, orchards, etc.; 0 in mining and quarrying; 0 household industry workers; 5 workers employed in other manufacturing, processing, service, and repair roles; 0 construction workers; 1 employed in trade and commerce; 1 employed in transport, storage, and communications; and 2 in other services.
