= Bela Khara =

Bela Khara Belā Khāra
- Village
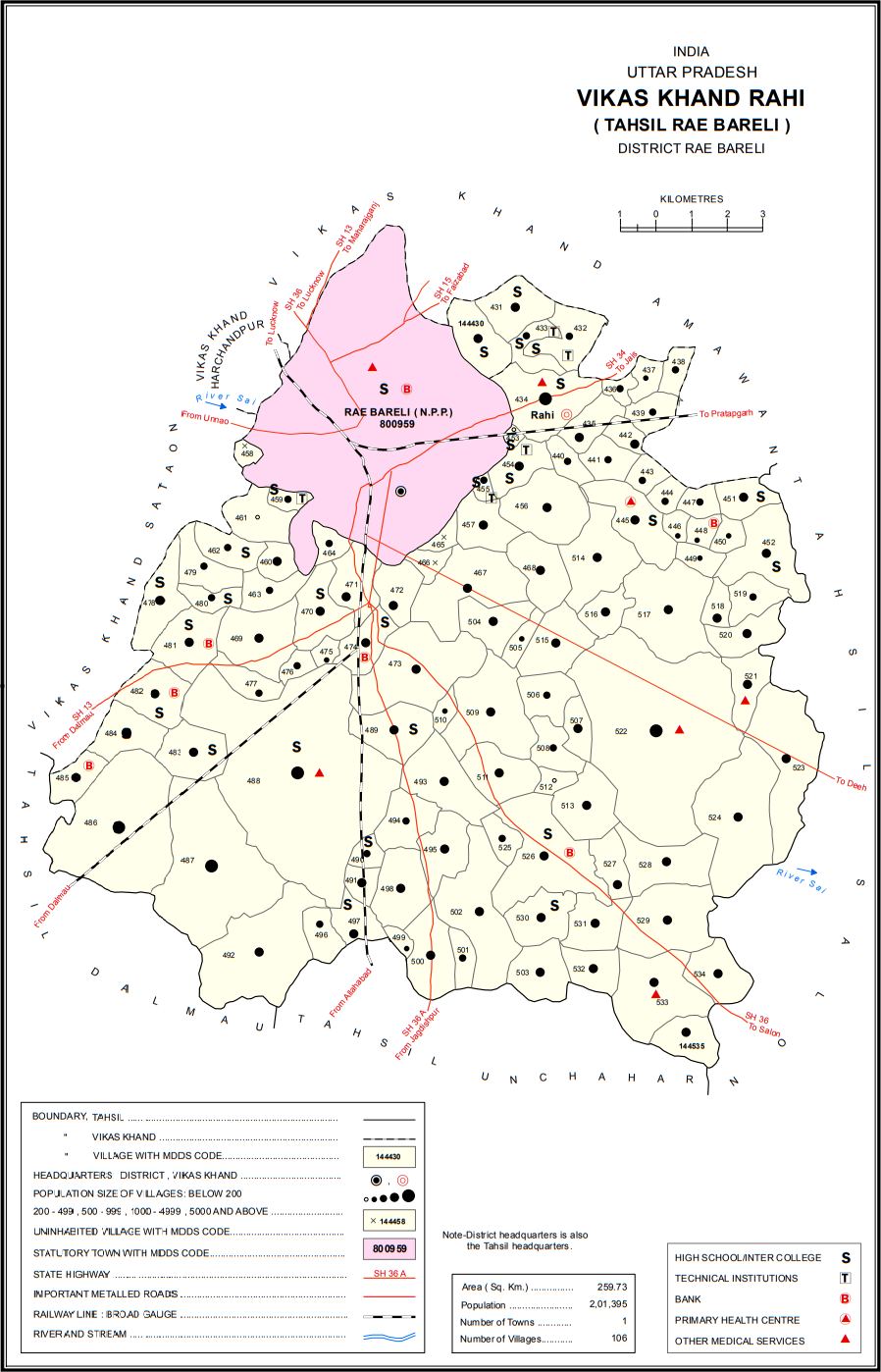
- Map showing Bela Khara (#486) in Rahi CD block

- Location in Uttar Pradesh, India
- Coordinates: 26.124199°N 81.179552°E
- Country: India
- State: Uttar Pradesh
- District: Raebareli

Area
  - Total: 8.875 km^{2} (3.427 sq mi)

Population (2011)
  - Total: 5,928
  - Density: 667.9/km^{2} (1,730/sq mi)

Languages
  - Official: Hindi
- Time zone: UTC+5:30 (IST)
- Vehicle registration: UP-33

Bela Khara is a village in Rahi block of Rae Bareli district, Uttar Pradesh, India. It is located 15 km from Rae Bareli, the district headquarters. As of 2011, its total population was 5,928 people, in 1,071 households. It has one primary school and no medical facilities and it hosts both a weekly haat and a permanent market. It belongs to the nyaya panchayat of Bela Bhela.

The 1951 census recorded Bela Khara as comprising 13 hamlets, with a total population of 1,832 people (940 male and 892 female), in 381 households and 342 physical houses. The area of the village was given as 2,363 acres. 65 residents were literate, 60 male and 5 female. The village was listed as belonging to the pargana of Rae Bareli South and the thana of Jagatpur.

The 1961 census recorded Bela Khara as comprising 13 hamlets, with a population of 2,096 people (1,084 male and 1,012 female), in 424 households and 413 physical houses. The area of the village was given as 2,363 acres and it had a post office at that point.

The 1981 census recorded Bela Khara as having a population of 2,992 people, in 594 households, and having an area of 920.29 hectares. The main staple foods were listed as wheat and rice.

The 1991 census recorded Bela Khara as having a total population of 3,779 people (2,018 male and 1,761 female), in 724 households and 713 physical houses. The area of the village was listed as 920 hectares. Members of the 0-6 age group numbered 757, or 20% of the total; this group was 55% male (419) and 45% female (338). Members of scheduled castes numbered 829, or 22% of the village's total population, while no members of scheduled tribes were recorded. The literacy rate of the village was 21% (655 men and 151 women). 1,145 people were classified as main workers (1,024 men and 121 women), while 164 people were classified as marginal workers (25 men and 139 women); the remaining 2,470 residents were non-workers. The breakdown of main workers by employment category was as follows: 793 cultivators (i.e. people who owned or leased their own land); 208 agricultural labourers (i.e. people who worked someone else's land in return for payment); 10 workers in livestock, forestry, fishing, hunting, plantations, orchards, etc.; 0 in mining and quarrying; 12 household industry workers; 27 workers employed in other manufacturing, processing, service, and repair roles; 2 construction workers; 26 employed in trade and commerce; 14 employed in transport, storage, and communications; and 53 in other services.
