= Raipur Maheri =

Raipur Maheri Rāipur Maheri
- Village
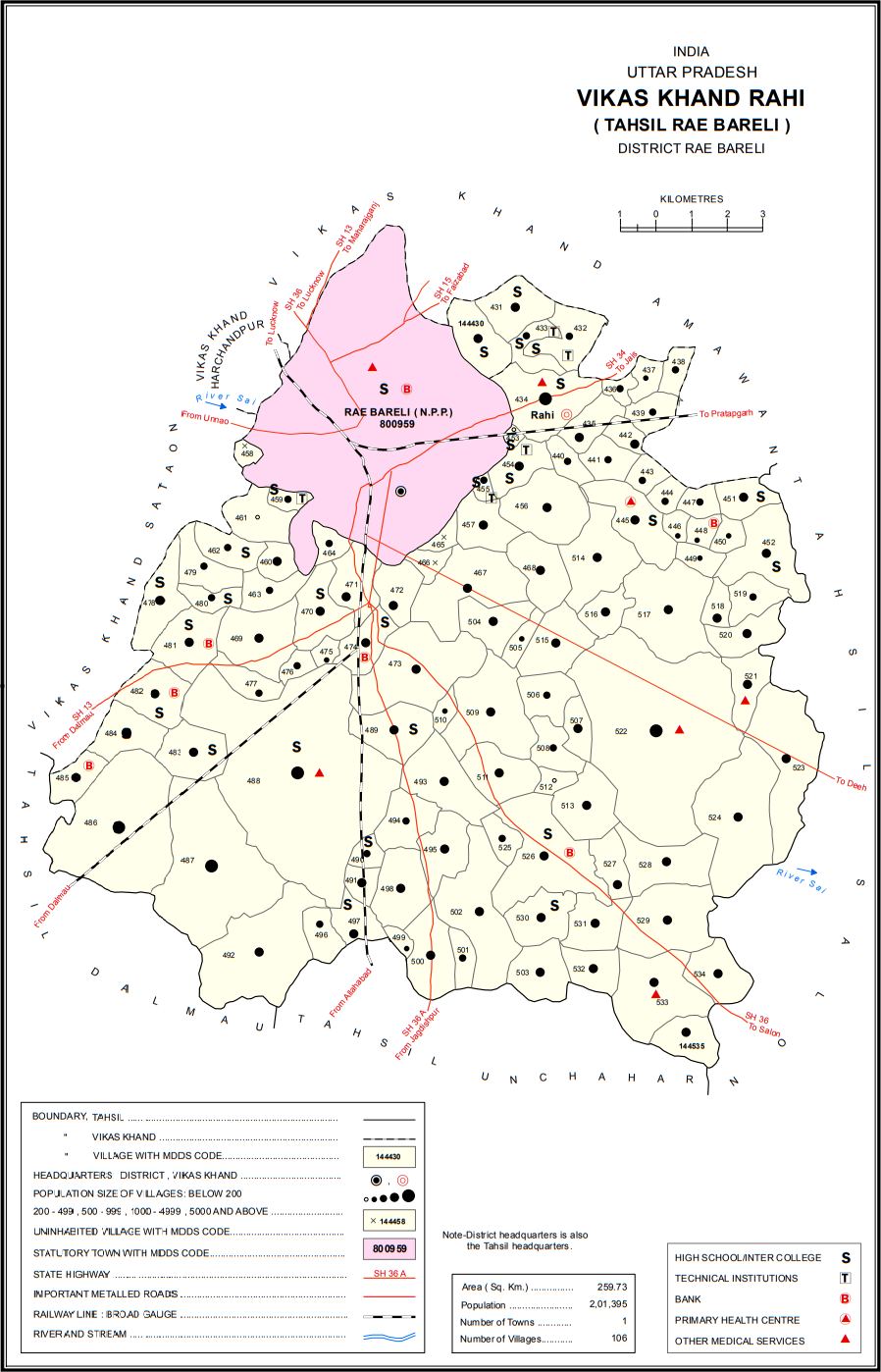
- Map showing Raipur Maheri (#511) in Rahi CD block

- Location in Uttar Pradesh, India
- Coordinates: 26.145483°N 81.281479°E
- Country: India
- State: Uttar Pradesh
- District: Raebareli

Area
  - Total: 2.243 km^{2} (0.866 sq mi)

Population (2011)
  - Total: 1,753
  - Density: 781.5/km^{2} (2,024/sq mi)

Languages
  - Official: Hindi
- Time zone: UTC+5:30 (IST)
- Vehicle registration: UP-35

Raipur Maheri is a village in Rahi block of Rae Bareli district, Uttar Pradesh, India. It is located 10 km from Rae Bareli, the district headquarters. As of 2011, it has a population of 1,753 people, in 314 households. It has one primary school, no medical facilities and does not host a weekly haat or a permanent market. The village belongs to the nyaya panchayat of Bhadokhar.

The 1951 census recorded Raipur Maheri as comprising 5 hamlets, with a total population of 657 people (333 male and 324 female), in 147 households and 134 physical houses. The area of the village was given as 545 acres. 40 residents were literate, 32 male and 8 female. The village was listed as belonging to the pargana of Rae Bareli South and the thana of Jagatpur.

The 1961 census recorded Raipur Maheri as comprising 5 hamlets, with a total population of 725 people (359 male and 366 female), in 158 households and 153 physical houses. The area of the village was given as 545 acres.

The 1981 census recorded Raipur Maheri (as "Raepur Maheri") as having a population of 1,019 people, in 191 households, and having an area of 217.73 hectares. The main staple foods were listed as wheat and rice.

The 1991 census recorded Raipur Maheri (as "Rampur Maheri") as having a total population of 1,237 people (627 male and 610 female), in 233 households and 233 physical houses. The area of the village was listed as 216 hectares. Members of the 0-6 age group numbered 231, or 19% of the total; this group was 50% male (115) and 50% female (116). Members of scheduled castes numbered 239, or 19% of the village's total population, while no members of scheduled tribes were recorded. The literacy rate of the village was 30.5% (322 men and 56 women). 356 people were classified as main workers (315 men and 41 women), while 136 people were classified as marginal workers (10 men and 126 women); the remaining 745 residents were non-workers. The breakdown of main workers by employment category was as follows: 238 cultivators (i.e. people who owned or leased their own land); 64 agricultural labourers (i.e. people who worked someone else's land in return for payment); 1 worker in livestock, forestry, fishing, hunting, plantations, orchards, etc.; 0 in mining and quarrying; 0 household industry workers; 9 workers employed in other manufacturing, processing, service, and repair roles; 1 construction worker; 6 employed in trade and commerce; 8 employed in transport, storage, and communications; and 29 in other services.
