= Jhakrasi =

Jhakrasi Jhakrāsi
- Village
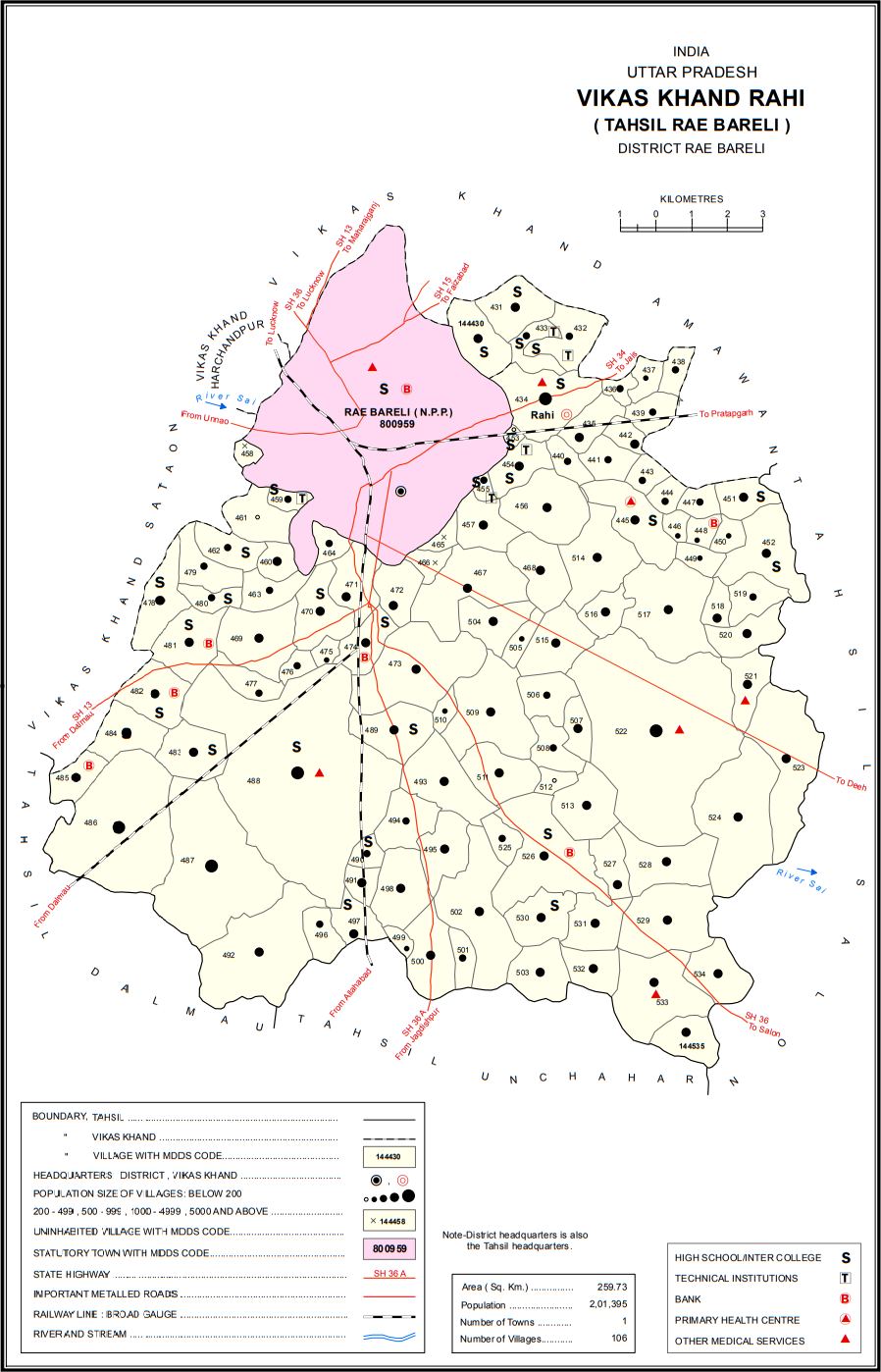
- Map showing Jhakrasi (#473) in Rahi CD block

- Location in Uttar Pradesh, India
- Coordinates: 26.166533°N 81.260342°E
- Country India: India
- State: Uttar Pradesh
- District: Raebareli

Area
  - Total: 4.818 km^{2} (1.860 sq mi)

Population (2011)
  - Total: 3,828
  - Density: 794.5/km^{2} (2,058/sq mi)

Languages
  - Official: Hindi
- Time zone: UTC+5:30 (IST)
- Vehicle registration: UP-35

Jhakrasi is a village in Rahi block of Rae Bareli district, Uttar Pradesh, India. It is located 6 km from Rae Bareli, the district headquarters. As of 2011, it has a population of 3,828 people, in 720 households. It has one primary school and no healthcare facilities. Jhakrasi hosts a weekly market on Wednesdays, with leather and goats being the main items traded.

The 1961 census recorded Jhakrasi as comprising 11 hamlets, with a total population of 1,442 people (736 male and 706 female), in 285 households and 242 physical houses. The area of the village was given as 1,176 acres. Average attendance of the Wednesday market was about 400 people.

The 1981 census recorded Jhakrasi as having a population of 2,190 people, in 384 households, and having an area of 509.11 hectares. The main staple foods were given as wheat and rice.
