= Suraj Kunda =

- Village
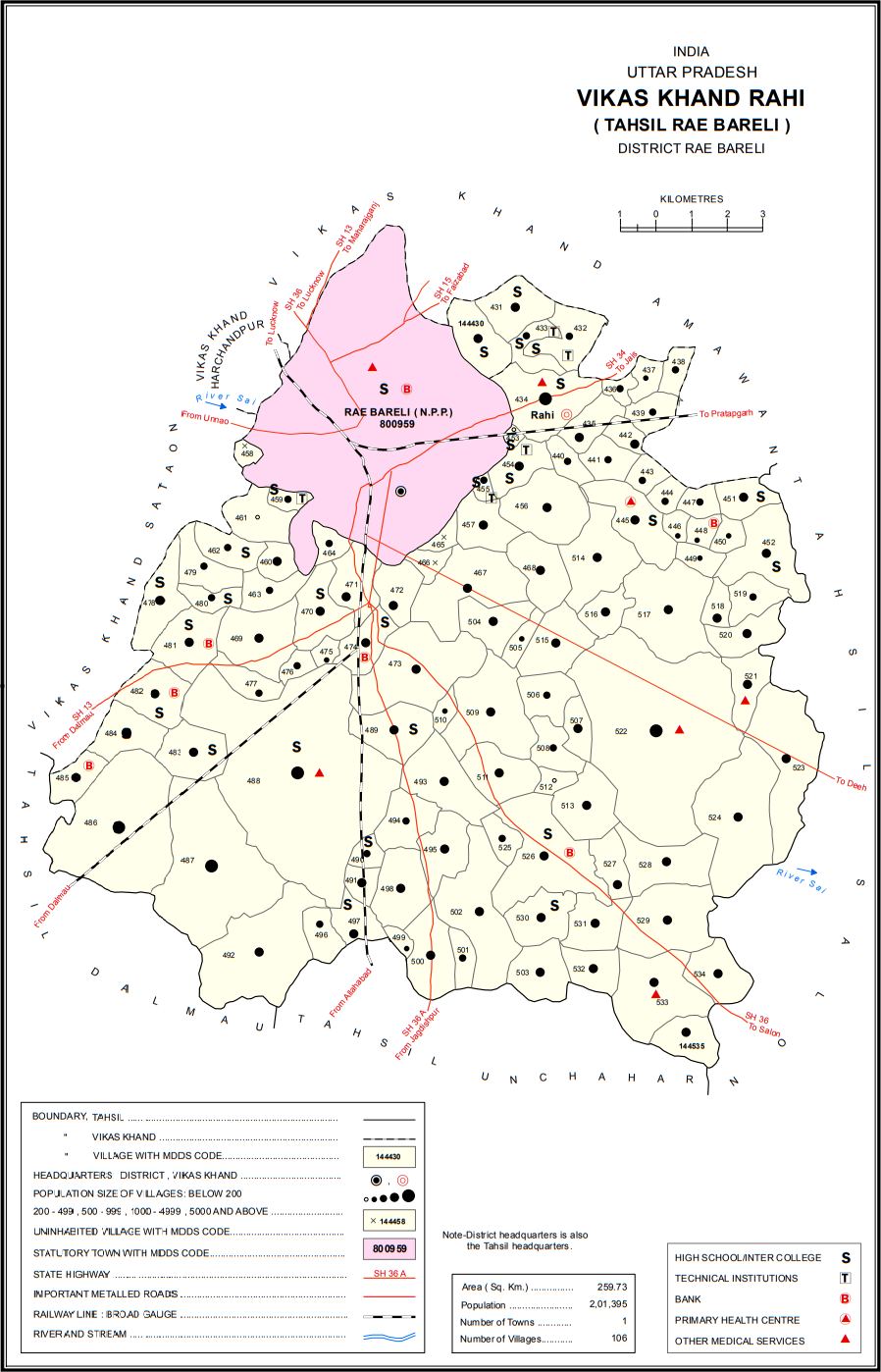
- Map showing Suraj Kunda (#483) in Rahi CD block

- Location in Uttar Pradesh, India
- Coordinates: 26.150997°N 81.205844°E
- Country India: India
- State: Uttar Pradesh
- District: Raebareli

Area
  - Total: 2.736 km^{2} (1.056 sq mi)

Population (2011)
  - Total: 2,196
  - Density: 802.6/km^{2} (2,079/sq mi)

Languages
  - Official: Hindi
- Time zone: UTC+5:30 (IST)
- Vehicle registration: UP-35

Suraj Kunda is a village in Rahi block of Rae Bareli district, Uttar Pradesh, India. It is located 11 km from Rae Bareli, the district headquarters. As of 2011, it has a population of 2,196 people, in 455 households. It has one primary school and no healthcare facilities.

The 1961 census recorded Suraj Kunda as comprising 5 hamlets, with a total population of 812 people (411 male and 401 female), in 159 households and 142 physical houses. The area of the village was given as 659 acres.

The 1981 census recorded Suraj Kunda as having a population of 1,258 people, in 229 households, and having an area of 273.17 hectares. The main staple foods were given as wheat and rice.
