= Kasimpur Baghel =

Kasimpur Baghel Kāsimpur Baghel
- Village
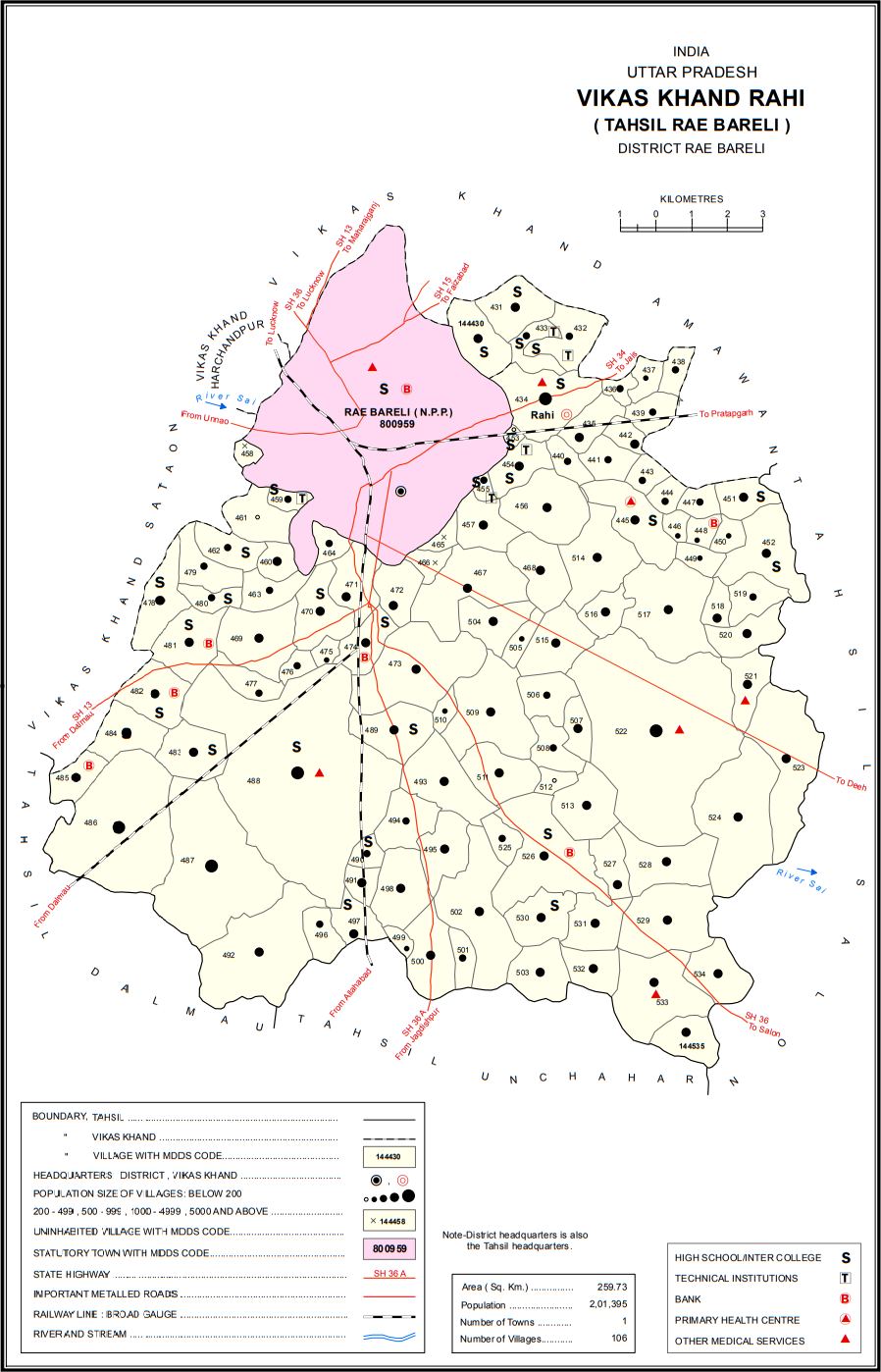
- Map showing Kasimpur Baghel (#437) in Rahi CD block

- Location in Uttar Pradesh, India
- Coordinates: 26.247084°N 81.329503°E
- Country India: India
- State: Uttar Pradesh
- District: Raebareli

Area
  - Total: 1.056 km^{2} (0.408 sq mi)

Population (2011)
  - Total: 410
  - Density: 390/km^{2} (1,000/sq mi)

Languages
  - Official: Hindi
- Time zone: UTC+5:30 (IST)
- Vehicle registration: UP-35

Kasimpur Baghel is a village in Rahi block of Rae Bareli district, Uttar Pradesh, India. It is located 10 km from Rae Bareli, the district headquarters. As of 2011, it has a population of 410 people, in 74 households. It has no schools and no healthcare facilities.

The 1961 census recorded Kasimpur Baghel (as "Qasimpur Baghel") as comprising 2 hamlets, with a total population of 91 people (66 male and 25 female), in 24 households and 24 physical houses. The area of the village was given as 263 acres.

The 1981 census recorded Kasimpur Baghel (as "Kasimpur Bughel") as having a population of 208 people, in 39 households, and having an area of 106.03 hectares. The main staple foods were given as wheat and rice.
