= Khagipur Sandwa =

- Village
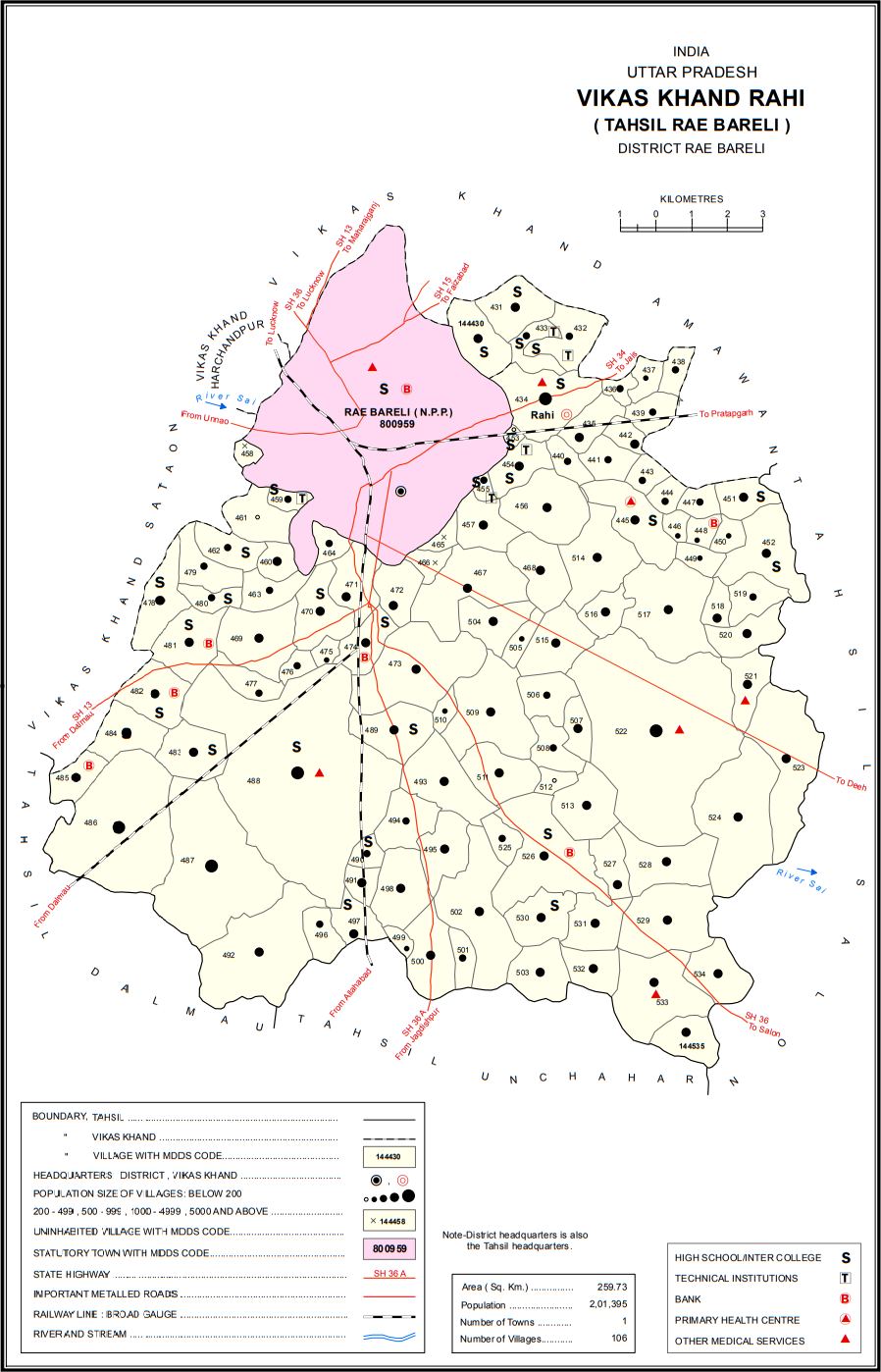
- Map showing Khagipur Sandwa (#482) in Rahi CD block

- Location in Uttar Pradesh, India
- Coordinates: 26.169515°N 81.188632°E
- Country India: India
- State: Uttar Pradesh
- District: Raebareli

Area
  - Total: 2.234 km^{2} (0.863 sq mi)

Population (2011)
  - Total: 2,020
  - Density: 904/km^{2} (2,340/sq mi)

Languages
  - Official: Hindi
- Time zone: UTC+5:30 (IST)
- Vehicle registration: UP-35

Khagipur Sandwa is a village in Rahi block of Rae Bareli district, Uttar Pradesh, India. It is located 10 km from Rae Bareli, the district headquarters. As of 2011, it has a population of 2,020 people, in 375 households. It has one primary school and no healthcare facilities.

The 1961 census recorded Khagipur Sandwa as comprising 7 hamlets, with a total population of 769 people (398 male and 371 female), in 143 households and 132 physical houses. The area of the village was given as 557 acres.

The 1981 census recorded Khagipur Sandwa (as "Khamipur Sandwa") as having a population of 1,146 people, in 217 households. The main staple foods were given as wheat and rice.
