= Paintemau =

- Village
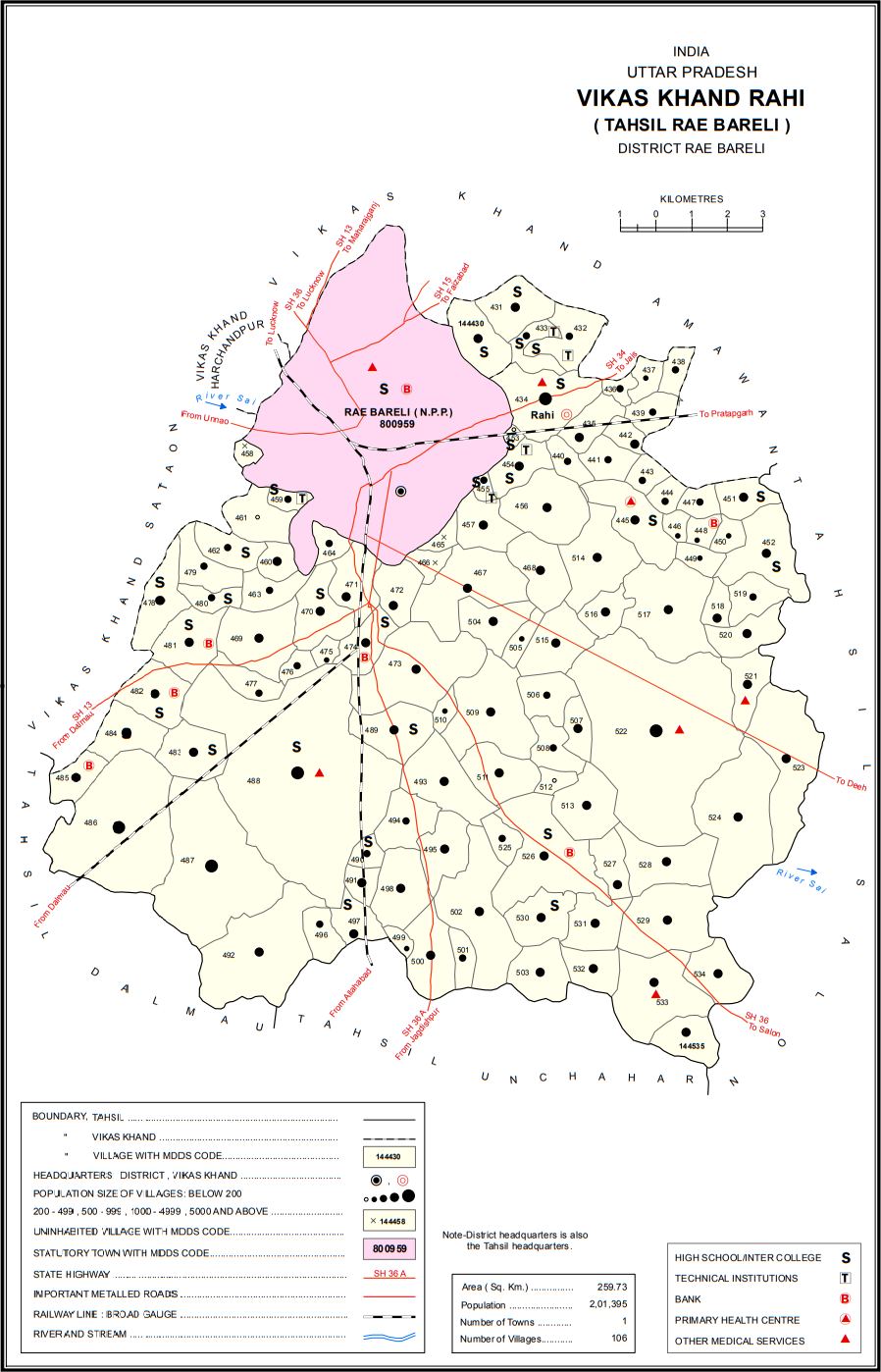
- Map showing Paintemau (#443) in Rahi CD block

- Location in Uttar Pradesh, India
- Coordinates: 26.218944°N 81.324974°E
- Country: India
- State: Uttar Pradesh
- District: Raebareli

Area
  - Total: 0.637 km^{2} (0.246 sq mi)

Population (2011)
  - Total: 617
  - Density: 969/km^{2} (2,510/sq mi)

Languages
  - Official: Hindi
- Time zone: UTC+5:30 (IST)
- Vehicle registration: UP-35

Paintemau is a village in Rahi block of Rae Bareli district, Uttar Pradesh, India. It is located 6 km from Rae Bareli, the district headquarters. As of 2011, its population comprises 617 people, in 112 households. The village has one primary school and no medical facilities and it does not host a weekly haat or a permanent market. It belongs to the nyaya panchayat of Rustampur.

The 1951 census recorded Paintemau as comprising 2 hamlets, with a total population of 233 people (119 male and 114 female), in 53 households and 51 physical houses. The area of the village was given as 155 acres. 14 residents were literate, all male. The village was listed as belonging to the pargana of Rae Bareli North and the thana of Kotwali.

The 1961 census recorded Paintemau as comprising 1 hamlet, with a total population of 248 people (125 male and 123 female), in 57 households and 50 physical houses. The area of the village was given as 155 acres.

The 1981 census recorded Paintemau (as "Paitemau") as having a population of 319 people, in 62 households, and having an area of 62.73 hectares. The main staple foods were listed as wheat and rice.

The 1991 census recorded Paintemau (as "Painte Mau") as having a total population of 414 people (219 male and 195 female), in 76 households and 69 physical houses. The area of the village was listed as 63 hectares. Members of the 0-6 age group numbered 81, or 19.5% of the total; this group was 49% male (40) and 51% female (41). Members of scheduled castes numbered 88, or 21% of the village's total population, while no members of scheduled tribes were recorded. The literacy rate of the village was 29% (91 men and 29 women). 165 people were classified as main workers (110 men and 55 women), while 4 people were classified as marginal workers (2 men and 2 women); the remaining 245 residents were non-workers. The breakdown of main workers by employment category was as follows: 80 cultivators (i.e. people who owned or leased their own land); 51 agricultural labourers (i.e. people who worked someone else's land in return for payment); 1 worker in livestock, forestry, fishing, hunting, plantations, orchards, etc.; 0 in mining and quarrying; 0 household industry workers; 11 workers employed in other manufacturing, processing, service, and repair roles; 7 construction workers; 6 employed in trade and commerce; 3 employed in transport, storage, and communications; and 6 in other services.
