= Sultanpur Aima =

Sultanpur Aima Sultānpur Aima
- Village
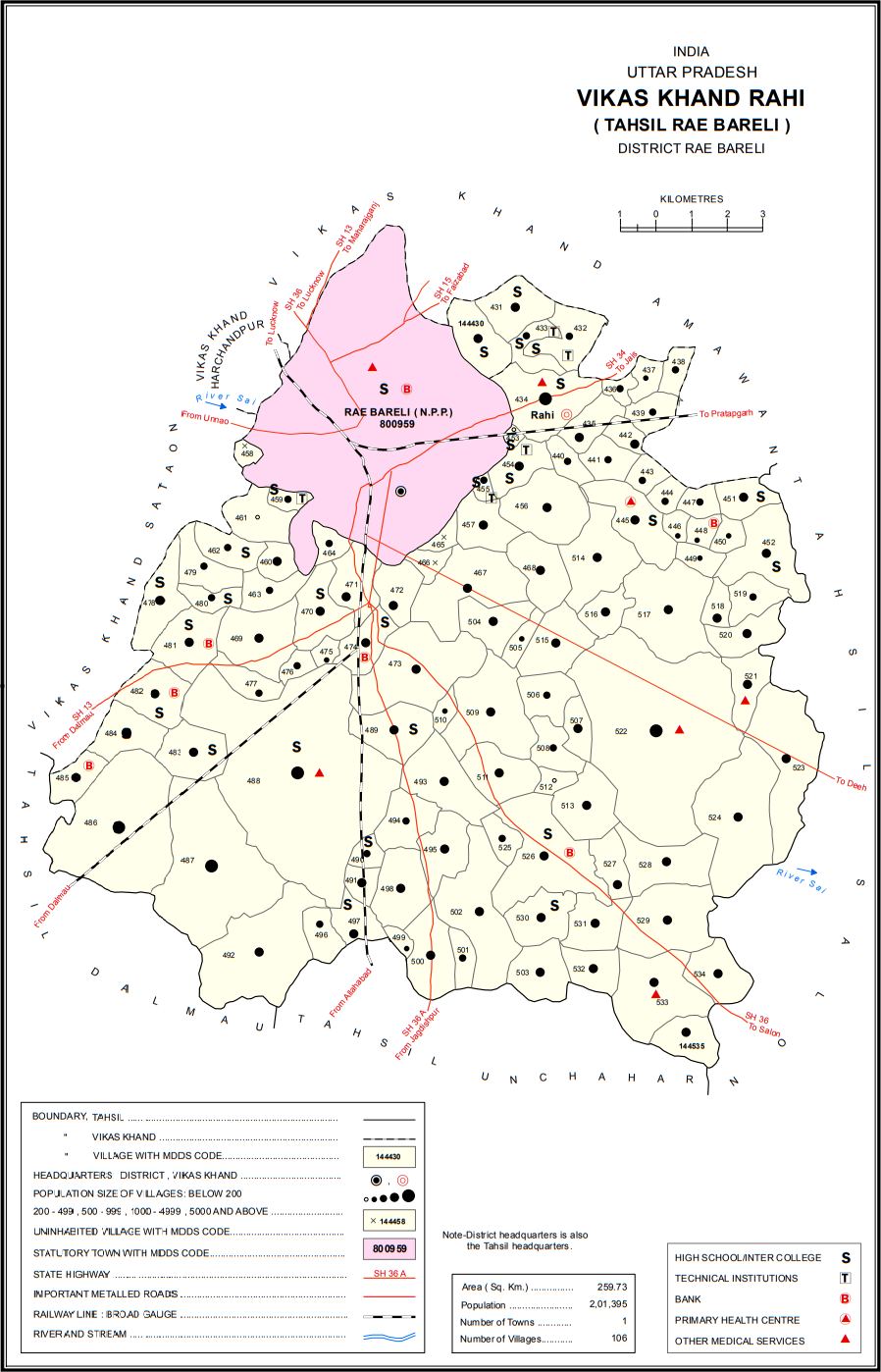
- Map showing Sultanpur Aima (#475) in Rahi CD block

- Location in Uttar Pradesh, India
- Coordinates: 26.172038°N 81.234163°E
- Country India: India
- State: Uttar Pradesh
- District: Raebareli

Area
  - Total: 0.586 km^{2} (0.226 sq mi)

Population (2011)
  - Total: 448
  - Density: 765/km^{2} (1,980/sq mi)

Languages
  - Official: Hindi
- Time zone: UTC+5:30 (IST)
- Vehicle registration: UP-35

Sultanpur Aima is a village in Rahi block of Rae Bareli district, Uttar Pradesh, India. It is located 5 km from Rae Bareli, the district headquarters. As of 2011, it has a population of 448 people, in 78 households. It has one primary school and no healthcare facilities.

The 1961 census recorded Sultanpur Aima as comprising 2 hamlets, with a total population of 270 people (140 male and 130 female), in 50 households and 43 physical houses. The area of the village was given as 140 acres.

The 1981 census recorded Sultanpur Aima as having a population of 376 people, in 66 households, and having an area of 21.04 hectares. The main staple foods were given as wheat and rice.
