= Hardaspur, Raebareli =

Hardaspur (Estate) Hardaspur Hardāspur
- Village
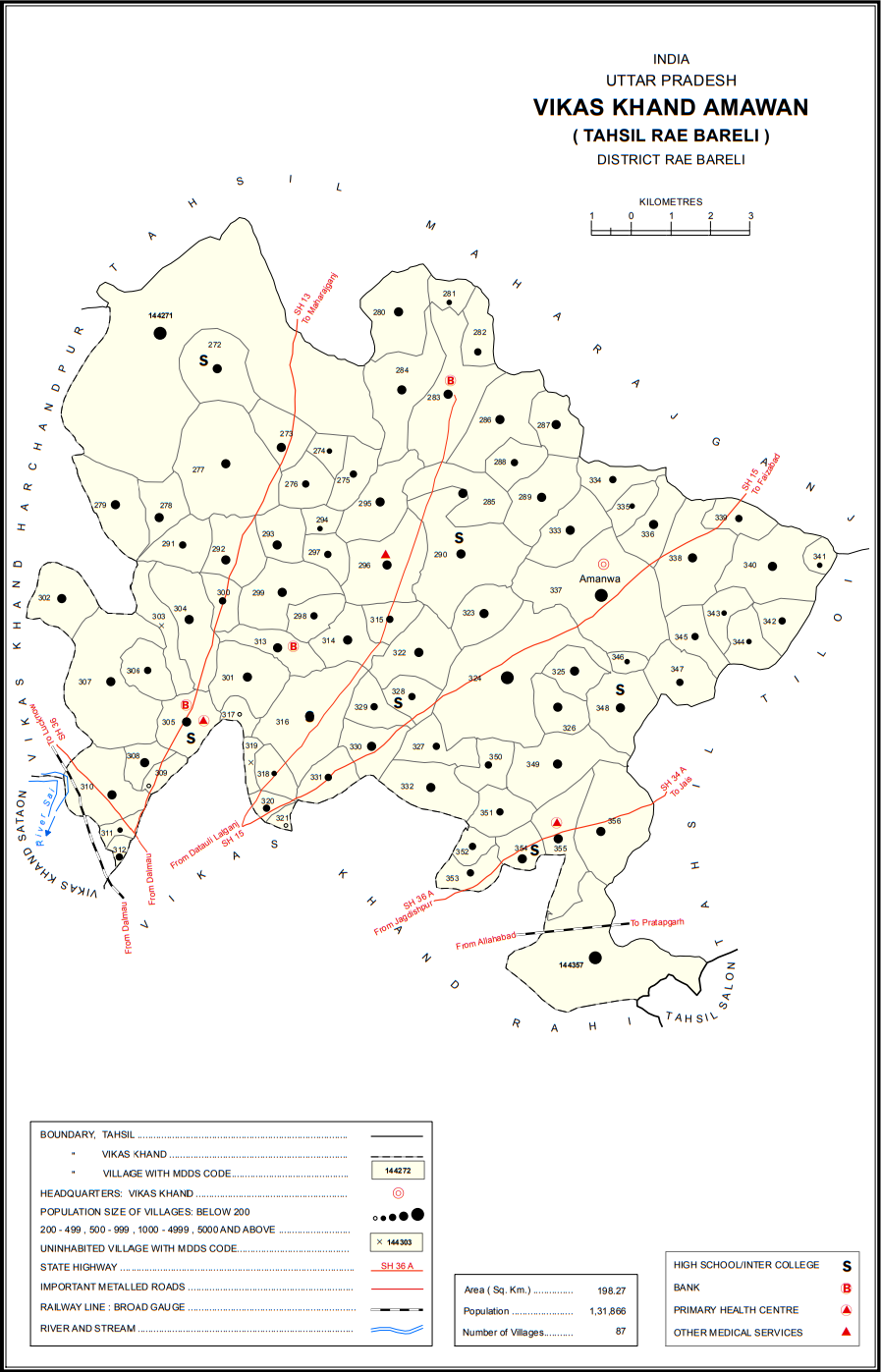
- Map showing Hardaspur (#305) in Amawan CD block

- Location in Uttar Pradesh, India
- Coordinates: 26.278634°N 81.2499°E
- Country India: India
- State: Uttar Pradesh
- District: Raebareli
- Founder: Har Das Rai & Baij Nath Rai Hardaspur & Ganga Prasad Srivastava (Gangaganj)

Area
  - Total: 2.394 km^{2} (0.924 sq mi)

Population (2011)
  - Total: 2,974
  - Density: 1,242/km^{2} (3,217/sq mi)

Languages
  - Official: Hindi
- Time zone: UTC+5:30 (IST)
- Vehicle registration: UP-33

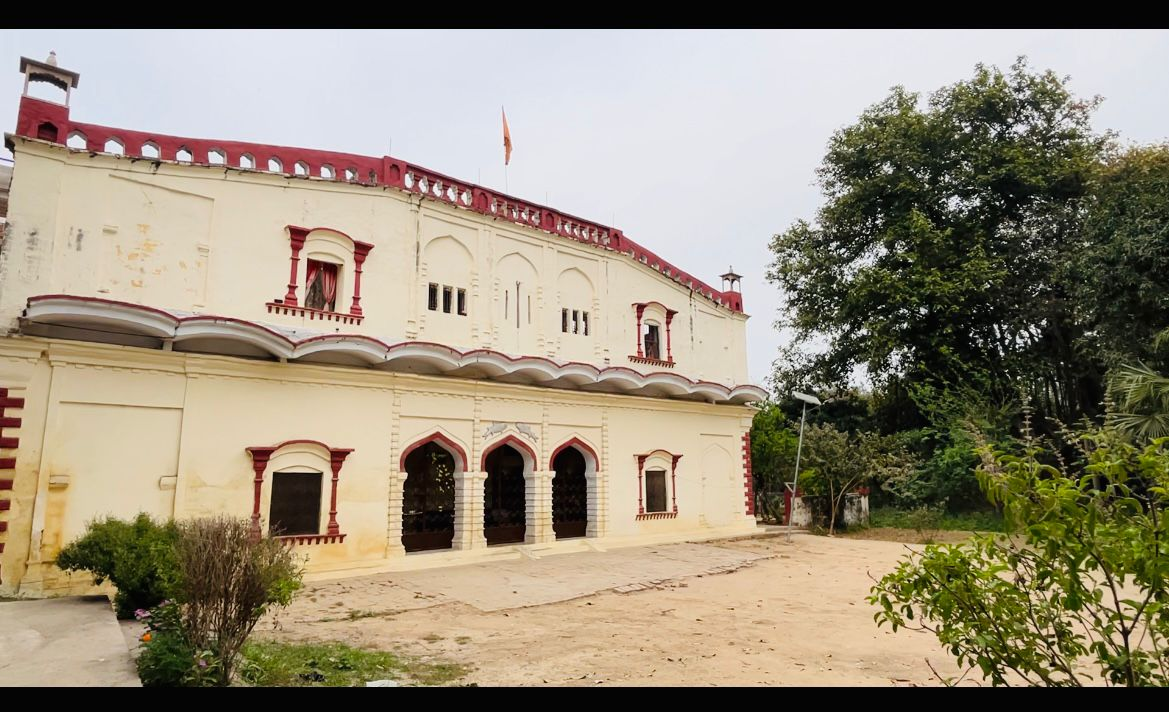

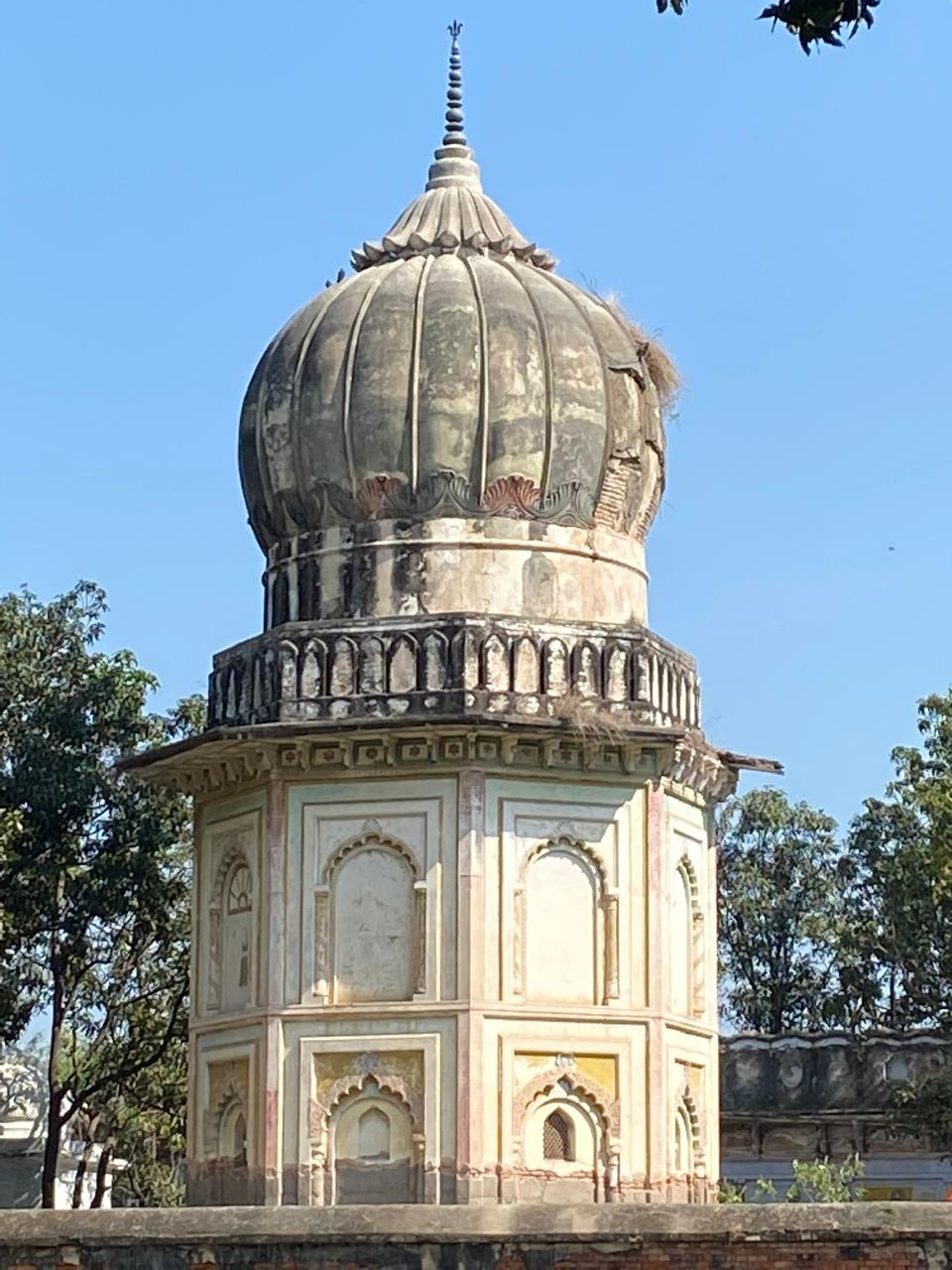

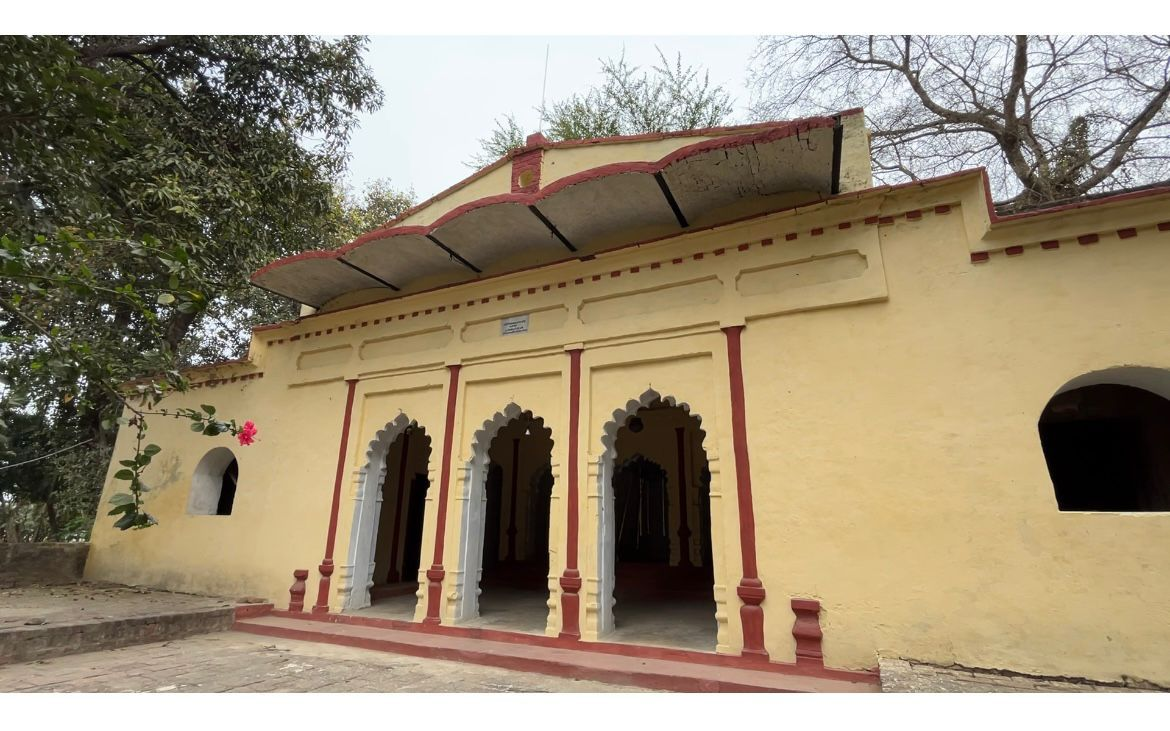

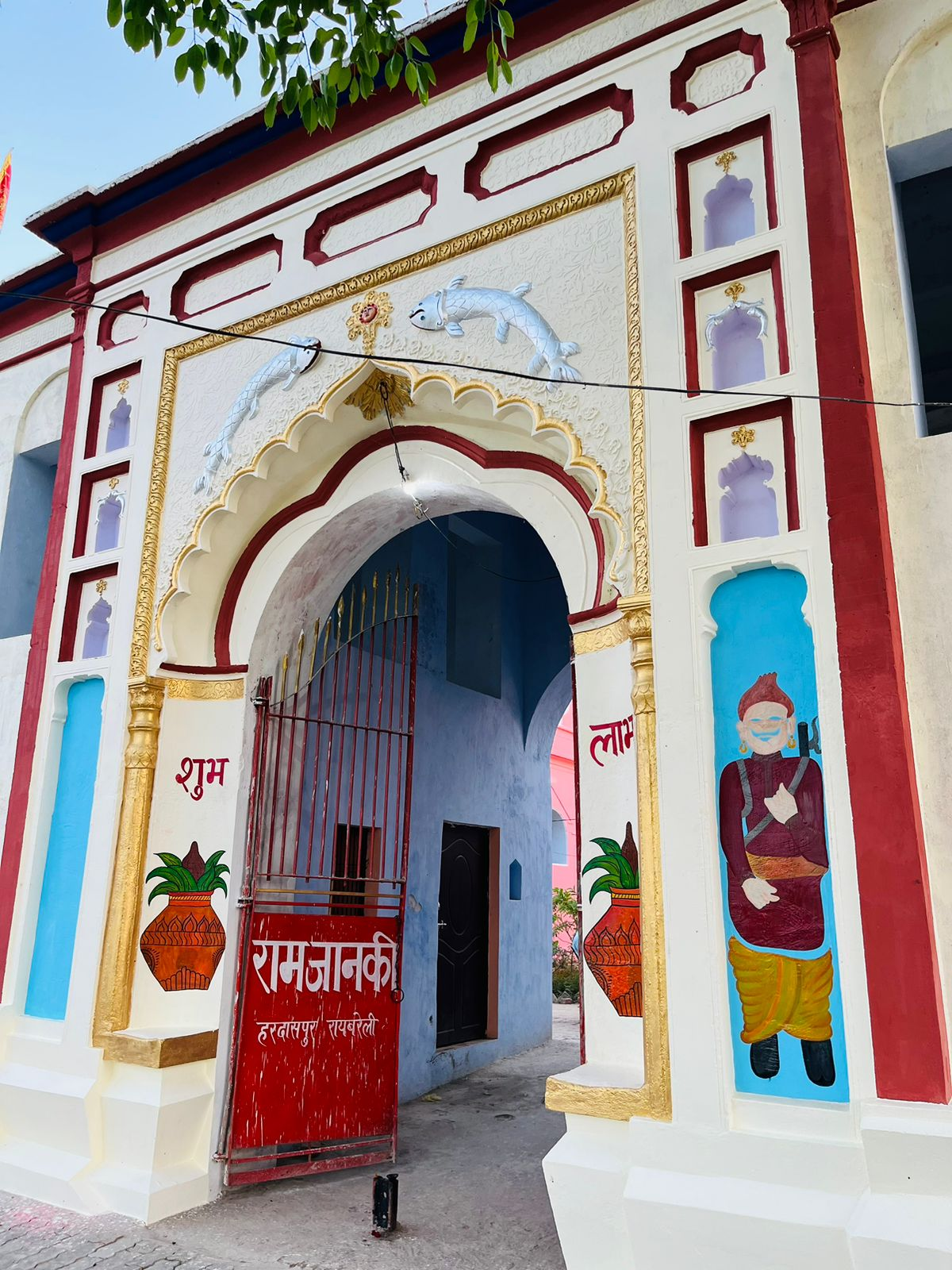

Hardaspur is a village in Amawan block of Rae Bareli district, Uttar Pradesh, India. As of 2011, its population is 2,974, in 570 households. It has 3 primary schools and one small clinic.

Hardaspur was historically the seat of a taluqdari estate held by a Kayasth family who had a close association with the Bais rajas of Daundia Khera. They claimed descent from one Ram Lal, who was supposedly the Diwan to the first Bais ruler, Abhai Chand, and several of his descendants held the same office for later Bais rajas. One of them, Nabh Chand, is said to have been adopted by the Bais raja Tilok Chand, and so his descendants were styled Thakur. One of them, Har Das, founded the village of Hardaspur around the time of Akbar; his brother Rath Rai was made qanunqo of the pargana of Rae Bareli.

The Kayasth taluqdars of Hardaspur never gained a large territory because they were surrounded by Rajput taluqdars and often in conflict with their Muslim neighbours. In the 1800s, the taluqdar Baij Nath obtained the sanad for the Hardaspur estate, which comprised 15 villages and it was succeeded by his son Gauri Shanker and Gauri Shanker had one son whose name was Umed Rai who was married to Rani Jugraj Kunwari. At the turn of the 20th century, the Hardaspur estate was held by Rani Jugraj Kunwari, who was the widow of Baij Nath's grandson Umed Rai; by then it only consisted of 9 villages in the pargana of Rae Bareli. Rani Jugraj Kunwari and Umed Rai had only one Daughter whose name was Rani Parag Kunwari who was married to Babu Ganga Prasad Alias Kunwar Gangesh and they had one daughter whose name was Rani Teerath Kunwari and after the Death of Rani Jugraj Kunwari the estate Hardaspur was held by Babu Ganga Prasad Alias Kunwar Gangesh who was the son in law of Rani Jugraj Kunwari and then during the reign Babu Ganga Prasad established one new place that is Gangaganj. Then after a few years of rule, Rani Parag Kunwari died, Few years after Rani Parag Kunwari's Death, Then Babu Ganga Prasad Alias Kunwar Gangesh was married to Rani Kamlapati Kunwari Who was the Grand Daughter of Babu Hanuman Prasad and Daughter of Babu Alakh Prasad District Raebareli, Rani Kamlapati Kunwari had no child of her own, so she Adopted her real nephew as her own child who lived with her and his name was Babu Bindra Prasad Srivastava, who was the sole successor of Babu Ganga Prasad Alias Kunwar Gangesh.

The present Representative name of Hardaspur Taluqdari family is Dr.Badrinath Srivastava, Shri Girish Chandra Srivastava, Shri Brijesh Kumar Srivastava, at Hardaspur Kothi Gangaganj Raebareli.

The 1961 census recorded Hardaspur as comprising 3 hamlets, with a total population of 1,141 people (579 male and 562 female), in 250 households and 231 physical houses. The area of the village was given as 582 acres.

The 1981 census recorded Hardaspur as having a population of 1,692 people, in 304 households, and having an area of 239.58 hectares. The main staple foods were given as wheat and rice.
