= Amawan =

Amawan Amāwān
- Village
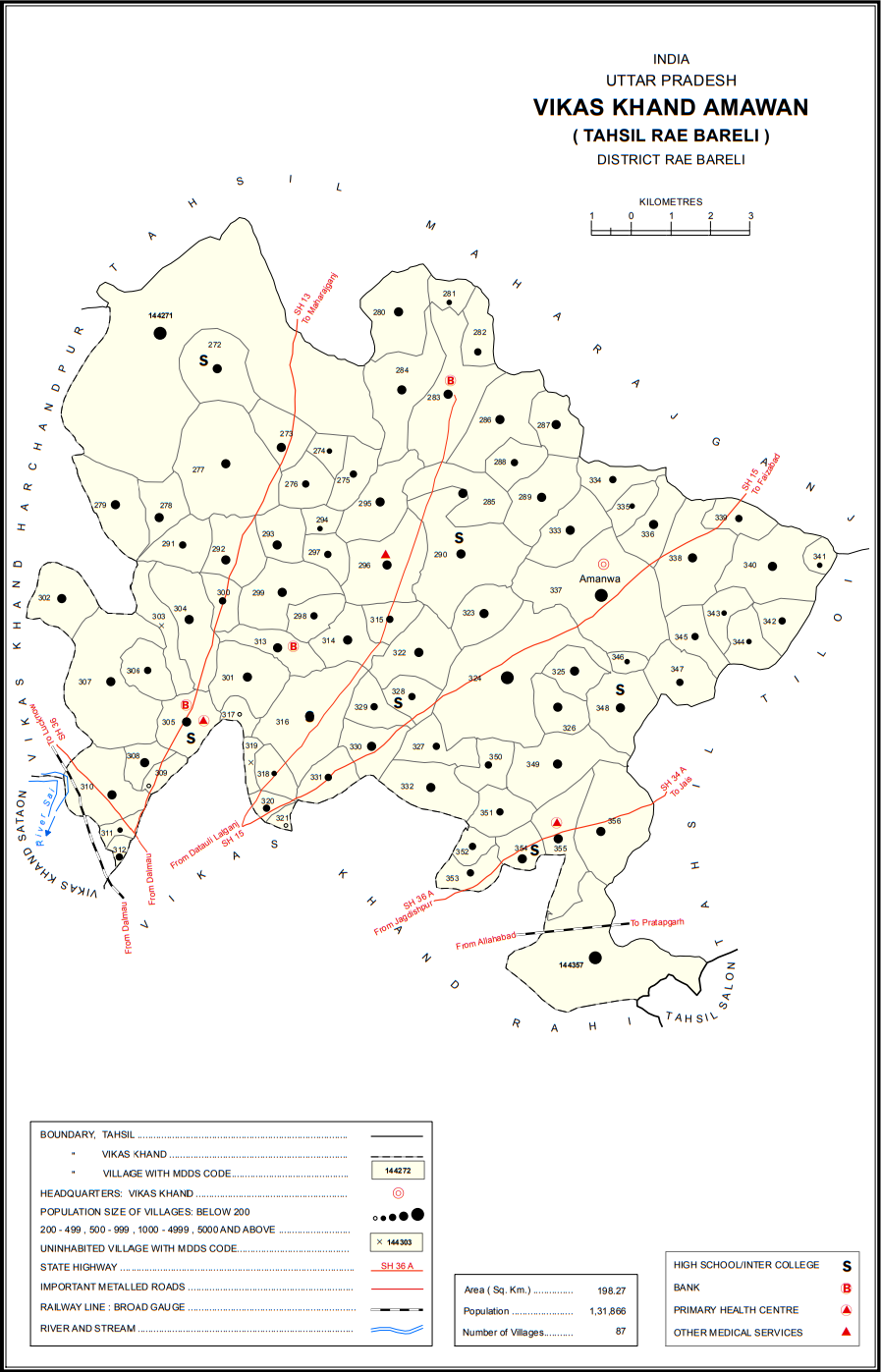
- Map of Amawan CD block

- Location in Uttar Pradesh, India
- Coordinates: 26.312476°N 81.348951°E
- Country India: India
- State: Uttar Pradesh
- District: Raebareli

Area
  - Total: 5.838 km^{2} (2.254 sq mi)

Population (2011)
  - Total: 5,245
  - Density: 898.4/km^{2} (2,327/sq mi)

Languages
  - Official: Hindi
- Time zone: UTC+5:30 (IST)
- Vehicle registration: UP-35

Amawan is a village and corresponding community development block in Rae Bareli district, Uttar Pradesh, India. It historically was the seat of a taluqdari estate held by a Pathan family and eventually split into two shares. As of 2011, its population is 5,245, in 973 households. It has five primary schools and no healthcare facilities.

== History ==
The taluqdars of Amawan claimed descent from Bhikham Khan, a Niyazi Pathan general in the army of Shihab-ud-Din Ghori who obtained a grant of land in the pargana of Salon along with the hereditary title of Diwan. His descendant Ibrahim Khan later gained control of Amawan. Much later, the brothers Qadirdad Khan and Sher Zaman Khan divided their territories into two adjoining estates: Qadirdad Khan received the Pahremau estate, and Sher Zaman Khan received the Amawan estate. Sher Zaman Khan's son and successor, Allahdad Khan, had his property seized by one Rana Beni Madho Bakhsh, but he was able to recover it with the aid of the chakladar. He then was faced with the Kanhpurias seizing part of his lands, and he later made a settlement with Raja Jagpal Singh of Tiloi. Since Allahdad Khan had no sons, the sanad for the Amawan estate went to the husbands of his two daughters after he died. The Amawan estate was then split into two shares, but both shareholders fell heavily into debt and had to sell off or mortgage their lands by the turn of the 20th century.

The 1961 census recorded Amawan as comprising 22 hamlets, with a total population of 1,881 people (942 male and 939 female), in 399 households and 301 physical houses. The area of the village was given as 1,477 acres.

The 1981 census recorded Amawan as having a population of 2,647 people, in 574 households, and having an area of 590.46 hectares. The main staple foods were given as wheat and rice.

== Villages ==
Amawan CD block has the following 87 villages:

Village name	Total land area (hectares)	Population (in 2011)
Bawan Buzurg Valla	2,330.4	11,754
Saripur	252	1,525
Sobhi	182.4	1,804
Jaraila	88.5	490
Baghai Ahalwar	150.3	866
Khaira	112.3	851
Bhulwansa	535	3,772
Gauhanna	183.5	1,091
Hilgi	119.7	1,106
Pahrawan	285.9	1,431
Basalat Nagar	75.9	373
Ashrafabad	130.2	896
Pahremau	395.2	3,165
Oya	276.7	1,635
Baghail	238.7	1,393
Khairhana	461.4	1,953
Bahadur Nagar	166.5	1,140
Mohabbat Nagar	117	707
Baikhara	277.4	1,737
Pindari Kalan	569.6	3,960
Bibipur Taluke Hasnapur	176	978
Lodhwa Mau	181	1,939
Paharpur Mardanpur	150.3	1,390
Turava Nagar	74.4	266
Onaiy Jangal	265.2	1,373
Jetuva Tappe Bijhwan	310	2,511
Dedauwa	97.9	810
Jalalpur	93.2	744
Mardanpur	28	1,927
Jamalpur Karaundi	104	630
Parigawan	251.3	1,668
Chaupura	182	1,107
Alladadpur	157	0
Kachaunda Nanakari	275	1,485
Hardaspur	239.4	2,974
Chak Loharahar	121.6	762
Sarawan	539.5	2,159
Garhi Khas	80.9	1,644
Rampur	106.9	22
Didauli	342.3	1,709
Gokulpur	29	228
Kishunpur Ramchandra	171	692
Adampur	151.4	1,779
Lalpur Chauhan	155	1,051
Bhuwapur Kalan	141.7	780
Kondaras Buzurg	428.8	3,143
Bhuwapur Junardar	87.3	148
Kondras Khurd	78.7	296
Khaura	168.3	0
Ufara Mau	71.4	517
Khaspari	92.4	1
Rasehta	231.6	2,756
Pindari Khurd	219.4	1,615
Sidhauna	777.1	5,352
Tajpur	132.9	1,227
Marauiya Andawan	136.3	1,234
Umarpur Gerukhuwa	113.8	685
Chakpeera Shah	100.4	819
Manchitpur	116.7	887
Budhanpur	169	1,240
Chakdadar	121.6	653
Mainoopur	257.7	2,193
Rukunpur	198.6	1,168
Kutubpur Varenda	166.5	846
Muzaffarpur	90.5	453
Dusauti	180.6	1,562
Amanwa (block headquarters)	583.8	5,245
Dhooradeeh	371.6	2,561
Mohammadpur Churai	113.8	831
Samarhada	329.4	2,359
Pure Nakki	39.2	418
Rasulpur	106.4	514
Bibipur Taluke Amawan	101.7	406
Chandpur	109.3	314
Makhdumpur	142.7	853
Chak Khapar	132.9	404
Pandrae	153.6	879
Hariyawan	222.3	1,484
Sandi Ram	307.2	2,435
Rajwapur	120.4	707
Bandipur	144	931
Kauwadeeh	57.3	511
Haivat Mau	100.6	854
Dighiya	75.6	1,695
Sandi Nagin	163.6	1,234
Daut Nagar	323.9	2,061
Roopa Mau	815.3	6,098
