= Mardanpur, Raebareli =

Mardanpur Mardānpur
- Village
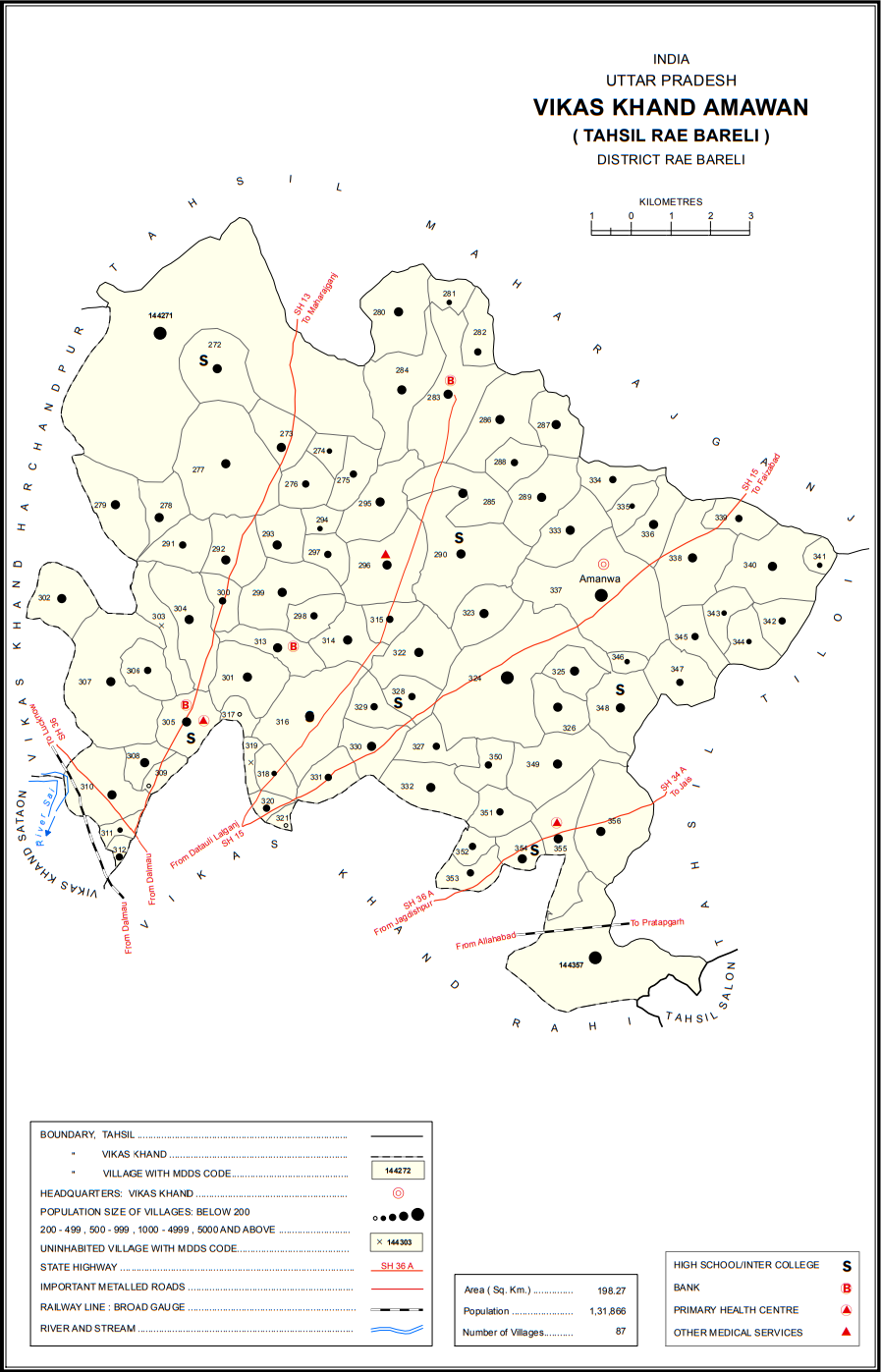
- Map showing Mardanpur (#299) in Amawan CD block

- Location in Uttar Pradesh, India
- Coordinates: 26.306245°N 81.270254°E
- Country India: India
- State: Uttar Pradesh
- District: Raebareli

Area
  - Total: 0.28 km^{2} (0.11 sq mi)

Population (2011)
  - Total: 1,927
  - Density: 6,900/km^{2} (18,000/sq mi)

Languages
  - Official: Hindi
- Time zone: UTC+5:30 (IST)
- Vehicle registration: UP-35

Mardanpur is a village in Amawan block of Rae Bareli district, Uttar Pradesh, India. It is located 15 km from Raebareli, the district headquarters. As of 2011, its population is 1,927, in 333 households. It has one primary school and no healthcare facilities.

The 1961 census recorded Mardanpur (as "Mardapur") as comprising 7 hamlets, with a total population of 808 people (435 male and 373 female), in 118 households and 104 physical houses. The area of the village was given as 729 acres.

The 1981 census recorded Mardanpur (again as "Mardapur") as having a population of 1,256 people, in 203 households, and having an area of 276.41 hectares. The main staple foods were listed as wheat and rice.
