= Gokulpur, Raebareli =

Gokulpur
- Village
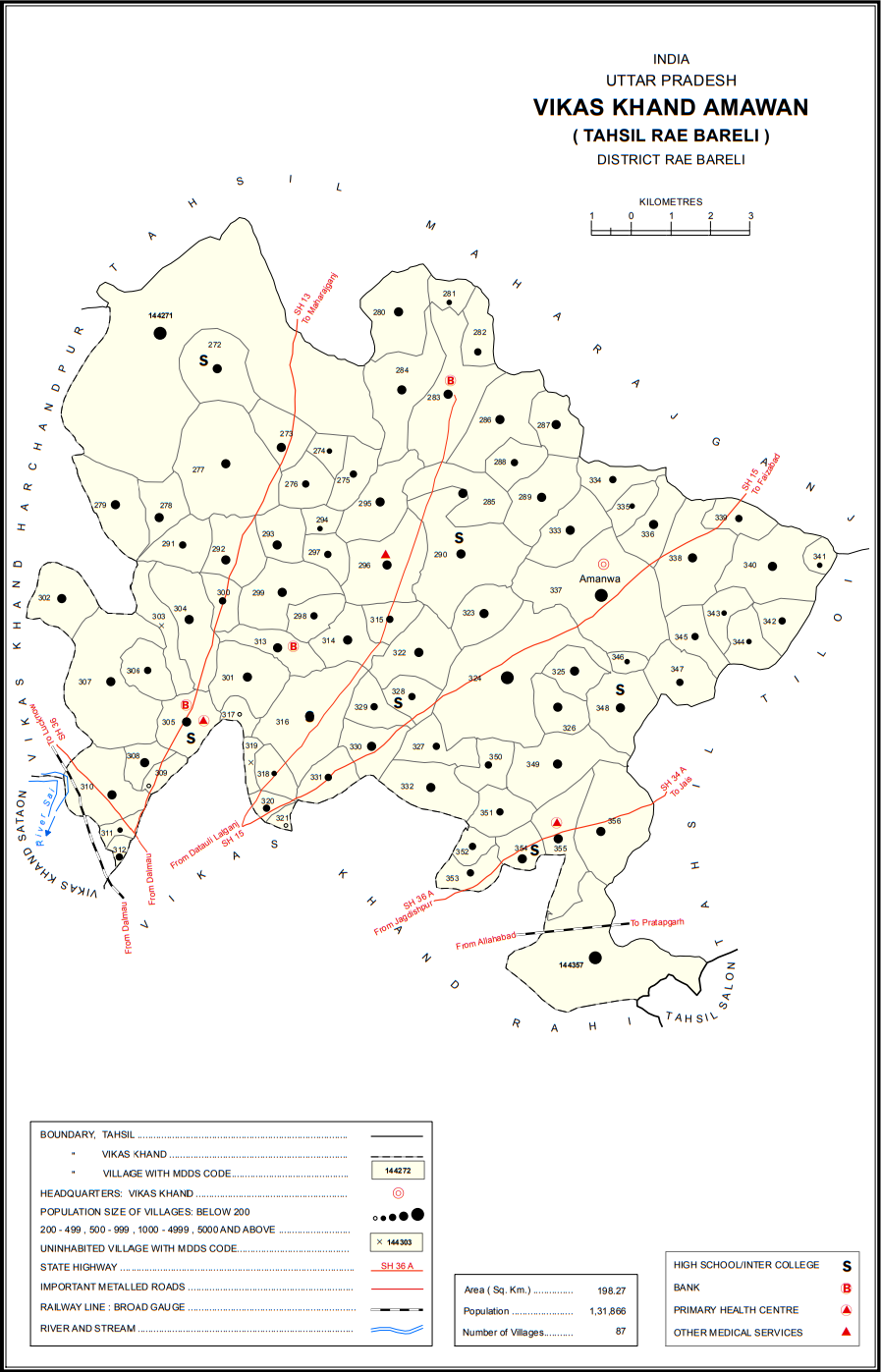
- Map showing Gokulpur (#311) in Amawan CD block

- Location in Uttar Pradesh, India
- Coordinates: 26.260451°N 81.234015°E
- Country India: India
- State: Uttar Pradesh
- District: Raebareli

Area
  - Total: 0.29 km^{2} (0.11 sq mi)

Population (2011)
  - Total: 228
  - Density: 790/km^{2} (2,000/sq mi)

Languages
  - Official: Hindi
- Time zone: UTC+5:30 (IST)
- Vehicle registration: UP-35

Gokulpur is a village in Amawan block of Rae Bareli district, Uttar Pradesh, India. As of 2011, its population is 228, in 41 households. It has no schools and no healthcare facilities.

The 1961 census recorded Gokulpur as comprising 1 hamlet, with a total population of 19 people (10 male and 9 female), in 3 households and 3 physical houses. The area of the village was given as 69 acres.

The 1981 census recorded Gokulpur as having a population of 48 people, in 9 households, and having an area of 28.73 hectares. The main staple foods were listed as wheat and rice.
