= Kondras Buzurg =

- Village
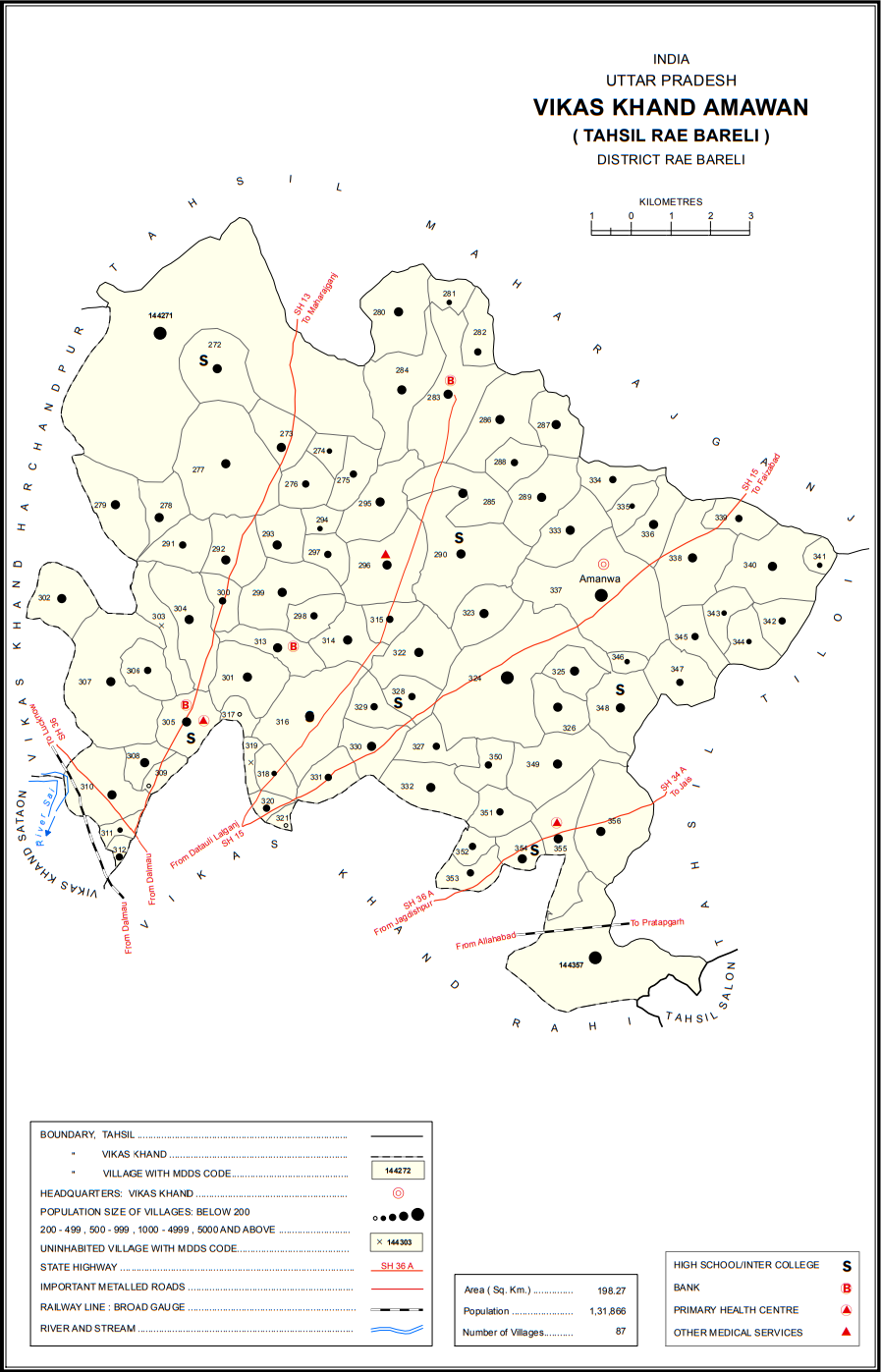
- Map showing Kondras Buzurg (#316) in Amawan CD block

- Location in Uttar Pradesh, India
- Coordinates: 26.281774°N 81.27895°E
- Country India: India
- State: Uttar Pradesh
- District: Raebareli

Area
  - Total: 428.8 km^{2} (165.6 sq mi)

Population (2011)
  - Total: 3,143
  - Density: 7.330/km^{2} (18.98/sq mi)

Languages
  - Official: Hindi
- Time zone: UTC+5:30 (IST)
- Vehicle registration: UP-35

Kondras Buzurg is a village in Amawan block of Rae Bareli district, Uttar Pradesh, India. It is located 9 km from Raebareli, the district headquarters. As of 2011, its population is 3,143, in 581 households. It has two primary schools and no healthcare facilities.

The 1961 census recorded Kondras Buzurg as comprising 11 hamlets, with a total population of 1,929 people (1,356 male and 573 female), in 274 households and 264 physical houses. The area of the village was given as 1,059 acres.

The 1981 census recorded Kondras Buzurg (as "Kundras Bujurg") as having a population of 1,876 people, in 340 households, and having an area of 426.96 hectares. The main staple foods were listed as wheat and rice.
