= Tajpur, Raebareli =

Tajpur Tājpur
- Village
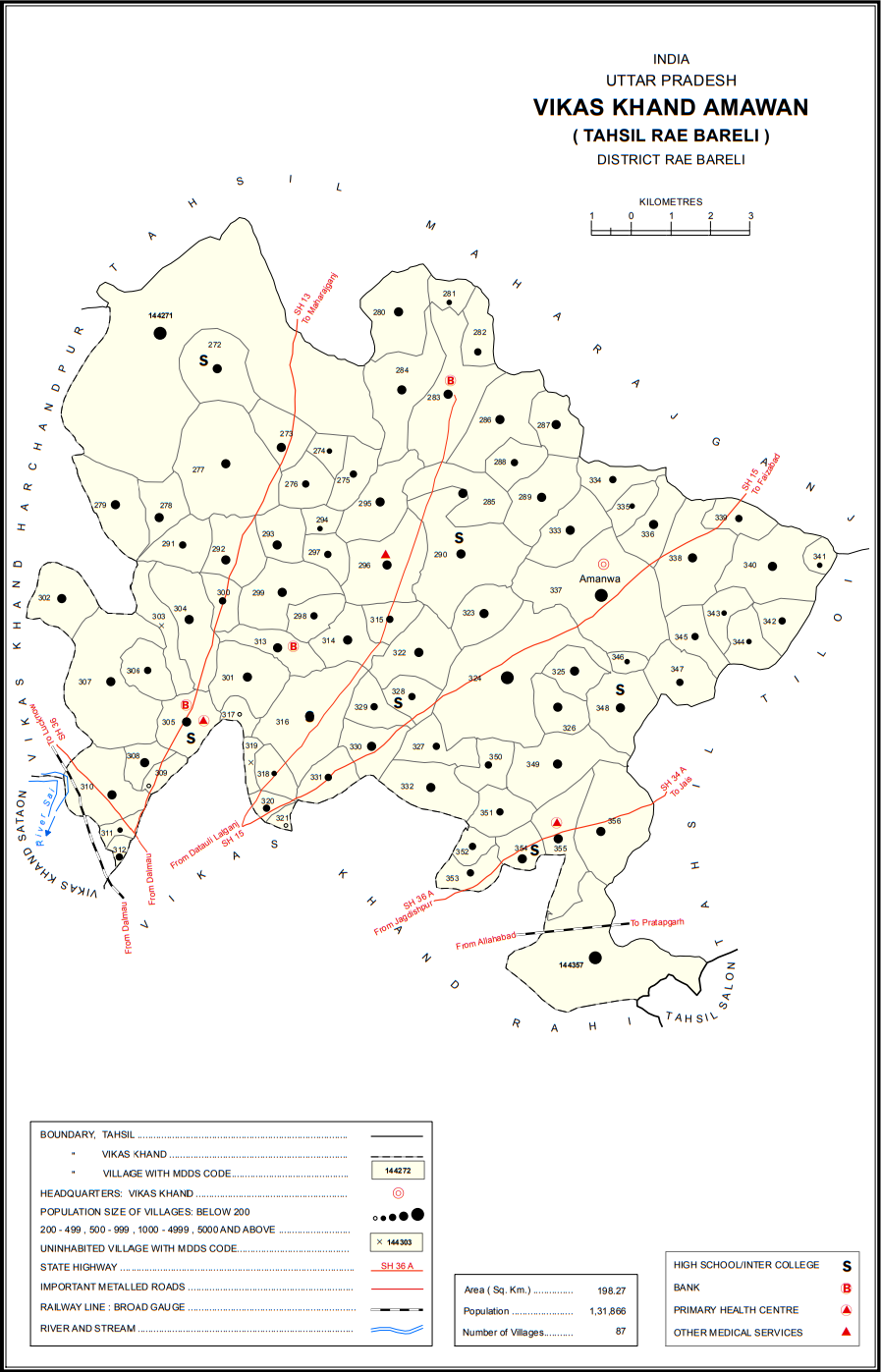
- Map showing Tajpur (#325) in Amawan CD block

- Location in Uttar Pradesh, India
- Coordinates: 26.292703°N 81.342502°E
- Country India: India
- State: Uttar Pradesh
- District: Raebareli

Area
  - Total: 1.329 km^{2} (0.513 sq mi)

Population (2011)
  - Total: 1,227
  - Density: 923.3/km^{2} (2,391/sq mi)

Languages
  - Official: Hindi
- Time zone: UTC+5:30 (IST)
- Vehicle registration: UP-35

Tajpur is a village in Amawan block of Rae Bareli district, Uttar Pradesh, India. It is located 15 km from Raebareli, the district headquarters. As of 2011, its population is 1,227, in 198 households. It has one primary school and no healthcare facilities.

The 1961 census recorded Tajpur as comprising 4 hamlets, with a total population of 569 people (340 male and 229 female), in 100 households and 97 physical houses. The area of the village was given as 312 acres.

The 1981 census recorded Tajpur as having a population of 620 people, in 117 households, and having an area of 144.88 hectares. The main staple foods were listed as wheat and rice.
