= Jalalpur, Amawan =

Jalalpur Jalālpur
- Village
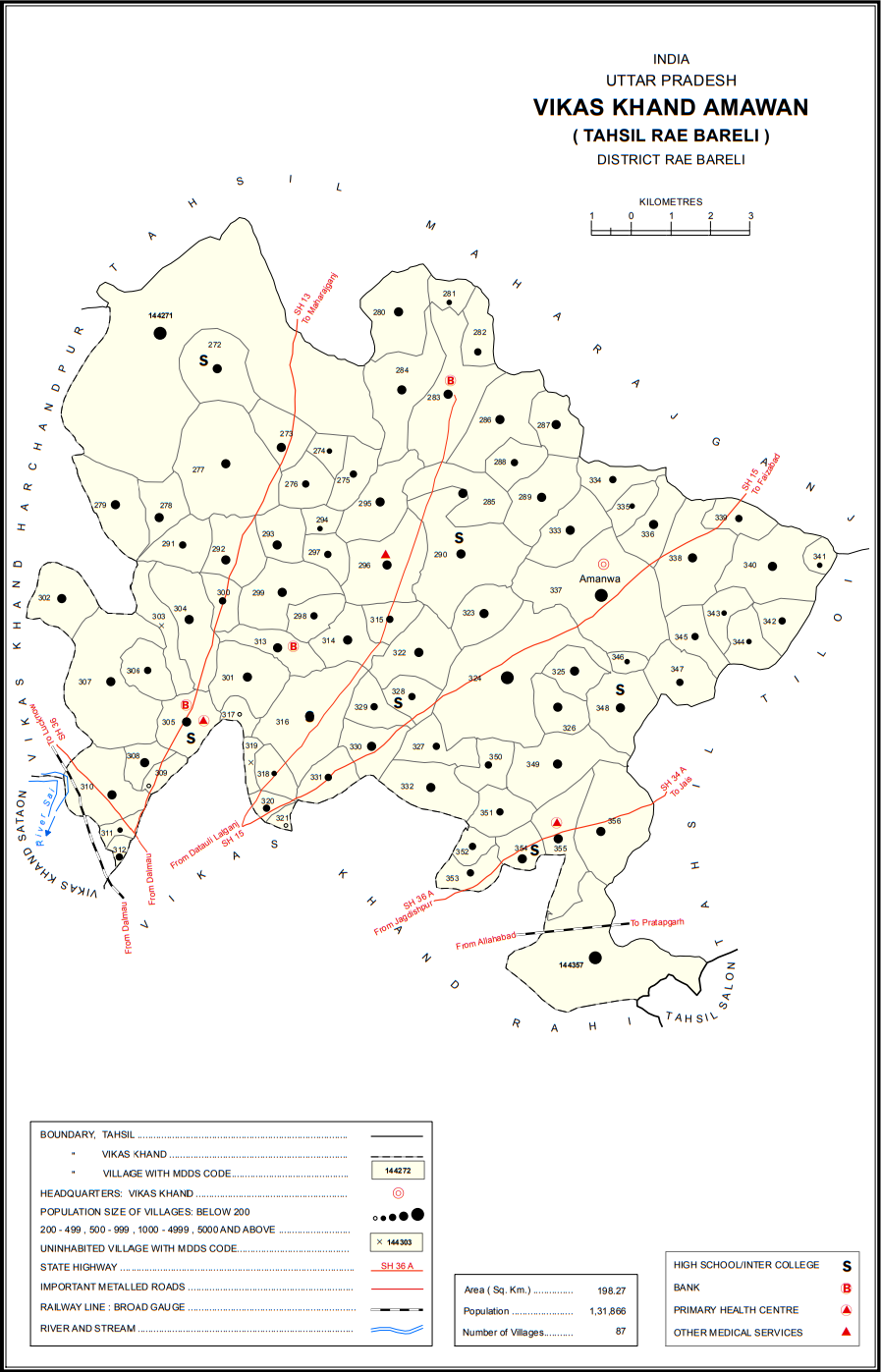
- Map showing Jalalpur (#298) in Amawan CD block

- Location in Uttar Pradesh, India
- Coordinates: 26.304802°N 81.275688°E
- Country India: India
- State: Uttar Pradesh
- District: Raebareli

Area
  - Total: 0.932 km^{2} (0.360 sq mi)

Population (2011)
  - Total: 744
  - Density: 798/km^{2} (2,070/sq mi)

Languages
  - Official: Hindi
- Time zone: UTC+5:30 (IST)
- Vehicle registration: UP-35

Jalalpur is a village in Amawan block of Rae Bareli district, Uttar Pradesh, India. It is located 15 km from Raebareli, the district headquarters. As of 2011, its population is 744, in 137 households. It has one primary school and no healthcare facilities.

The 1961 census recorded Jalalpur as comprising 3 hamlets, with a total population of 326 people (176 male and 150 female), in 73 households and 72 physical houses. The area of the village was given as 234 acres.

The 1981 census recorded Jalalpur as having a population of 516 people, in 100 households, and having an area of 94.30 hectares. The main staple foods were listed as wheat and rice.
