= Khaira, Raebareli =

Khaira
- Village
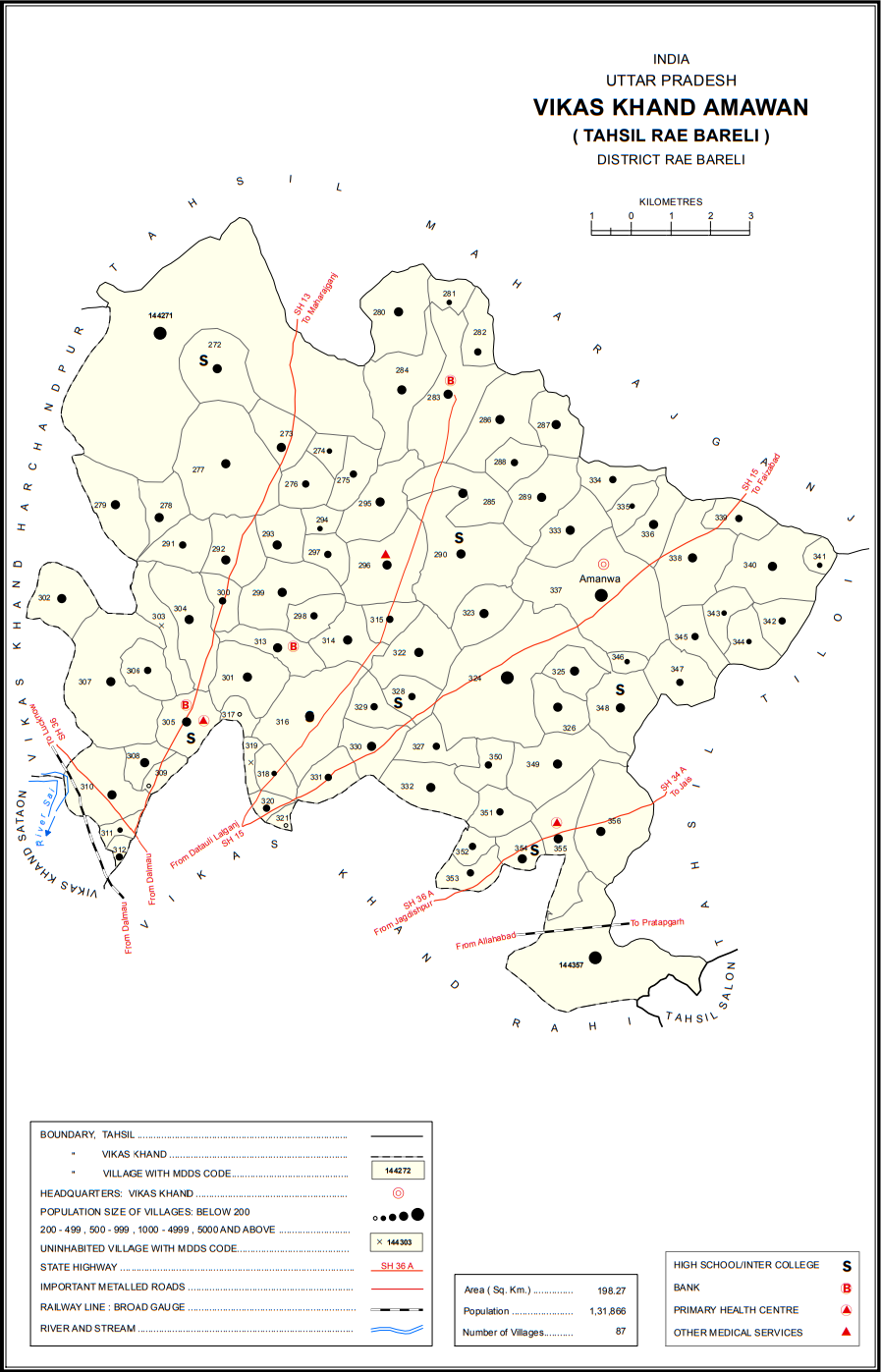
- Map showing Khaira (#276) in Amawan CD block

- Location in Uttar Pradesh, India
- Coordinates: 26.33618°N 81.27754°E
- Country India: India
- State: Uttar Pradesh
- District: Raebareli

Area
  - Total: 1.123 km^{2} (0.434 sq mi)

Population (2011)
  - Total: 851
  - Density: 758/km^{2} (1,960/sq mi)

Languages
  - Official: Hindi
- Time zone: UTC+5:30 (IST)
- Vehicle registration: UP-35

Khaira is a village in Amawan block of Rae Bareli district, Uttar Pradesh, India. It is located 18 km from Raebareli, the district headquarters. As of 2011, its population is 851, in 157 households. It has one primary school and no healthcare facilities.

The 1961 census recorded Khaira as comprising 4 hamlets, with a total population of 207 people (108 male and 99 female), in 38 households and 38 physical houses. The area of the village was given as 280 acres.

The 1981 census recorded Khaira as having a population of 375 people, in 35 households, and having an area of 107.65 hectares. The main staple foods were listed as wheat and rice. It had no amenities other than drinking water.
