= Dusauti =

- Village
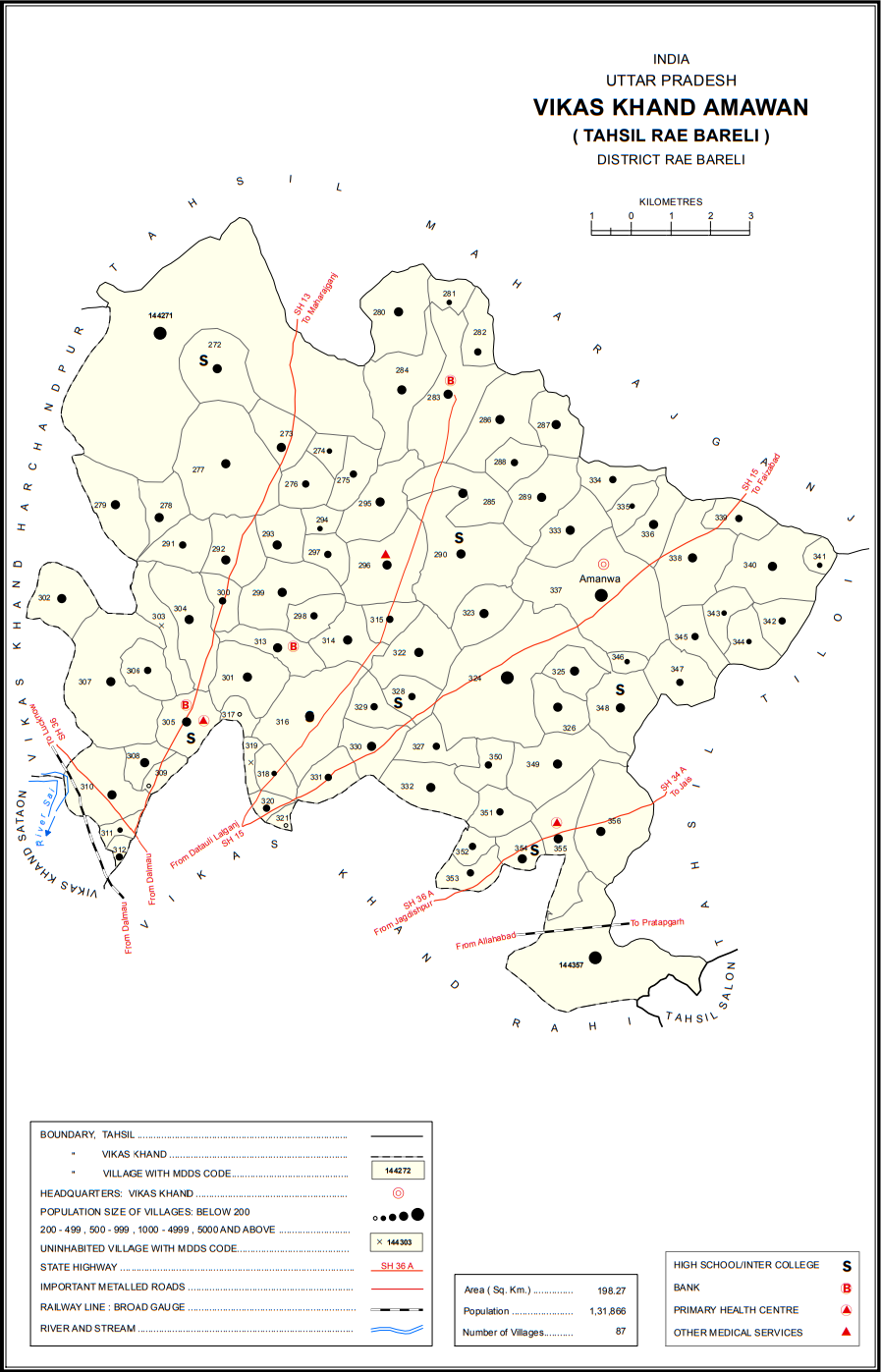
- Map showing Dusauti (#336) in Amawan CD block

- Location in Uttar Pradesh, India
- Coordinates: 26.321575°N 81.364079°E
- Country India: India
- State: Uttar Pradesh
- District: Raebareli

Area
  - Total: 1.806 km^{2} (0.697 sq mi)

Population (2011)
  - Total: 1,562
  - Density: 864.9/km^{2} (2,240/sq mi)

Languages
  - Official: Hindi
- Time zone: UTC+5:30 (IST)
- Vehicle registration: UP-33

Dusauti is a village in Amawan block of Rae Bareli district, Uttar Pradesh, India. As of 2011, its population is 1,562, in 233 households. It has one primary school and no healthcare facilities.

The 1961 census recorded Dusauti (as "Dosuti") as comprising 4 hamlets, with a total population of 632 people (316 male and 316 female), in 105 households and 96 physical houses. The area of the village was given as 463 acres.

The 1981 census recorded Dusauti as having a population of 848 people, in 150 households, and having an area of 357.35 hectares. The main staple foods were listed as wheat and rice.
