= Rasulpur, Amawan =

Rasulpur Rasūlpur
- Village
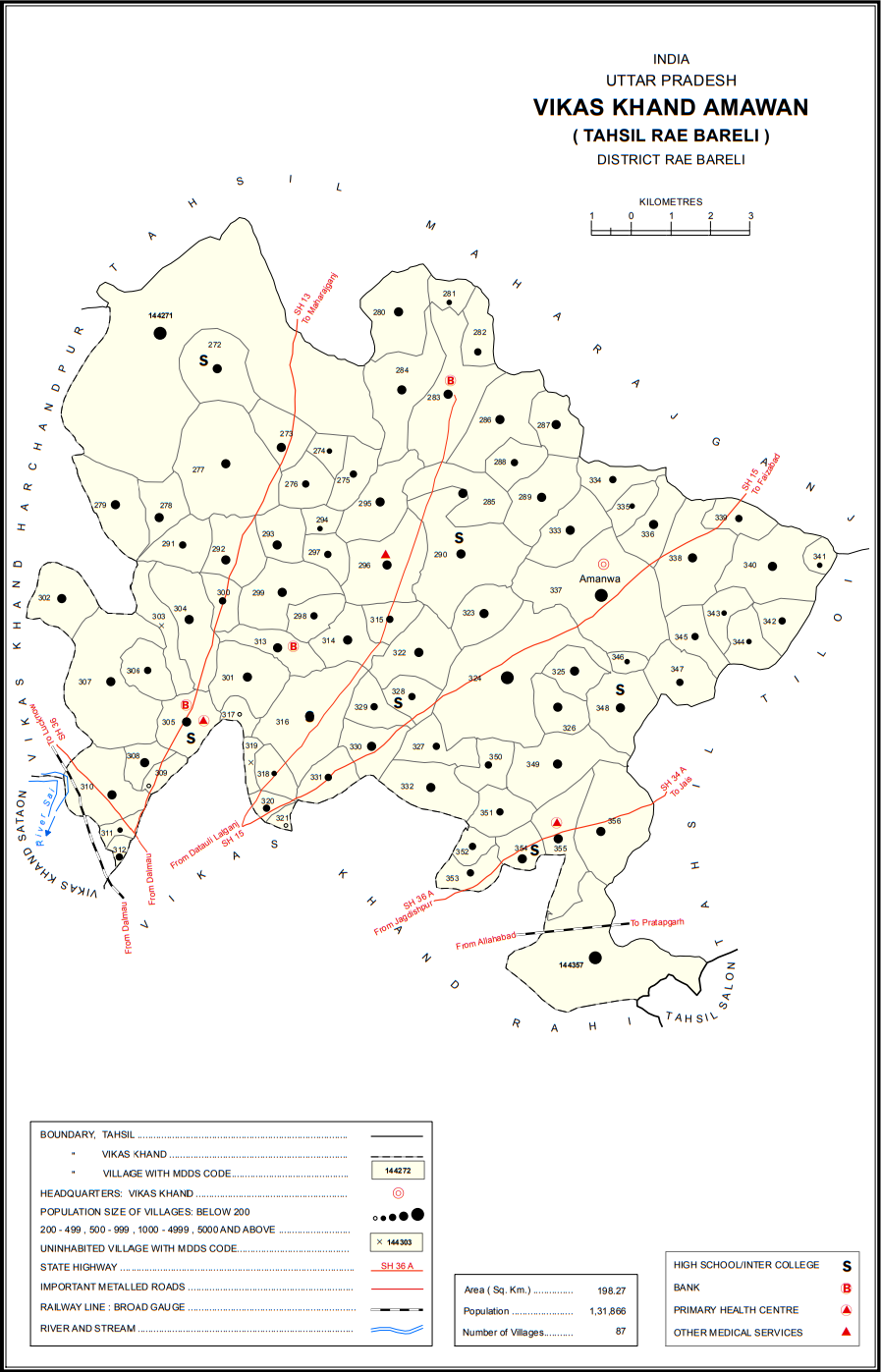
- Map showing Rasulpur (#342) in Amawan CD block

- Location in Uttar Pradesh, India
- Coordinates: 26.302879°N 81.392531°E
- Country India: India
- State: Uttar Pradesh
- District: Raebareli

Area
  - Total: 1.064 km^{2} (0.411 sq mi)

Population (2011)
  - Total: 514
  - Density: 483/km^{2} (1,250/sq mi)

Languages
  - Official: Hindi
- Time zone: UTC+5:30 (IST)
- Vehicle registration: UP-35

Rasulpur is a village in Amawan block of Rae Bareli district, Uttar Pradesh, India. It is located 29 km from Raebareli, the district headquarters. As of 2011, its population is 514, in 94 households.

The 1961 census recorded Rasulpur as comprising 4 hamlets, with a total population of 279 people (136 male and 143 female), in 63 households and 57 physical houses. The area of the village was given as 267 acres.

The 1981 census recorded Rasulpur as having a population of 379 people, in 61 households, and having an area of 106.44 hectares. The main staple foods were listed as wheat and rice.
