= Rasehta =

- Village
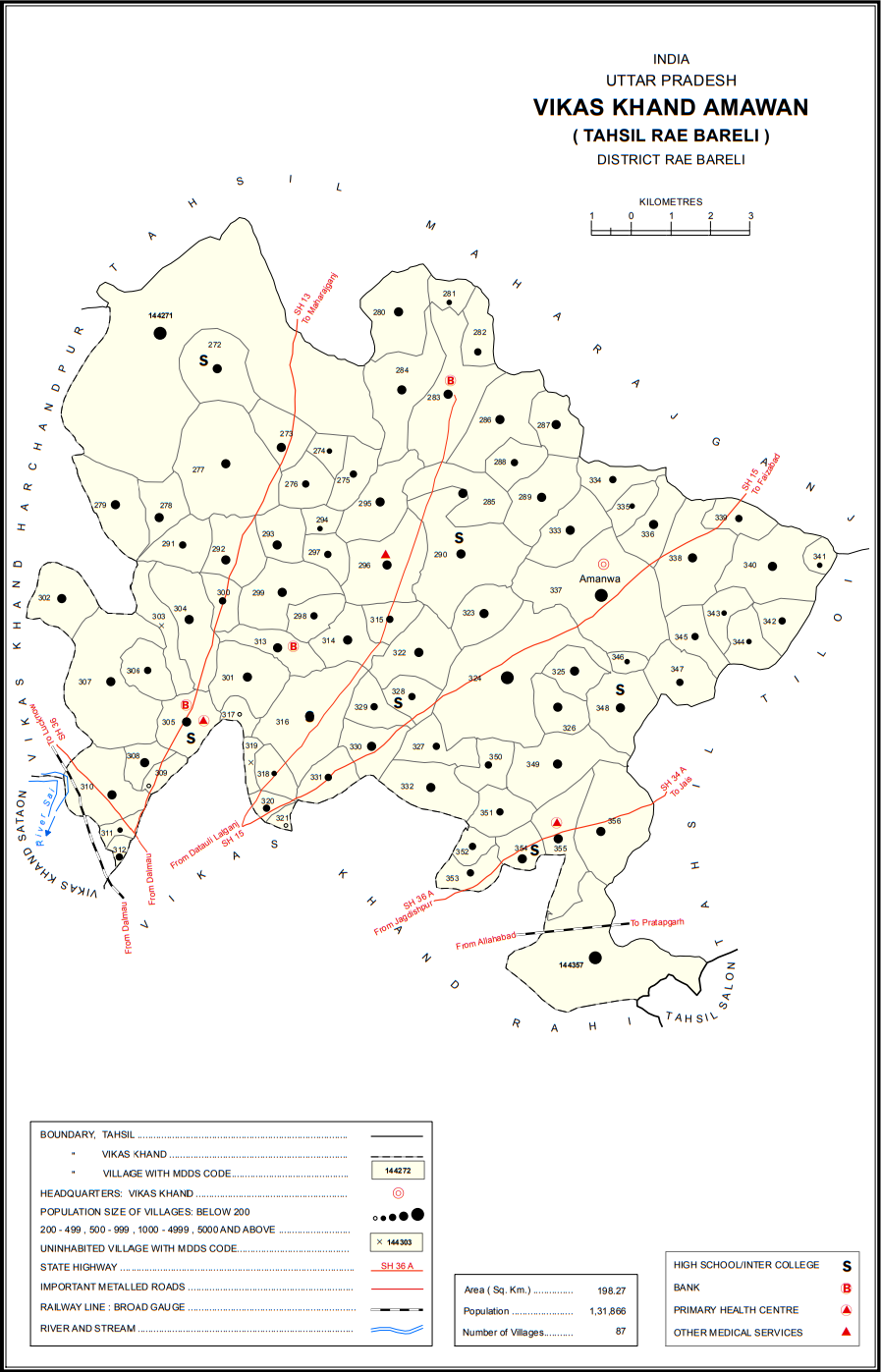
- Map showing Rasehta (#322) in Amawan CD block

- Location in Uttar Pradesh, India
- Coordinates: 26.295848°N 81.307842°E
- Country India: India
- State: Uttar Pradesh
- District: Raebareli

Area
  - Total: 2.316 km^{2} (0.894 sq mi)

Population (2011)
  - Total: 2,756
  - Density: 1,190/km^{2} (3,082/sq mi)

Languages
  - Official: Hindi
- Time zone: UTC+5:30 (IST)
- Vehicle registration: UP-33

Rasehta is a village in Amawan block of Rae Bareli district, Uttar Pradesh, India. It is located 14 km from Raebareli, the district headquarters. As of 2011, its population is 2,756, in 491 households. It has one primary school and no healthcare facilities.

The 1961 census recorded Rasehta as comprising 6 hamlets, with a total population of 1,422 people (711 male and 711 female), in 291 households and 291 physical houses. The area of the village was given as 610 acres.

The 1981 census recorded Rasehta as having a population of 1,753 people, in 319 households, and having an area of 235.54 hectares. The main staple foods were listed as wheat and rice

Historically Rasehta Comes under the Kayastha Talukdari seat of Hardaspur Estate Raebareli and ruled by Rani Jugraj Kunwari and Babu. Ganga Prasad Srivastava at Hardaspur Kothi Gangaganj Raebareli
