= Didauli =

- Village
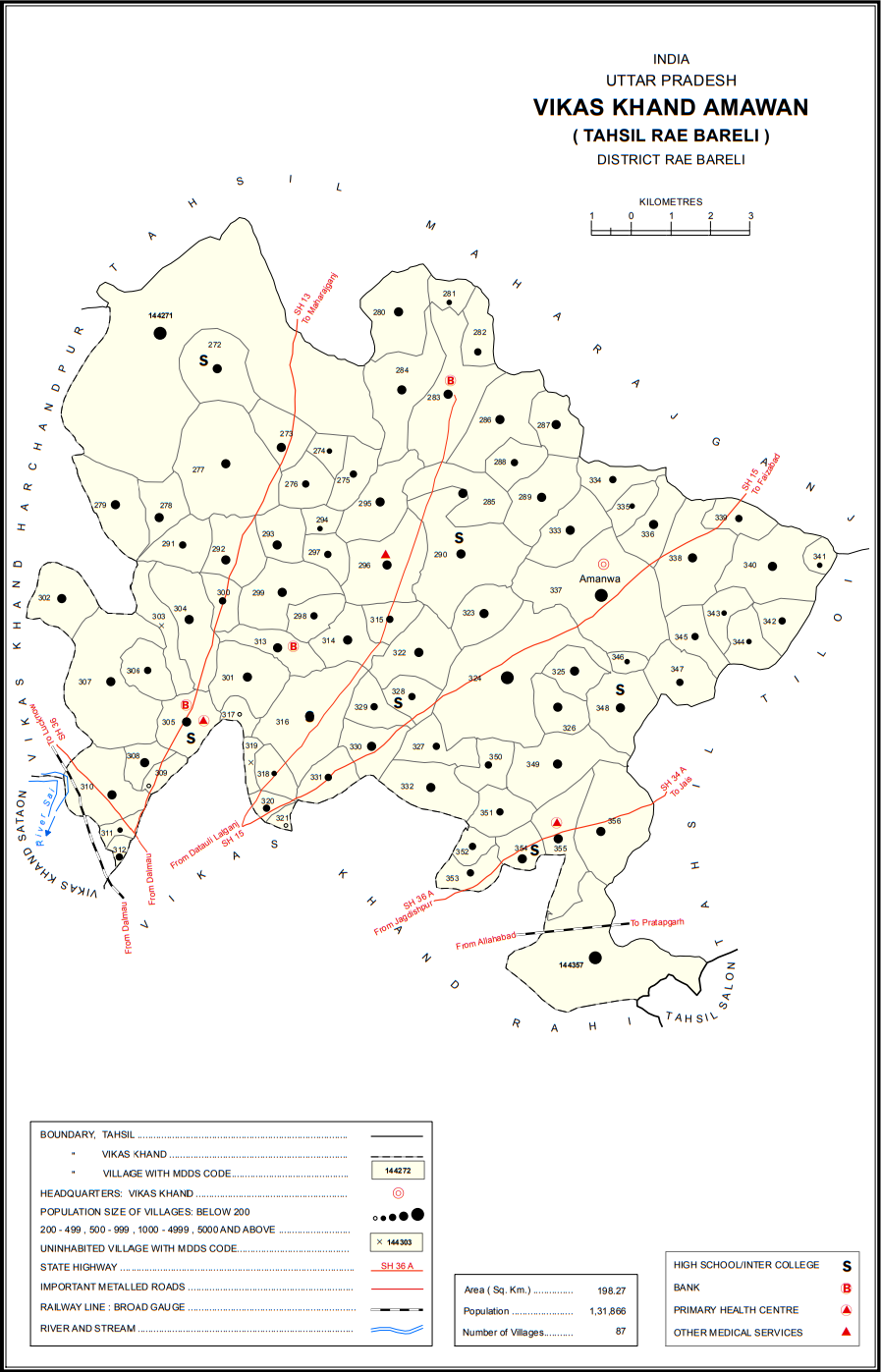
- Map showing Didauli (#310) in Amawan CD block

- Location in Uttar Pradesh, India
- Coordinates: 26.266184°N 81.227087°E
- Country India: India
- State: Uttar Pradesh
- District: Raebareli

Area
  - Total: 3.423 km^{2} (1.322 sq mi)

Population (2011)
  - Total: 1,709
  - Density: 499.3/km^{2} (1,293/sq mi)

Languages
  - Official: Hindi
- Time zone: UTC+5:30 (IST)
- Vehicle registration: UP-35

Didauli is a village in Amawan block of Rae Bareli district, Uttar Pradesh, India. It is located 8 km from Raebareli, the district headquarters. As of 2011, its population is 1,709, in 329 households. It has one primary school and no healthcare facilities.

The 1961 census recorded Didauli (as "Dindauli") as comprising 3 hamlets, with a total population of 631 people (329 male and 302 female), in 128 households and 112 physical houses. The area of the village was given as 875 acres.

The 1981 census recorded Didauli (as "Dendauli") as having a population of 948 people, in 160 households, and having an area of 342.38 hectares. The main staple foods were listed as wheat and rice.

Historically Didauli Comes under the Kayastha Talukdari seat of Hardaspur Estate Raebareli and ruled by Rani Jugraj Kunwari and Babu. Ganga Prasad Srivastava at Hardaspur Kothi Gangaganj Raebareli
