= Rampur, Amawan =

Rampur Rāmpur
- Village
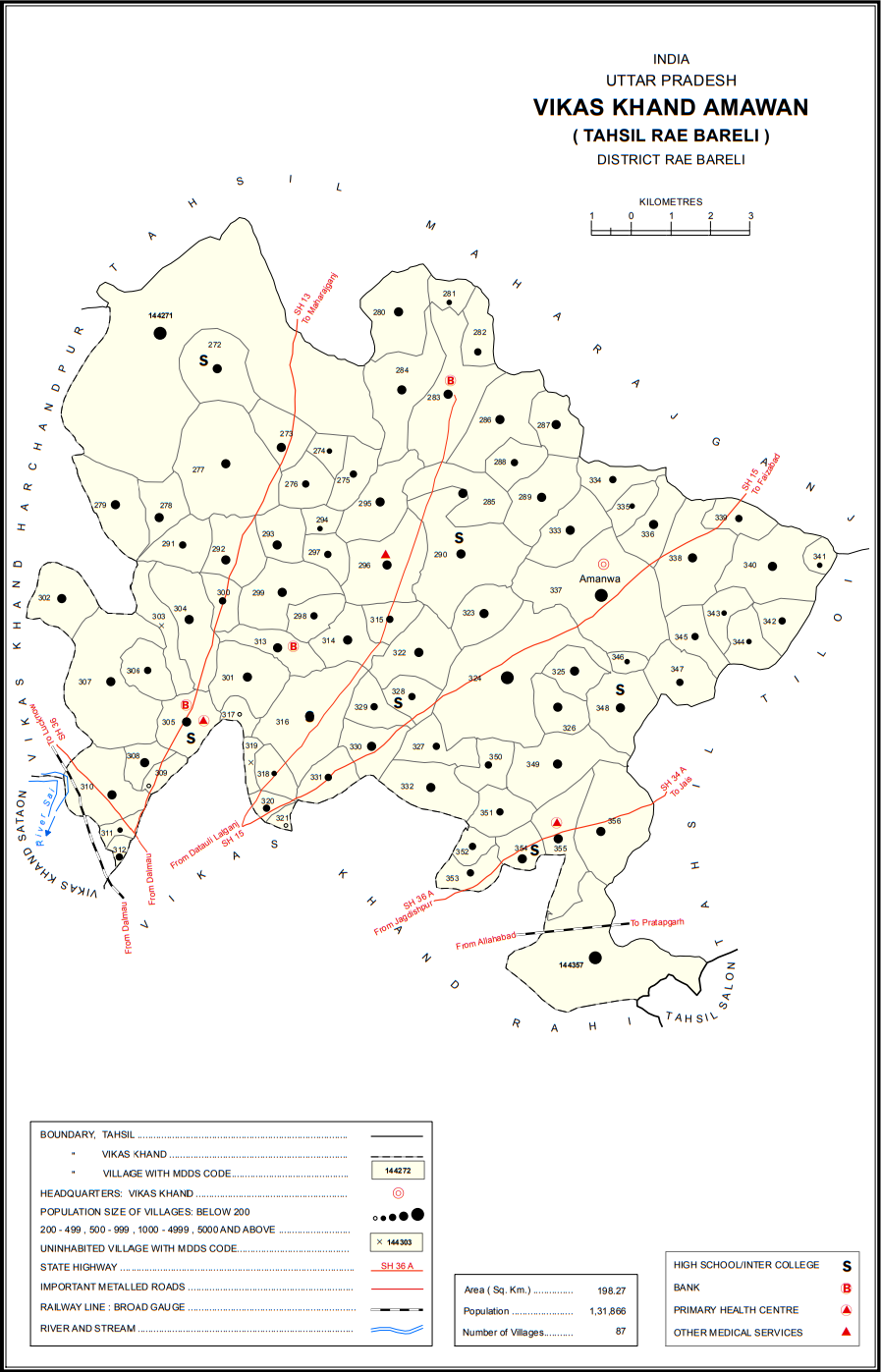
- Map showing Rampur (#309) in Amawan CD block

- Location in Uttar Pradesh, India
- Coordinates: 26.264087°N 81.239233°E
- Country India: India
- State: Uttar Pradesh
- District: Raebareli

Area
  - Total: 1.069 km^{2} (0.413 sq mi)

Population (2011)
  - Total: 22
  - Density: 21/km^{2} (53/sq mi)

Languages
  - Official: Hindi
- Time zone: UTC+5:30 (IST)
- Vehicle registration: UP-35

Rampur is a village in Amawan block of Rae Bareli district, Uttar Pradesh, India. It is located 7 km from Raebareli, the district headquarters. As of 2011, its population is 22, in 5 households. It has no schools and no healthcare facilities.

The 1961 census recorded Rampur as comprising 1 hamlet, with a total population of 50 people (22 male and 28 female), in 11 households and 11 physical houses. The area of the village was given as 271 acres.

The 1981 census recorded Rampur as being uninhabited and having an area of 106.84 hectares.
