= Lodhwamau =

Lodhwamau Lodhwāmau
- Village
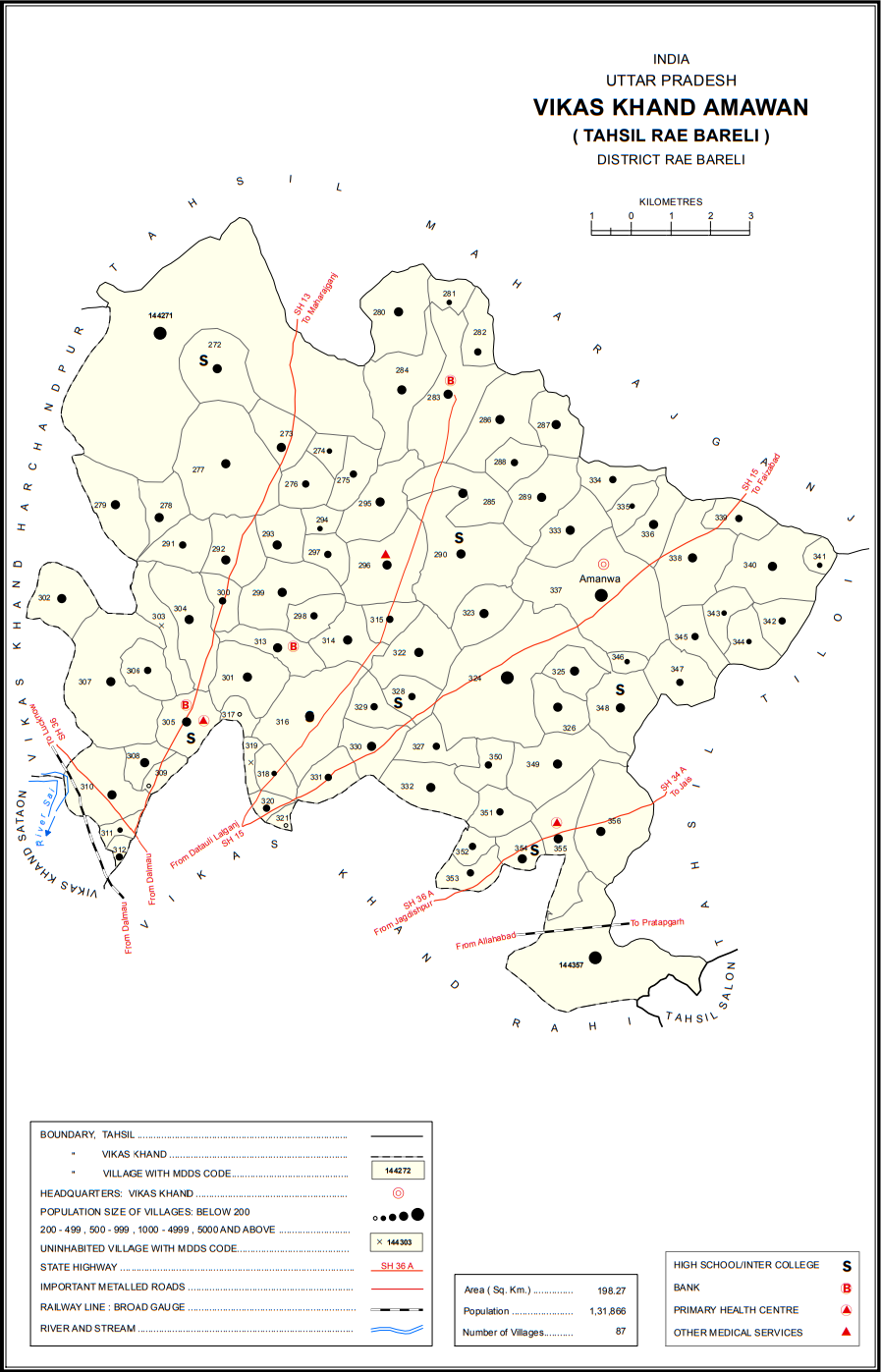
- Map showing Lodhwamau (#292) in Amawan CD block

- Location in Uttar Pradesh, India
- Coordinates: 26.318517°N 81.259666°E
- Country India: India
- State: Uttar Pradesh
- District: Raebareli

Area
  - Total: 1.81 km^{2} (0.70 sq mi)

Population (2011)
  - Total: 1,939
  - Density: 1,070/km^{2} (2,770/sq mi)

Languages
  - Official: Hindi
- Time zone: UTC+5:30 (IST)
- Vehicle registration: UP-35

Lodhwamau is a village in Amawan block of Rae Bareli district, Uttar Pradesh, India. It is located 15 km from Raebareli, the district headquarters. As of 2011, its population is 1,939, in 359 households. It has one primary school and no healthcare facilities.

The 1961 census recorded Lodhwamau as comprising 4 hamlets, with a total population of 836 people (420 male and 416 female), in 184 households and 169 physical houses. The area of the village was given as 445 acres.

The 1981 census recorded Lodhwamau as having a population of 1,206 people, in 239 households, and having an area of 169.57 hectares. The main staple foods were listed as wheat and rice.
