= Hilgi =

- Village
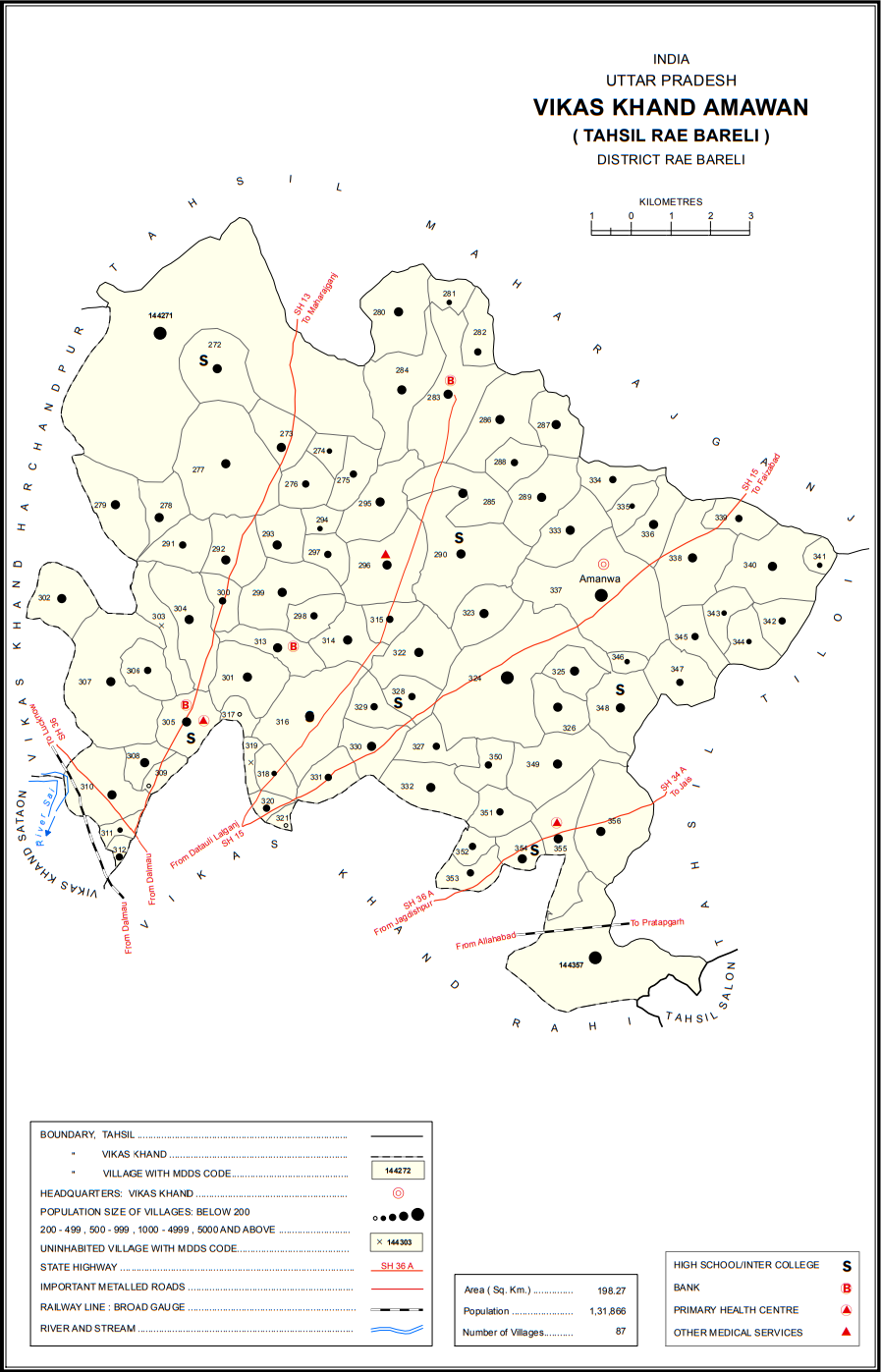
- Map showing Hilgi (#279) in Amawan CD block

- Location in Uttar Pradesh, India
- Coordinates: 26.328782°N 81.228053°E
- Country India: India
- State: Uttar Pradesh
- District: Raebareli

Area
  - Total: 1.197 km^{2} (0.462 sq mi)

Population (2011)
  - Total: 1,106
  - Density: 924.0/km^{2} (2,393/sq mi)

Languages
  - Official: Hindi
- Time zone: UTC+5:30 (IST)
- Vehicle registration: UP-35

Hilgi is a village in Amawan block of Rae Bareli district, Uttar Pradesh, India. It is located 18 km from Raebareli, the district headquarters. As of 2011, its population is 1,106, in 199 households. It has one primary school and no healthcare facilities.

The 1961 census recorded Hilgi (as "Hilagi") as comprising 4 hamlets, with a total population of 421 people (214 male and 207 female), in 115 households and 104 physical houses. The area of the village was given as 296 acres.

The 1981 census recorded Hilgi as having a population of 627 people, in 124 households, and having an area of 119.79 hectares. The main staple foods were listed as wheat and rice.
