= Paharpur Mardanpur =

Paharpur Mardanpur Paharpur Mardānpur
- Village
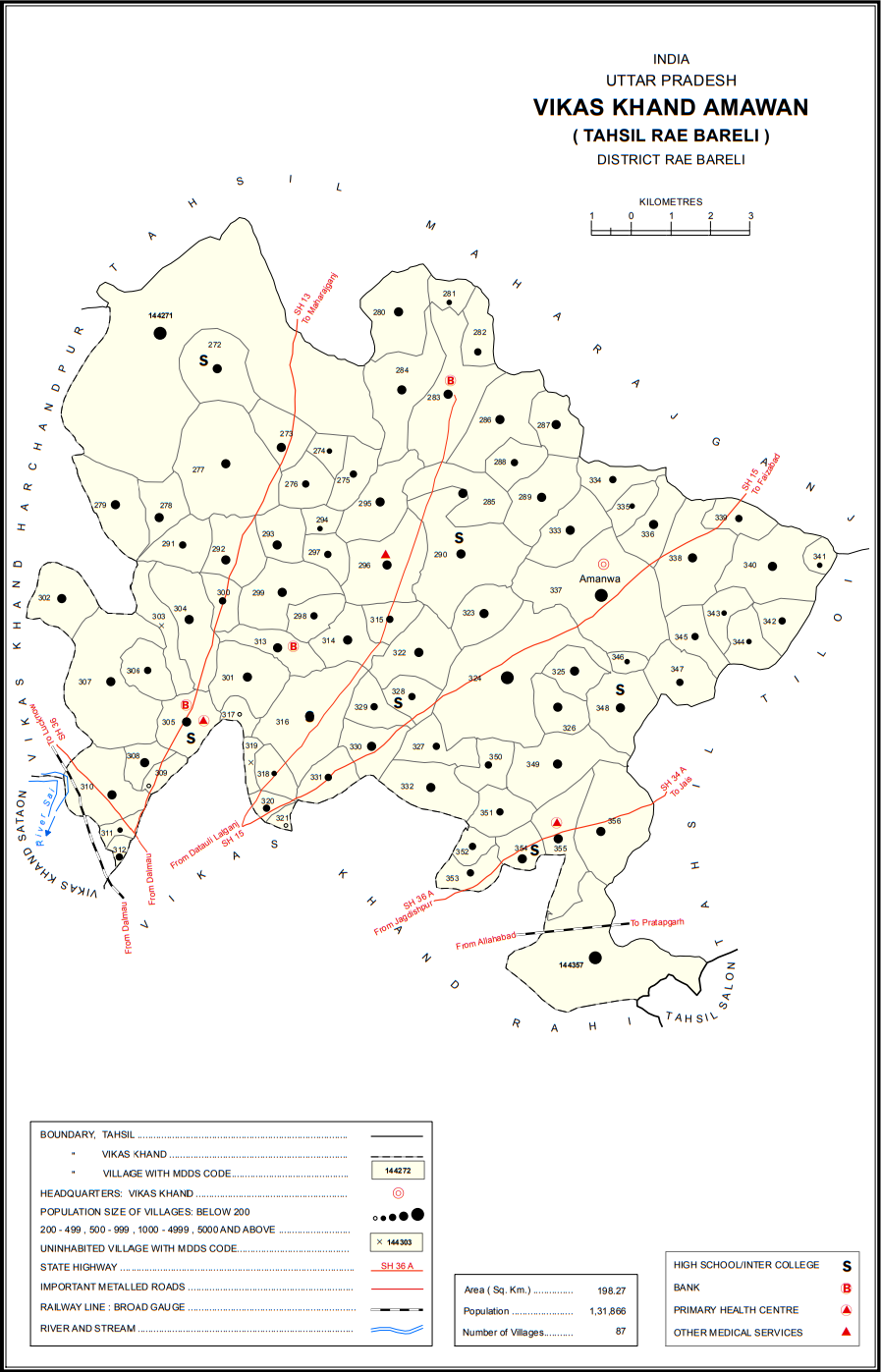
- Map showing Paharpur Mardanpur (#293) in Amawan CD block

- Location in Uttar Pradesh, India
- Coordinates: 26.321104°N 81.271822°E
- Country India: India
- State: Uttar Pradesh
- District: Raebareli

Area
  - Total: 1.503 km^{2} (0.580 sq mi)

Population (2011)
  - Total: 1,390
  - Density: 925/km^{2} (2,400/sq mi)

Languages
  - Official: Hindi
- Time zone: UTC+5:30 (IST)
- Vehicle registration: UP-35

Paharpur Mardanpur is a village in Amawan block of Rae Bareli district, Uttar Pradesh, India. It is located 15 km from Raebareli, the district headquarters. As of 2011, its population is 1,390, in 218 households. It has one primary school and no healthcare facilities.

The 1961 census recorded Paharpur Mardanpur as comprising 2 hamlets, with a total population of 598 people (287 male and 311 female), in 118 households and 104 physical houses. The area of the village was given as 384 acres.

The 1981 census recorded Paharpur Mardanpur (as "Paharpur Mardapur") as having a population of 798 people, in 153 households, and having an area of 147.72 hectares. The main staple foods were listed as wheat and rice.
