= Haibatmau =

- Village
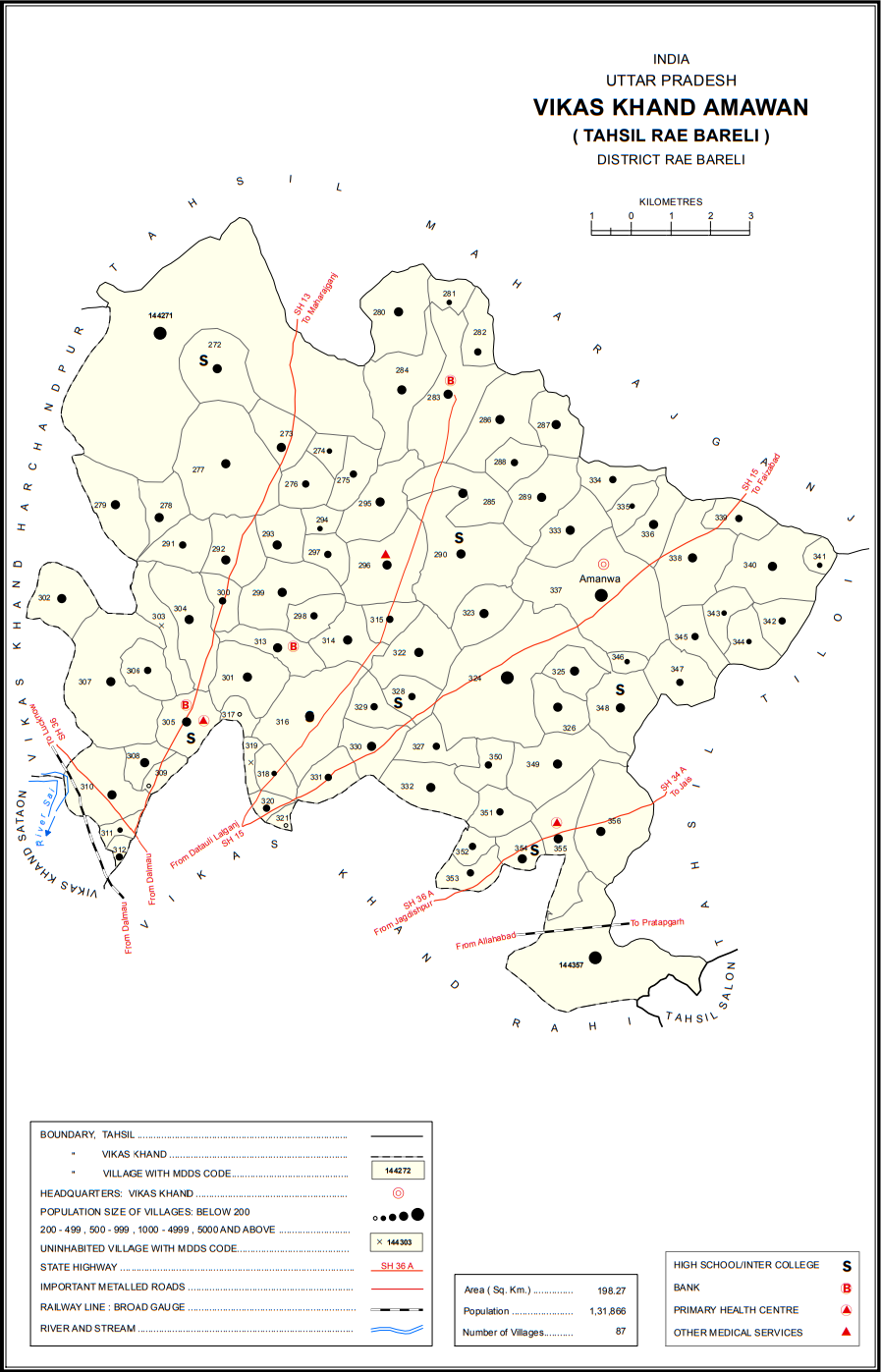
- Map showing Haibatmau (#353) in Amawan CD block

- Location in Uttar Pradesh, India
- Coordinates: 26.245968°N 81.32017°E
- Country India: India
- State: Uttar Pradesh
- District: Raebareli

Area
  - Total: 1.006 km^{2} (0.388 sq mi)

Population (2011)
  - Total: 854
  - Density: 849/km^{2} (2,200/sq mi)

Languages
  - Official: Hindi
- Time zone: UTC+5:30 (IST)
- Vehicle registration: UP-35

Haibatmau is a village in Amawan block of Rae Bareli district, Uttar Pradesh, India. It is located 10 km from Raebareli, the district headquarters. As of 2011, its population is 854, in 142 households. It has one primary school and no healthcare facilities.

The 1961 census recorded Haibatmau as comprising 2 hamlets, with a total population of 318 people (155 male and 163 female), in 61 households and 59 physical houses. The area of the village was given as 265 acres.

The 1981 census recorded Haibatmau as having a population of 460 people, in 75 households, and having an area of 105.22 hectares. The main staple foods were listed as wheat and rice.
