= Kondras Khurd =

- Village
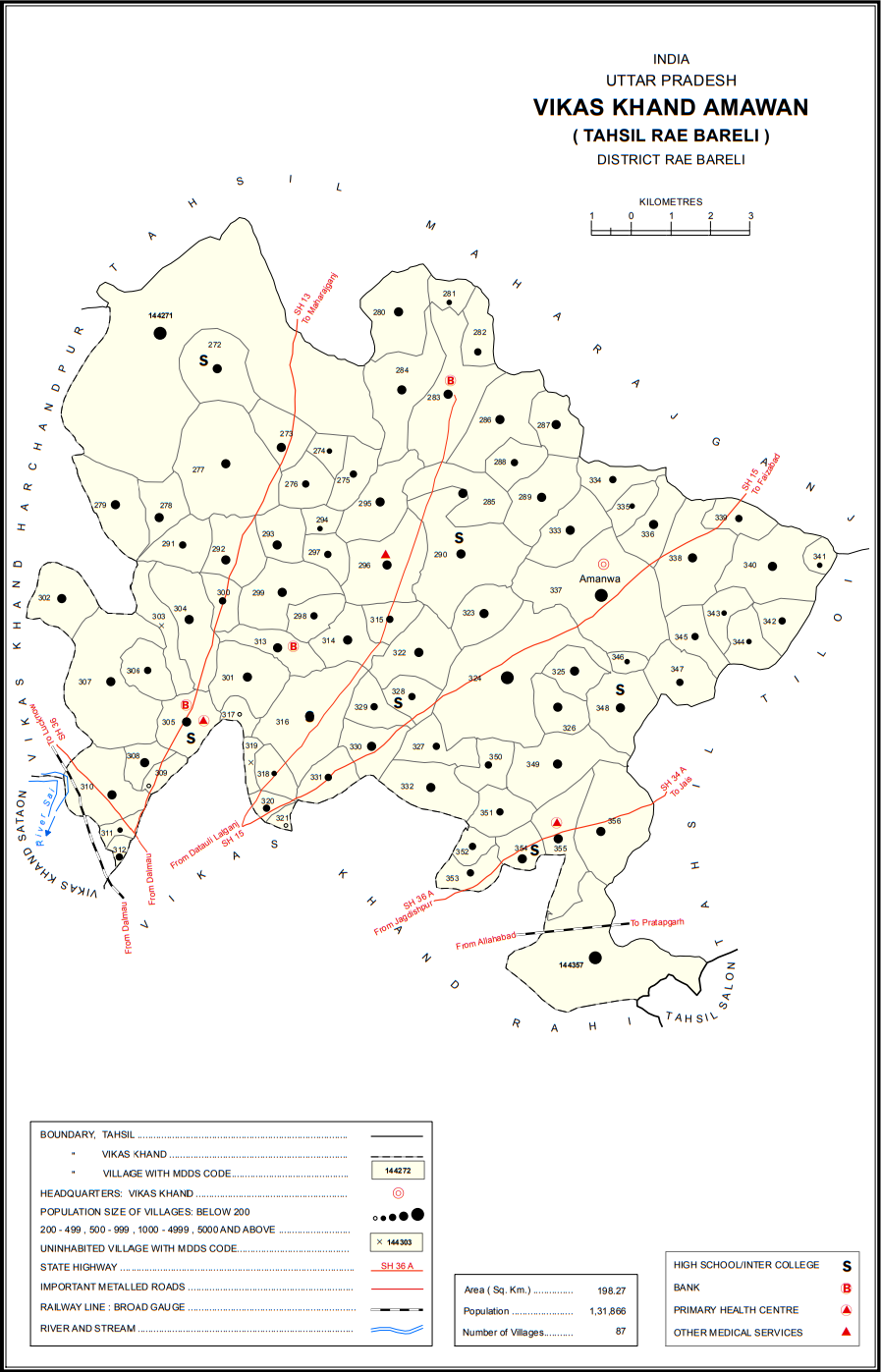
- Map showing Kondras Khurd (#318) in Amawan CD block

- Location in Uttar Pradesh, India
- Coordinates: 26.267748°N 81.266805°E
- Country India: India
- State: Uttar Pradesh
- District: Raebareli

Area
  - Total: 0.787 km^{2} (0.304 sq mi)

Population (2011)
  - Total: 296
  - Density: 376/km^{2} (974/sq mi)

Languages
  - Official: Hindi
- Time zone: UTC+5:30 (IST)
- Vehicle registration: UP-35

Kondras Khurd is a village in Amawan block of Rae Bareli district, Uttar Pradesh, India. It is located 5 km from Raebareli, the district headquarters. As of 2011, its population is 296, in 61 households.

The 1961 census recorded Kondras Khurd as comprising 1 hamlet, with a total population of 104 people (58 male and 46 female), in 27 households and 24 physical houses. The area of the village was given as 195 acres.

The 1981 census recorded Kondras Khurd (as "Kundras Khurd") as having a population of 205 people, in 38 households, and having an area of 79.32 hectares. The main staple foods were listed as wheat and rice.
