= Pahremau =

- Village
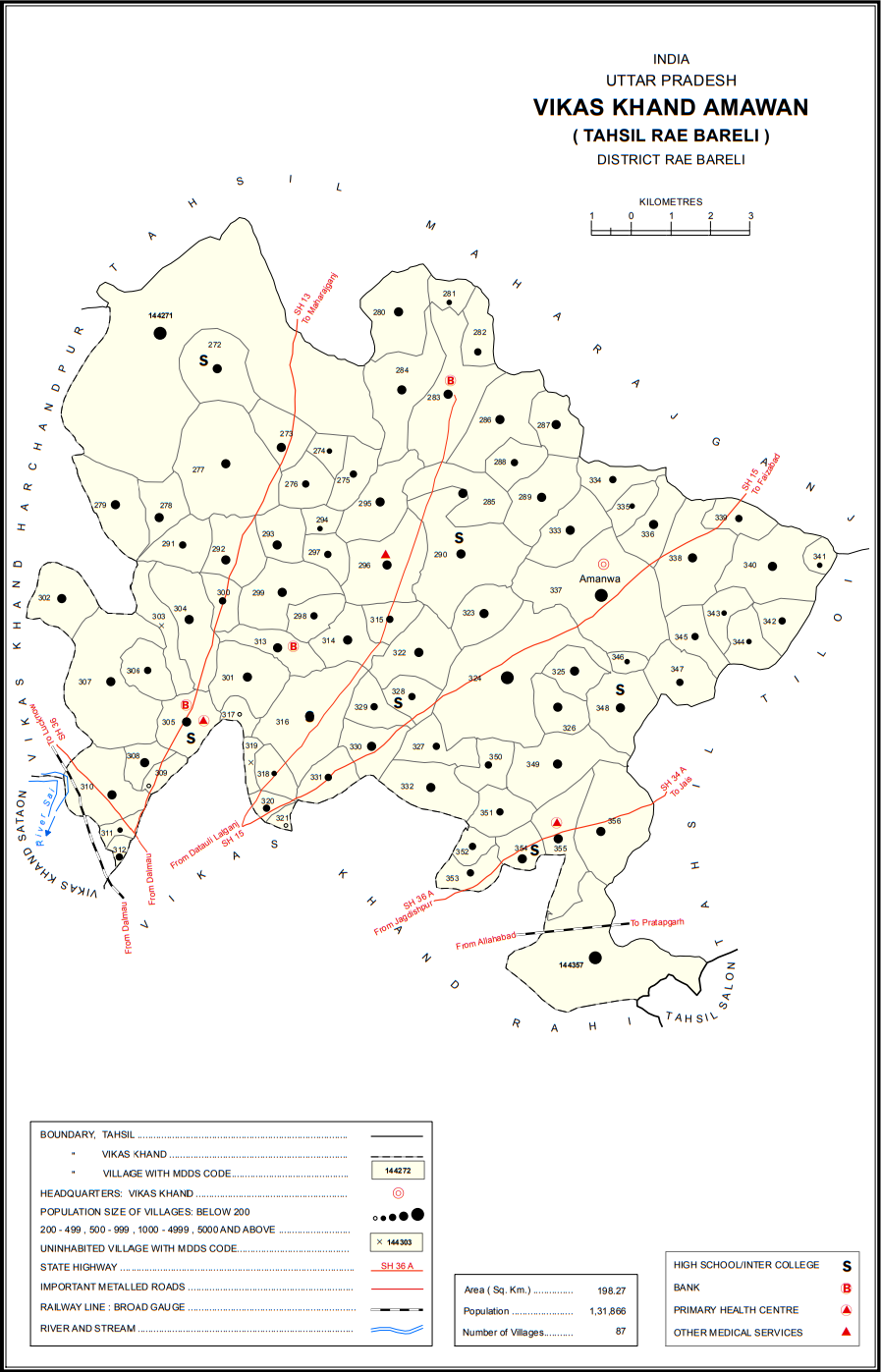
- Map showing Pahremau (#283) in Amawan CD block

- Location in Uttar Pradesh, India
- Coordinates: 26.350742°N 81.313042°E
- Country India: India
- State: Uttar Pradesh
- District: Raebareli

Area
  - Total: 3.952 km^{2} (1.526 sq mi)

Population (2011)
  - Total: 3,165
  - Density: 800.9/km^{2} (2,074/sq mi)

Languages
  - Official: Hindi
- Time zone: UTC+5:30 (IST)
- Vehicle registration: UP-35

Pahremau is a village in Amawan block of Rae Bareli district, Uttar Pradesh, India. Located 5 km from Maharajganj on the road to Nigohan, it is an old Muslim centre that historically served as the headquarters of a taluqdari estate. As of 2011, its population is 3,165, in 577 households. It has 3 primary schools and no healthcare facilities.

== History ==
The taluqdars of Pahremau were a family of Niyazi Pathans that shared a common ancestry with the taluqdars of Amawan. The two branches were originally split between the brothers Qadirdad Khan and Sher Zaman Khan, with Qadirdad Khan receiving Pahremau. He was succeeded by his only son, Najib Khan, who died in 1855, and the Pahremau estate was then split between his four sons.

At the turn of the 20th century, Pahremau was described as an old village that was "compactly built on a large mound." Its population as of 1901 was 1,164, a majority of whom were Muslims.

The 1961 census recorded Pahremau (as "Paharemau") as comprising 14 hamlets, with a total population of 1,202 people (625 male and 577 female), in 268 households and 245 physical houses. The area of the village was given as 983 acres.

The 1981 census recorded Pahremau as having a population of 1,575 people, in 315 households, and having an area of 678.28 hectares. The main staple foods were given as wheat and rice.
