= Oya, Raebareli =

Oya
- Village
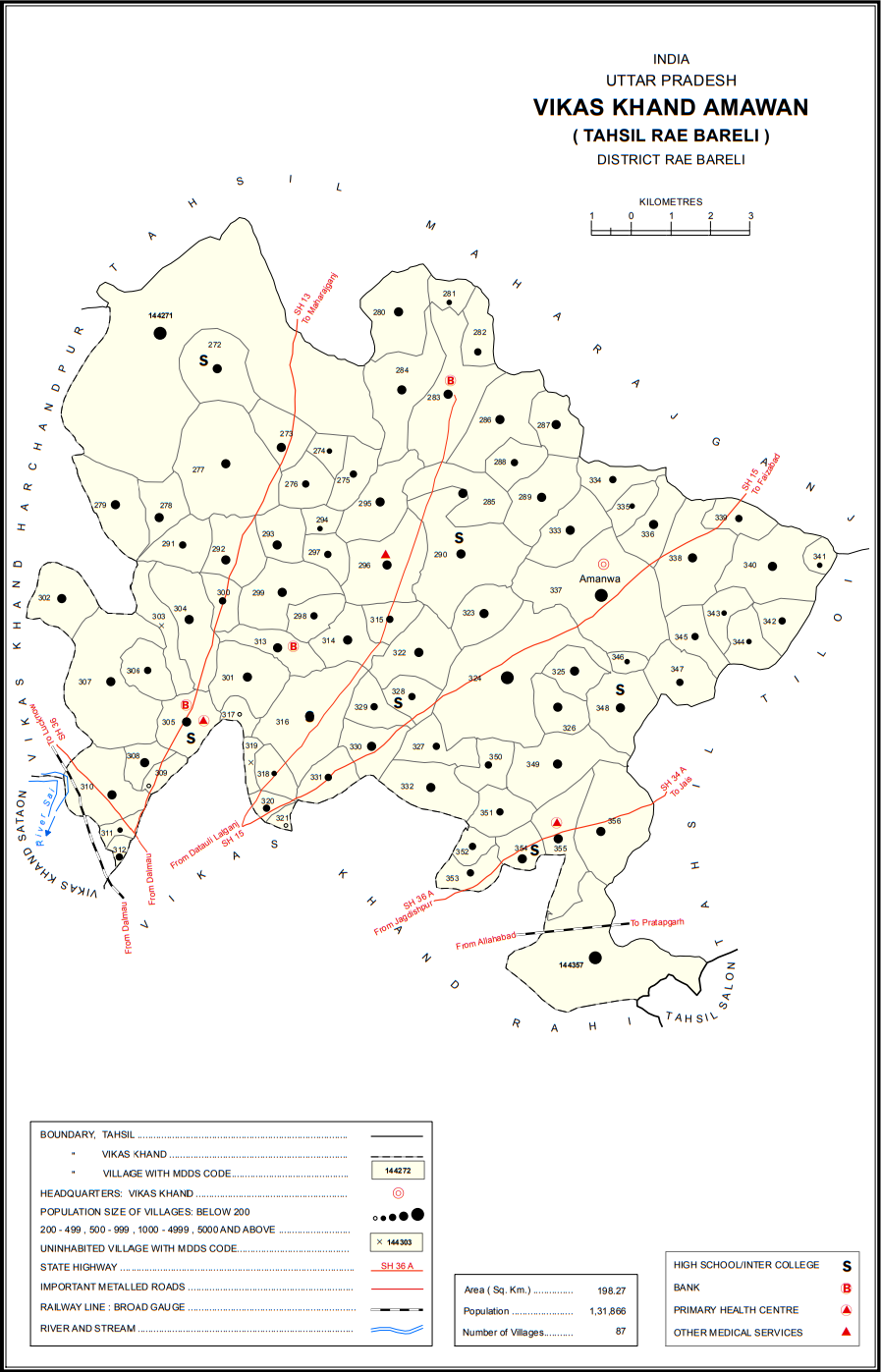
- Map showing Oya (#284) in Amawan CD block

- Location in Uttar Pradesh, India
- Coordinates: 26.353631°N 81.305875°E
- Country India: India
- State: Uttar Pradesh
- District: Raebareli

Area
  - Total: 2.767 km^{2} (1.068 sq mi)

Population (2011)
  - Total: 1,635
  - Density: 590.9/km^{2} (1,530/sq mi)

Languages
  - Official: Hindi
- Time zone: UTC+5:30 (IST)
- Vehicle registration: UP-35

Oya is a village in Amawan block of Rae Bareli district, Uttar Pradesh, India. As of 2011, its population is 1,635, in 309 households. It has one primary school and no healthcare facilities.

The 1961 census recorded Oya as comprising 5 hamlets, with a total population of 592 people (300 male and 292 female), in 120 households and 105 physical houses. The area of the village was given as 739 acres.

The 1981 census recorded Oya as having a population of 807 people, in 145 households, and having an area of 276.81 hectares. The main staple foods were listed as wheat and rice.
