= Khaspari =

- Village
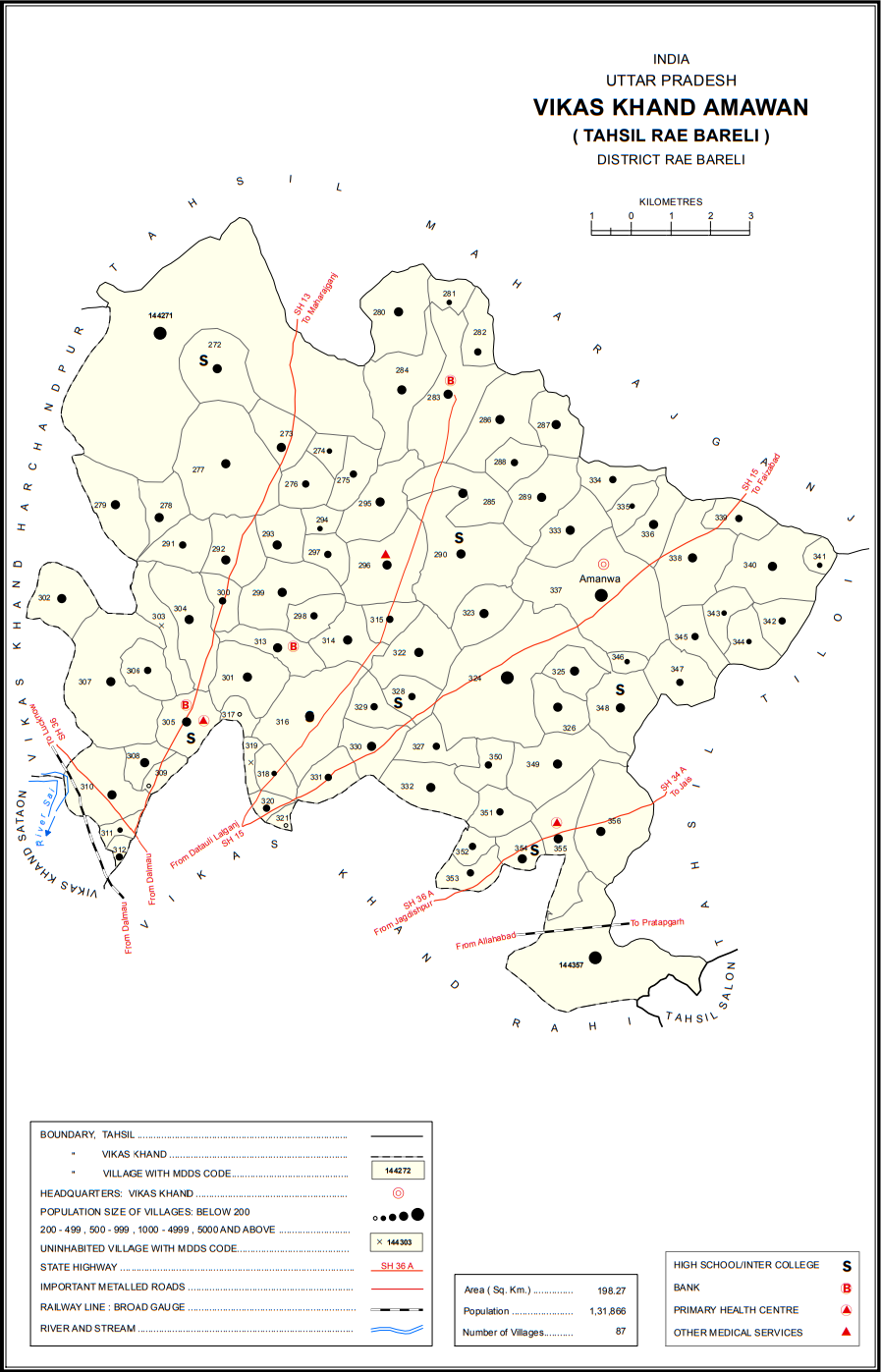
- Map showing Khaspari (#321) in Amawan CD block

- Location in Uttar Pradesh, India
- Coordinates: 26.254787°N 81.262412°E
- Country India: India
- State: Uttar Pradesh
- District: Raebareli

Area
  - Total: 0.924 km^{2} (0.357 sq mi)

Population (2011)
  - Total: 1
  - Density: 1.1/km^{2} (2.8/sq mi)

Languages
  - Official: Hindi
- Time zone: UTC+5:30 (IST)
- Vehicle registration: UP-35

Khaspari is a village in Amawan block of Rae Bareli district, Uttar Pradesh, India. It is located 4 km from Raebareli, the district headquarters. As of 2011, its population is 1, in 1 household. It has no schools and no healthcare facilities.

The 1961 census recorded Khaspari as comprising 1 hamlet, with a total population of 620 people (303 male and 312 female), in 134 households and 127 physical houses. The area of the village was given as 240 acres.

The 1981 census recorded Khaspari as being uninhabited and having an area of 95.91 hectares.

== Archaeology ==
During routine exploration of Raebareli district in the late 1990s, archaeologists D. P. Tewari and Anoop Kumar Singh came across some redware and brickbats which they assigned tentatively to the medieval period.
