= Pindari Kalan =

Pindari Kalan Pindāri Kalān
- Village
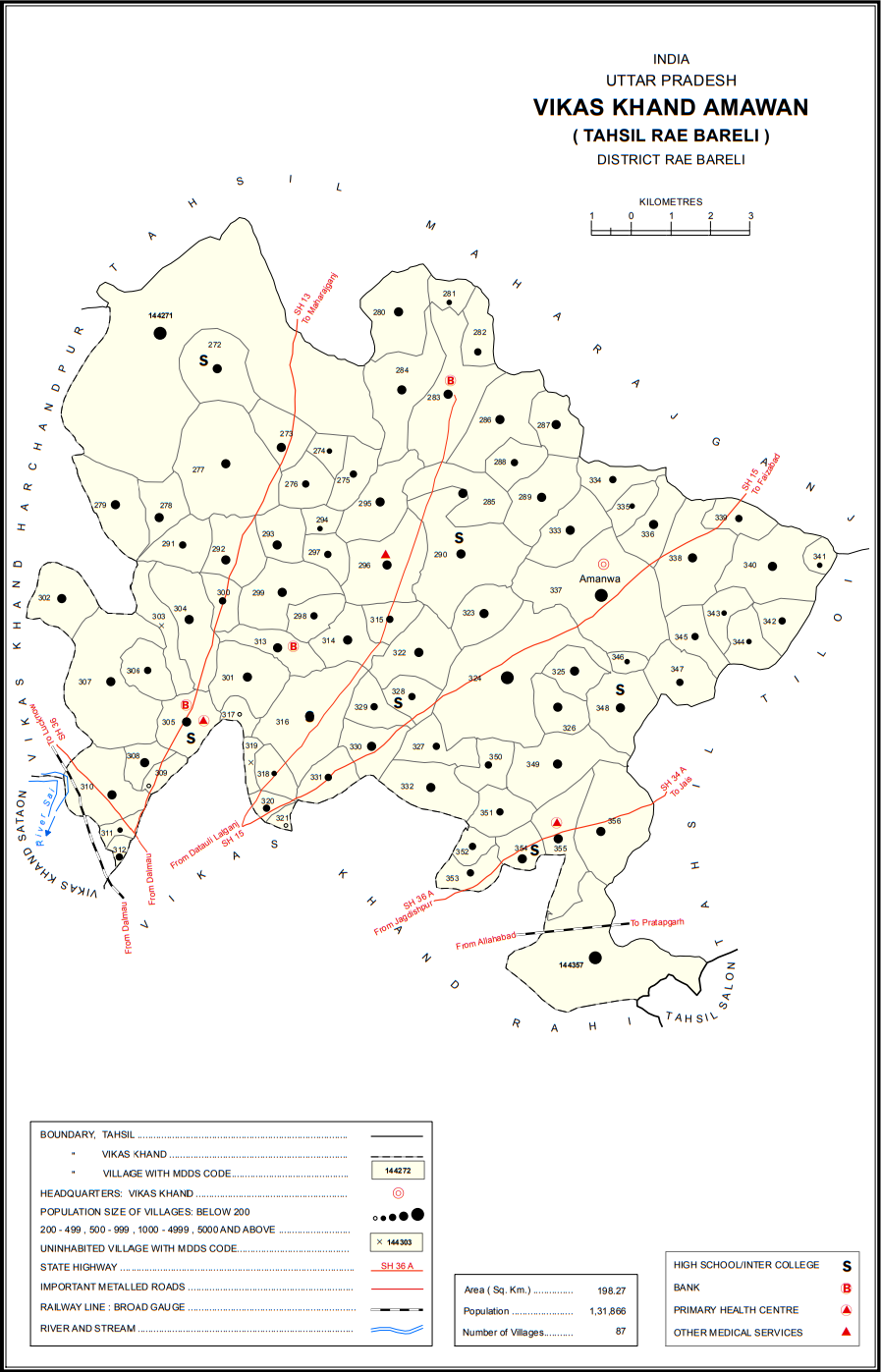
- Map showing Pindari Kalan (#290) in Amawan CD block

- Location in Uttar Pradesh, India
- Coordinates: 26.31591°N 81.317444°E
- Country India: India
- State: Uttar Pradesh
- District: Raebareli

Area
  - Total: 5.696 km^{2} (2.199 sq mi)

Population (2011)
  - Total: 3,960
  - Density: 695/km^{2} (1,800/sq mi)

Languages
  - Official: Hindi
- Time zone: UTC+5:30 (IST)
- Vehicle registration: UP-35

Pindari Kalan is a village in Amawan block of Rae Bareli district, Uttar Pradesh, India. As of 2011, its population is 3,960, in 671 households. It has one primary school and no healthcare facilities.

The 1961 census recorded Pindari Kalan as comprising 15 hamlets, with a total population of 1,661 people (833 male and 828 female), in 356 households and 314 physical houses. The area of the village was given as 1,442 acres.

The 1981 census recorded Pindari Kalan (as "Pendari Kalan") as having a population of 2,210 people, in 420 households, and having an area of 569.82 hectares. The main staple foods were listed as wheat and rice.
