= Pindari Khurd =

- Village
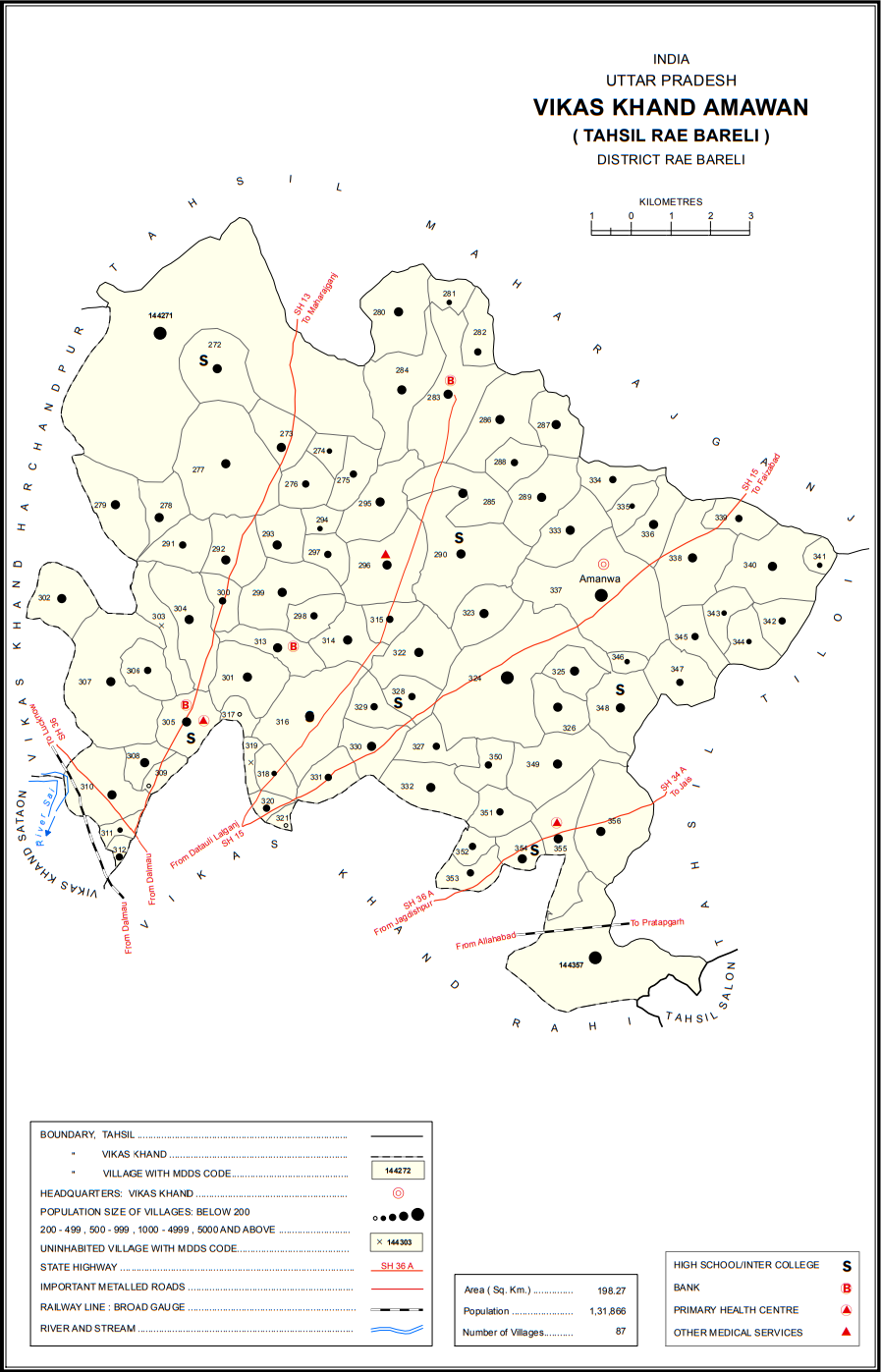
- Map showing Pindari Khurd (#323) in Amawan CD block

- Location in Uttar Pradesh, India
- Coordinates: 26.304389°N 81.321647°E
- Country India: India
- State: Uttar Pradesh
- District: Raebareli

Area
  - Total: 2.194 km^{2} (0.847 sq mi)

Population (2011)
  - Total: 1,615
  - Density: 736.1/km^{2} (1,906/sq mi)

Languages
  - Official: Hindi
- Time zone: UTC+5:30 (IST)
- Vehicle registration: UP-35

Pindari Khurd is a village in Amawan block of Rae Bareli district, Uttar Pradesh, India. It is located 9 km from Raebareli, the district headquarters. As of 2011, its population is 1,615, in 300 households. It has one primary school and no healthcare facilities.

The 1961 census recorded Pindari Khurd as comprising 5 hamlets, with a total population of 697 people (347 male and 350 female), in 159 households and 147 physical houses. The area of the village was given as 544 acres.

The 1981 census recorded Pindari Khurd (as "Pendari Khurd") as having a population of 843 people, in 164 households, and having an area of 220.56 hectares. The main staple foods were listed as wheat and rice.
