= Adampur, Raebareli =

Adampur
- Village
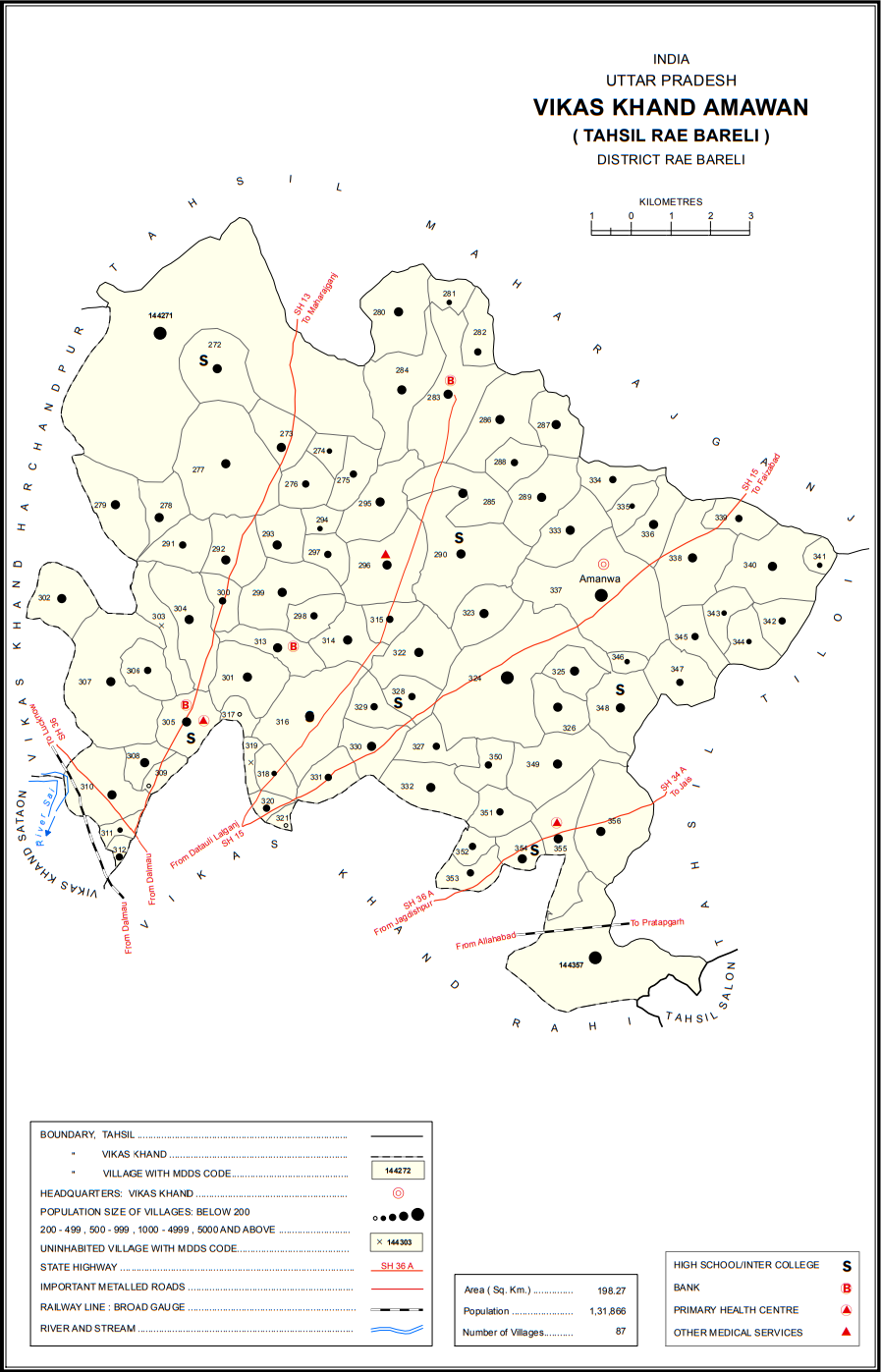
- Map showing Adampur (#313) in Amawan CD block

- Location in Uttar Pradesh, India
- Coordinates: 26.299743°N 81.270839°E
- Country India: India
- State: Uttar Pradesh
- District: Raebareli

Area
  - Total: 1.514 km^{2} (0.585 sq mi)

Population (2011)
  - Total: 1,779
  - Density: 1,175/km^{2} (3,043/sq mi)

Languages
  - Official: Hindi
- Time zone: UTC+5:30 (IST)
- Vehicle registration: UP-35

Adampur is a village in Amawan block of Rae Bareli district, Uttar Pradesh, India. As of 2011, its population is 1,779, in 323 households. It has one primary school and no healthcare facilities.

The 1961 census recorded Adampur as comprising 3 hamlets, with a total population of 666 people (369 male and 297 female), in 156 households and 148 physical houses. The area of the village was given as 381 acres.

The 1981 census recorded Adampur as having a population of 1,109 people and an area of 151.36 hectares. The main staple foods were listed as juwar and bajra.
