= Jamalpur Karaundi =

Jamalpur Karaundi Jamālpur Karaundi
- Village
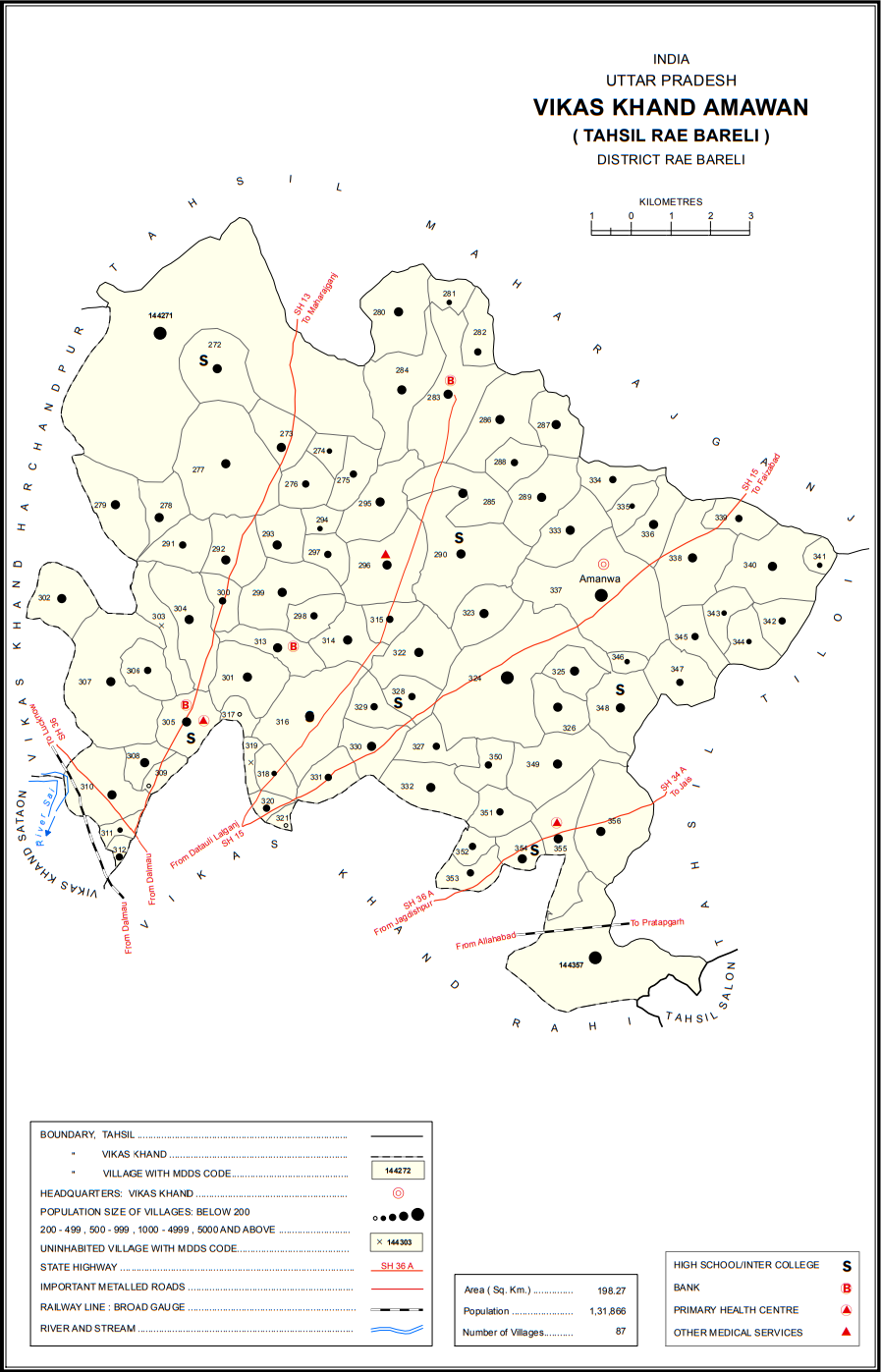
- Map showing Jamalpur Karaundi (#300) in Amawan CD block

- Location in Uttar Pradesh, India
- Coordinates: 26.308298°N 81.257052°E
- Country India: India
- State: Uttar Pradesh
- District: Raebareli

Area
  - Total: 1.04 km^{2} (0.40 sq mi)

Population (2011)
  - Total: 630
  - Density: 610/km^{2} (1,600/sq mi)

Languages
  - Official: Hindi
- Time zone: UTC+5:30 (IST)
- Vehicle registration: UP-35

Jamalpur Karaundi is a village in Amawan block of Rae Bareli district, Uttar Pradesh, India. It is located 11 km from Raebareli, the district headquarters. As of 2011, its population is 630, in 125 households.

The 1961 census recorded Jamalpur Karaundi as comprising 2 hamlets, with a total population of 257 people (130 male and 127 female), in 54 households and 51 physical houses. The area of the village was given as 256 acres.

The 1981 census recorded Jamalpur Karaundi as having a population of 341 people, in 65 households, and having an area of 99.56 hectares. The main staple foods were listed as wheat and rice.
