= Chaupura =

- Village
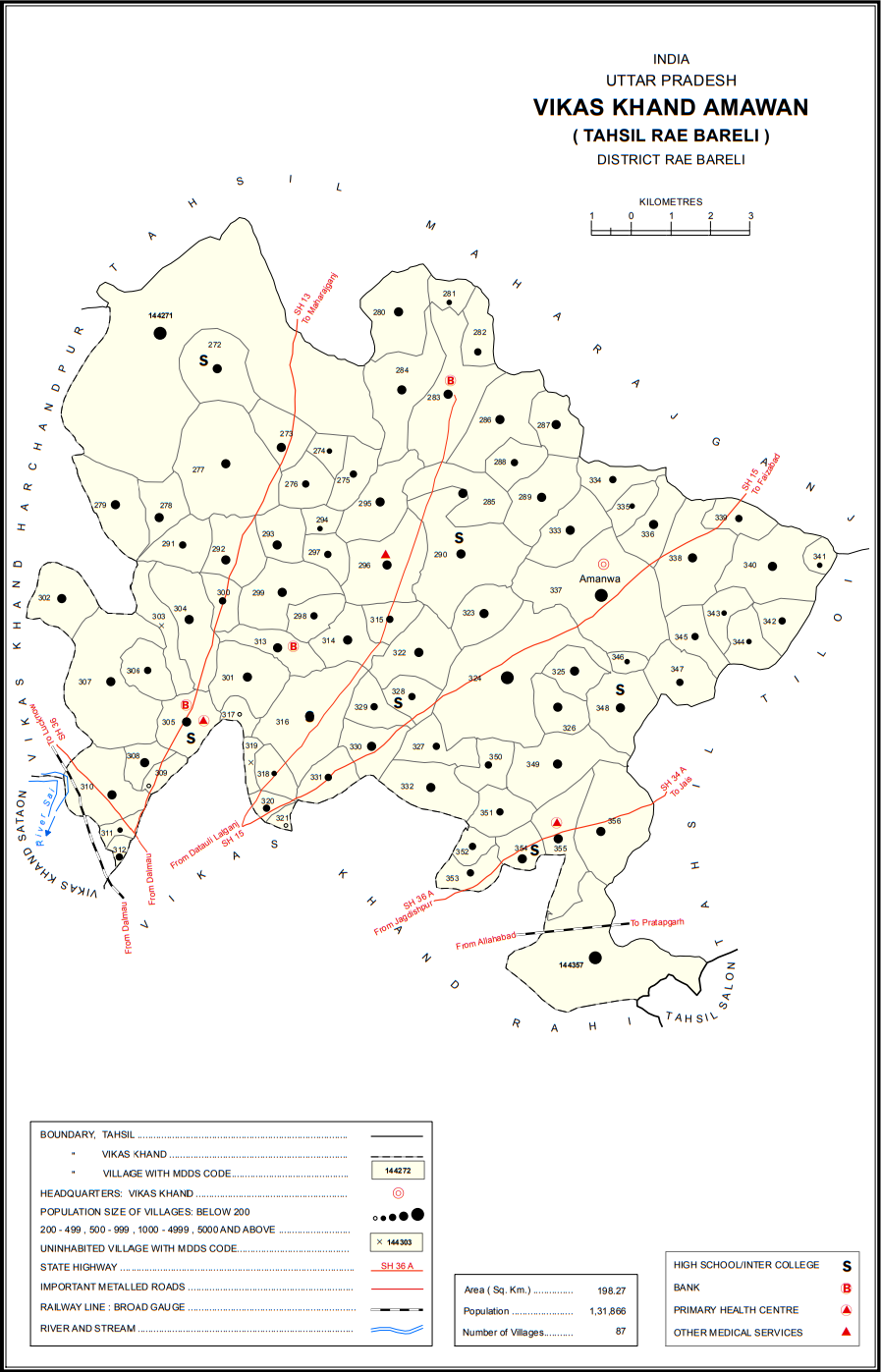
- Map showing Chaupura (#302) in Amawan CD block

- Location in Uttar Pradesh, India
- Coordinates: 26.307106°N 81.21393°E
- Country India: India
- State: Uttar Pradesh
- District: Raebareli

Area
  - Total: 1.82 km^{2} (0.70 sq mi)

Population (2011)
  - Total: 1,107
  - Density: 608/km^{2} (1,580/sq mi)

Languages
  - Official: Hindi
- Time zone: UTC+5:30 (IST)
- Vehicle registration: UP-35

Chaupura is a village in Amawan block of Rae Bareli district, Uttar Pradesh, India. It is located 13 km from Raebareli, the district headquarters. As of 2011, its population is 1,107, in 203 households. It has one primary school and no healthcare facilities.

The 1961 census recorded Chaupura as comprising 3 hamlets, with a total population of 459 people (236 male and 223 female), in 105 households and 98 physical houses. The area of the village was given as 469 acres.

The 1981 census recorded Chaupura as having a population of 606 people, in 117 households, and having an area of 181.71 hectares. The main staple foods were listed as wheat and rice.
