= Kachaunda Nankari =

Kachaunda Nankari Kachaunda Nankāri
- Village
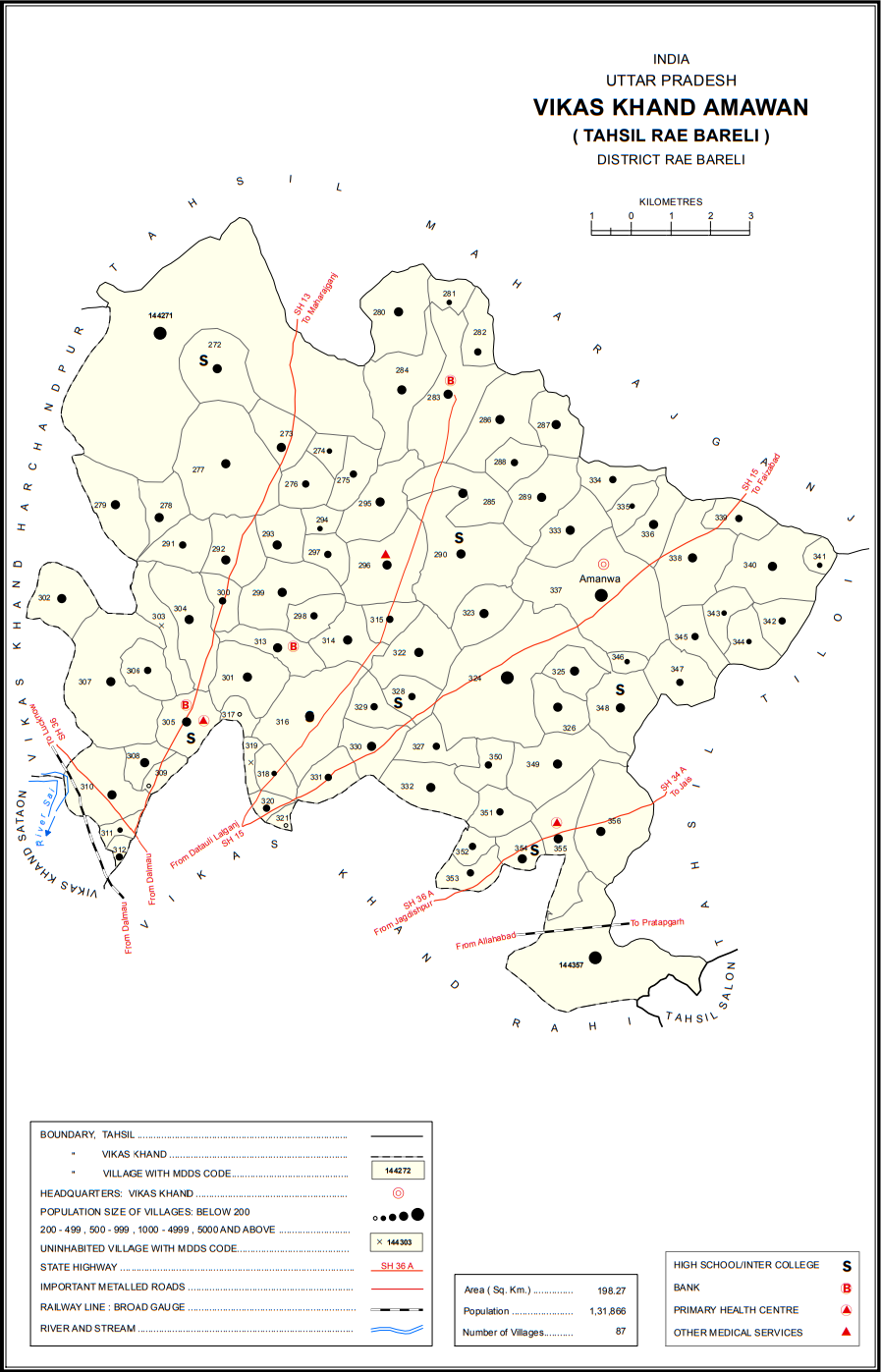
- Map showing Kachaunda Nankari (#304) in Amawan CD block

- Location in Uttar Pradesh, India
- Coordinates: 26.299075°N 81.251226°E
- Country India: India
- State: Uttar Pradesh
- District: Raebareli

Area
  - Total: 2.75 km^{2} (1.06 sq mi)

Population (2011)
  - Total: 1,485
  - Density: 540/km^{2} (1,400/sq mi)

Languages
  - Official: Hindi
- Time zone: UTC+5:30 (IST)
- Vehicle registration: UP-35

Kachauna Nankari is a village in Amawan block of Rae Bareli district, Uttar Pradesh, India. It is located 10 km from Raebareli, the district headquarters. As of 2011, its population is 1,485, in 271 households. It has one primary school and no healthcare facilities.

The 1961 census recorded Kachaunda Nankari as comprising 4 hamlets, with a total population of 680 people (370 male and 310 female), in 123 households and 100 physical houses. The area of the village was given as 732 acres.

The 1981 census recorded Kachaunda Nankari as having a population of 929 people, in 176 households, and having an area of 269.93 hectares. The main staple foods were listed as wheat and rice.
