= Sidhauna =

- Village
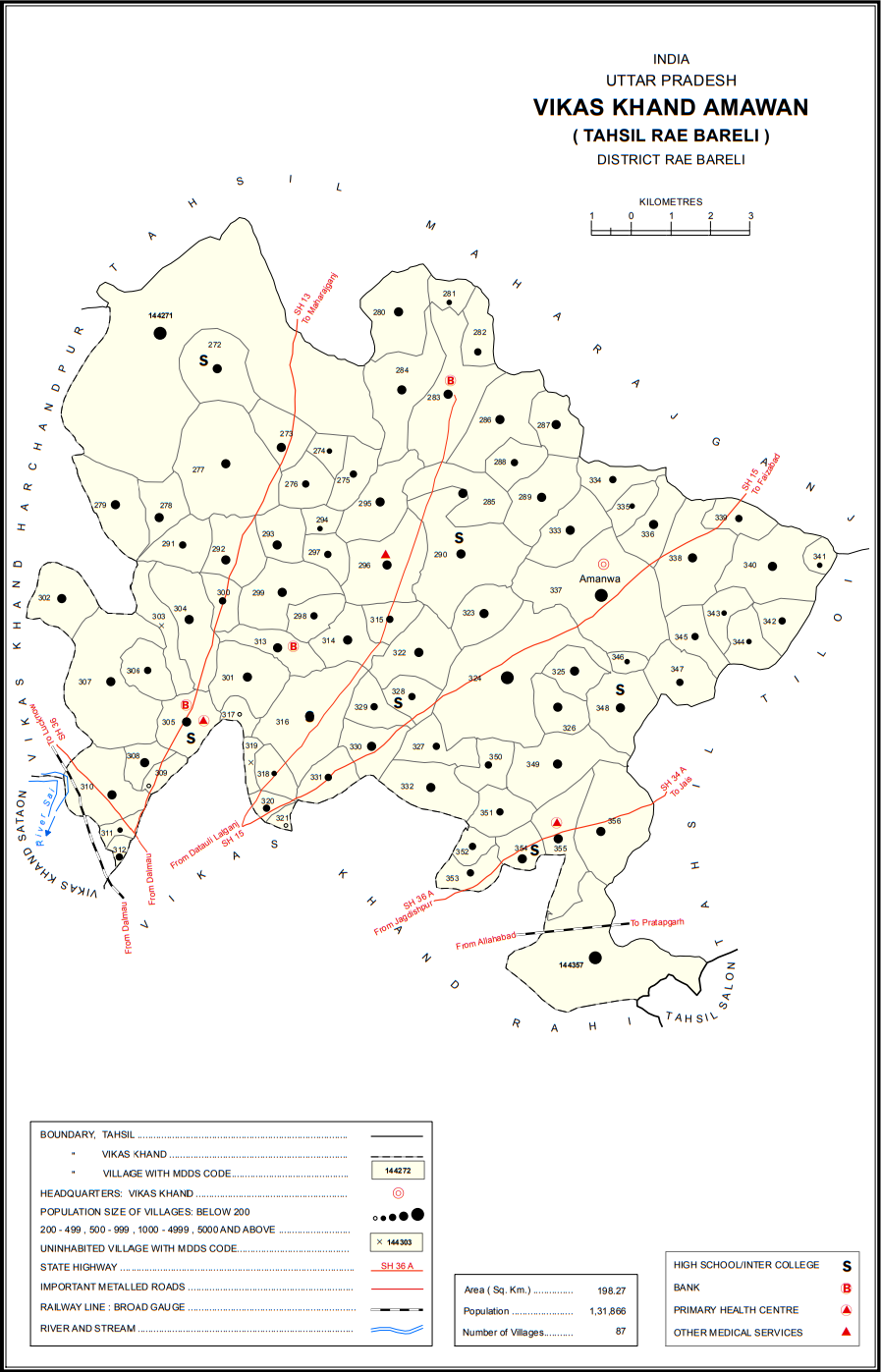
- Map showing Sidhauna (#324) in Amawan CD block

- Location in Uttar Pradesh, India
- Coordinates: 26.291779°N 81.326221°E
- Country India: India
- State: Uttar Pradesh
- District: Raebareli

Area
  - Total: 7.771 km^{2} (3.000 sq mi)

Population (2011)
  - Total: 5,352
  - Density: 688.7/km^{2} (1,784/sq mi)

Languages
  - Official: Hindi
- Time zone: UTC+5:30 (IST)
- Vehicle registration: UP-33

Sidhauna is a village in Amawan block of Rae Bareli district, Uttar Pradesh, India. It is located 16 km from Raebareli, the district headquarters. As of 2011, its population is 5,352, in 953 households. It has one primary school and no healthcare facilities.

The 1961 census recorded Sidhauna as comprising 17 hamlets, with a total population of 2,176 people (1,171 male and 1,005 female), in 412 households and 382 physical houses. The area of the village was given as 1,972 acres and it had a medical practitioner at that point.

The 1981 census recorded Sidhauna as having a population of 2,713 people, in 517 households, and having an area of 777.02 hectares. The main staple foods were listed as wheat and rice.
