= Chak Pira Shah =

Chak Pira Shah Chak Pira Shāh
- Village
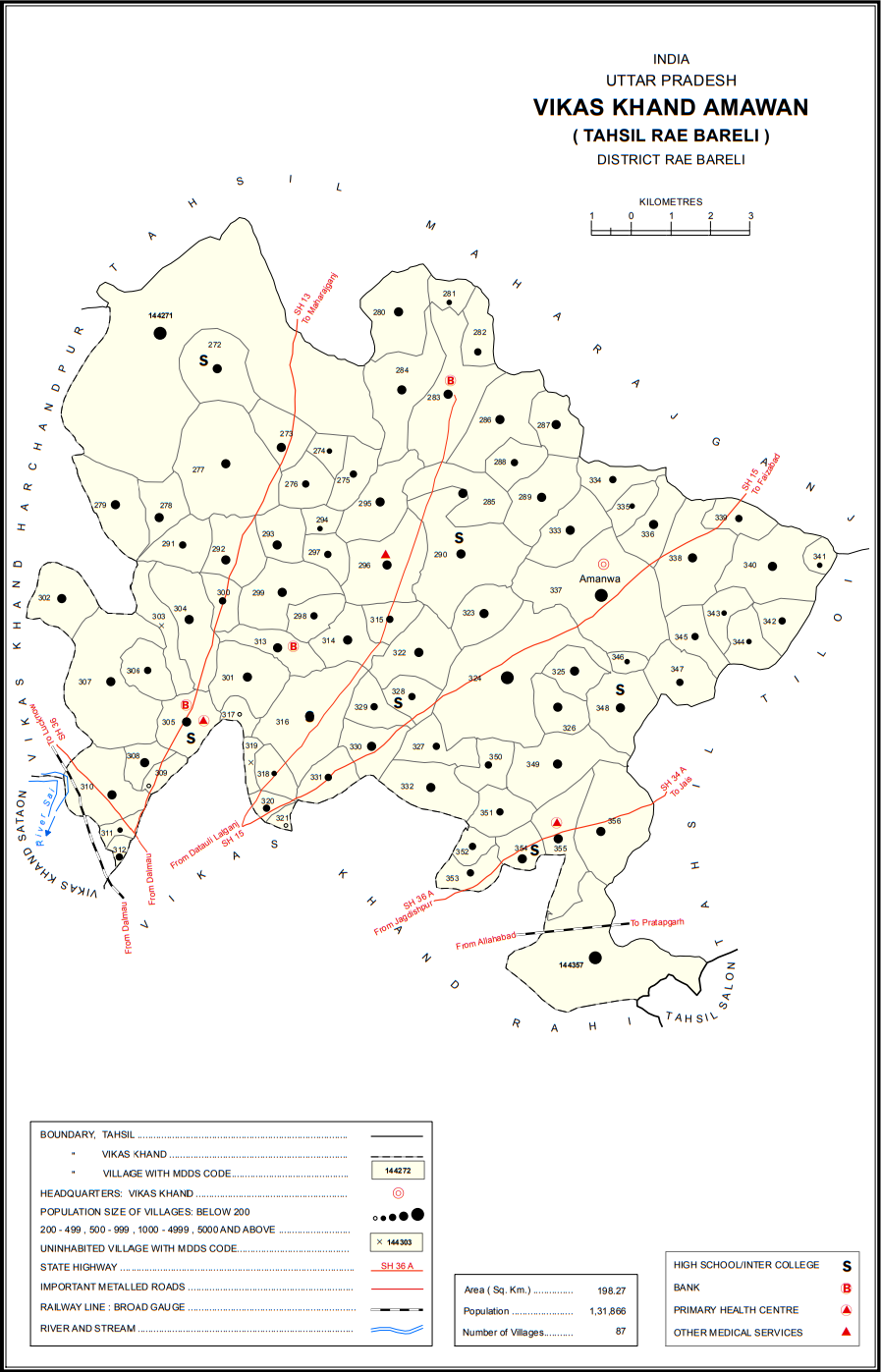
- Map showing Chak Pira Shah (#328) in Amawan CD block

- Location in Uttar Pradesh, India
- Coordinates: 26.286074°N 81.303904°E
- Country India: India
- State: Uttar Pradesh
- District: Raebareli

Area
  - Total: 1.004 km^{2} (0.388 sq mi)

Population (2011)
  - Total: 819
  - Density: 816/km^{2} (2,110/sq mi)

Languages
  - Official: Hindi
- Time zone: UTC+5:30 (IST)
- Vehicle registration: UP-35

Chak Pira Shah is a village in Amawan block of Rae Bareli district, Uttar Pradesh, India. It is located 11 km from Raebareli, the district headquarters. As of 2011, its population is 819, in 133 households. It has one primary school and no healthcare facilities.

The 1961 census recorded Chak Pira Shah (as "Chak Peer Shah") as comprising 3 hamlets, with a total population of 337 people (163 male and 174 female), in 66 households and 64 physical houses. The area of the village was given as 254 acres.

The 1981 census recorded Chak Pira Shah (as "Chak Perashah") as having a population of 508 people, in 113 households, and having an area of 98.75 hectares. The main staple foods were listed as wheat and rice.
