= Rupamau =

Rupamau Rūpāmau
- Village
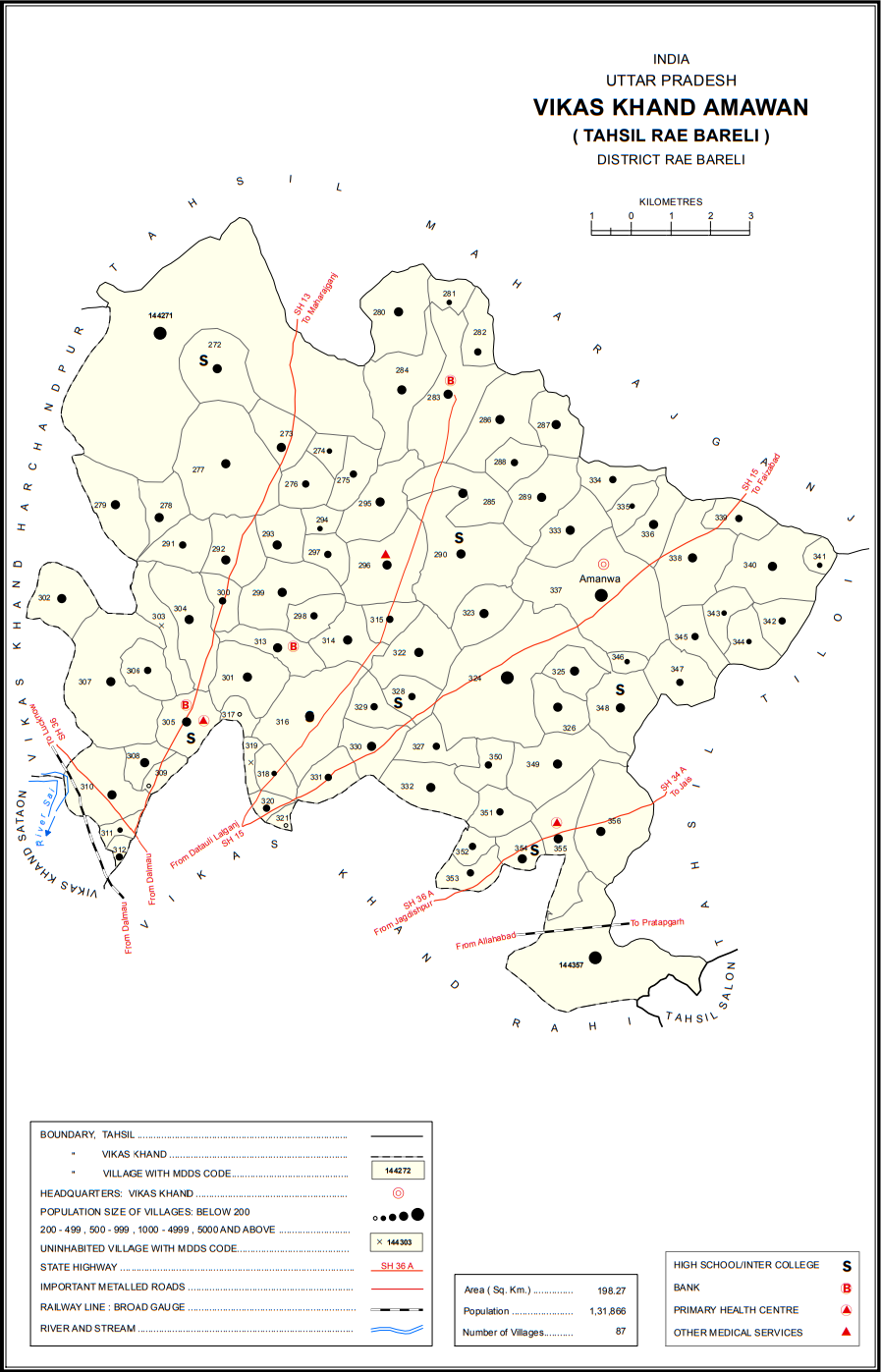
- Map showing Rupamau (#144357) in Amawan CD block

- Location in Uttar Pradesh, India
- Coordinates: 26.227415°N 81.346151°E
- Country India: India
- State: Uttar Pradesh
- District: Raebareli

Area
  - Total: 8.153 km^{2} (3.148 sq mi)

Population (2011)
  - Total: 6,098
  - Density: 747.9/km^{2} (1,937/sq mi)

Languages
  - Official: Hindi
- Time zone: UTC+5:30 (IST)
- Vehicle registration: UP-35

Rupamau is a village in Amawan block of Rae Bareli district, Uttar Pradesh, India. It is located 12 km from Raebareli, the district headquarters. As of 2011, its population is 6,098, in 1,053 households. It has 4 primary schools and no healthcare facilities.

The 1961 census recorded Rupamau as comprising 20 hamlets, with a total population of 2,372 people (1,204 male and 1,168 female), in 491 households and 467 physical houses. The area of the village was given as 1,940 acres and it had a post office at that point.

The 1981 census recorded Rupamau as having a population of 3,119 people, in 589 households, and having an area of 662.09 hectares. The main staple foods were listed as wheat and rice.
