= Parigawan =

Village in Uttar Pradesh, India

- Village
- Location in Uttar Pradesh, India
- Coordinates: 27.12969°N 79.08609°E
- Country: India
- State: Uttar Pradesh
- District: Mainpuri
- Tehsil: Bhongaon

Area
  - Total: 8.839 km^{2} (3.413 sq mi)

Population (2011)
  - Total: 3,299
  - Density: 373.2/km^{2} (966.7/sq mi)

Languages
  - Official: Hindi
- Time zone: UTC+5:30 (IST)
- Vehicle registration: UP-84
- Highways: Agra–Lucknow Expressway, National Highway 234 (India)

Parigawan (Parigāwān) is a town And Mandi in block Jagir of Mainpuri district, Uttar Pradesh, India. As of 2011, it had a total population of 5000 A Town Cover 5 km of Mainpuri city.

== Demographics ==
As of 2011, Parigawan had a population of 3,299, in 541 households. This population was 53.6% male (1,769) and 46.4% female (1,530). The 0-6 age group numbered 504 (298 male and 206 female), or 15.3% of the total population. 684 residents were members of Scheduled Castes, or 20.7% of the total.

The 1981 census recorded Parigawan (as "Parigaon") as having a population of 1,698 people, in 269 households.

The 1961 census recorded Parigawan as comprising 6 hamlets, with a total population of 1,178 people (619 male and 559 female), in 244 households and 154 physical houses. The area of the village was given as 2,224 acres.

== Infrastructure ==
As of 2011, Parigawan had 1 primary school and 1 primary health centre. Drinking water was provided by tap, well, hand pump, and tube well; there were no public toilets. The village had a post office but no public library; there was at least some access to electricity for all purposes. Streets were made of both kachcha and pakka materials.
