= Basti =

Basti may refer to:

== People ==
=== Surname ===
- Básti, a Hungarian surname

=== Given name ===
- Abderraouf El Basti (born 1947), Tunisian politician
- Basti Vaman Shenoy (born 1934), Indian Kolkani activist
- Yagi Basti (died c. 1344), a ruler of Shiraz, Iran
- Basti Vaman Shenoy, a noted Konkani Activist and Founder of World Konkani Centre in Mangalore (born 1934)
- Ryan Bastinac (born 1991), Australian rules footballer nicknamed "Basti"
- Basti, a variant of the male given name Sebastian

== Places ==
=== India ===
==== Uttar Pradesh ====
- Basti division
- Basti district part of Basti division
- Basti (Lok Sabha constituency)
- Basti, Uttar Pradesh, a city in Basti district
- Basti railway station, the main railway station of Basti district

=== Iran ===
- Basti, Iran, a village in Markazi Province, Iran

=== Nepal ===
- Basti, Nepal
- Nirmal Basti, a Village Development Committee in Parsa District in the Narayani Zone of southern Nepal

=== Pakistan ===
- Azam Basti, one of the neighbourhoods of Jamshed Town in Karachi, Sindh, Pakistan
- Basti Babbar, a town of Bahawalpur District in the Punjab province of eastern Pakistan
- Basti Dhandlah, a town of Bahawalpur District in the Punjab province of eastern Pakistan
- Basti Fauja, a town and Union Council of Dera Ghazi Khan District in the Punjab province of Pakistan
- Basti Malana, a town and Union Council of Dera Ghazi Khan District in the Punjab province of Pakistan
- Basti Maluk, town of Multan District, Punjab, Pakistan
- Basti-Abdullah, a town located near Rojhan and Kashmore
- Basti Mian Ahmed Din, a village in Tehsil Ahmed Pur Sial District, Jhang, Punjab, Pakistan
- Basti Nari, a town of Bahawalpur District in the Punjab province of eastern Pakistan
- Khuda Ki Basti (Karachi), one of the neighbourhoods of Gadap Town in Karachi, Sindh, Pakistan
- Noorani Basti, one of the neighbourhoods of Hyderabad, Sindh, Pakistan

=== Spain ===
- Basti, Granada, a Roman town

== Yoga ==
- Basti (Panchakarma), one of the kriya of Panchakarma cleansing of body according to Ayurveda
- Basti (Hatha Yoga), an important part of Shatkarma (sometimes known as Shatkriya), the yogic system of body cleansing techniques

== Other uses ==
- Basti or Basadi, a term used in some places for a Jain temple
- Basti (novel), an Urdu novel written by Intizar Hussain.
- Khuda Ki Basti (novel), an Urdu novel written by author Shaukat Siddiqui
- Al Basti, a tormenting feminine night-demon in Turkish folklore (Anatolia, Turkmenistan)
- Badnam Basti, a 1971 Bollywood drama film directed by Prem Kapoor
- Basti (film), a 2003 Indian crime film
- Bastian Schweinsteiger, German footballer
