= Oikonyms in West and South Asia =

Names of inhabited places in parts of Asia

Oikonyms in West, Central, and South Asia can be grouped according to various components, reflecting common linguistic and cultural histories. Toponymic study is not as extensive as it is for placenames in Europe and Anglophone parts of the world, but the origins of many placenames can be determined with a fair degree of certainty. One complexity to the study when discussing it in English is that the Romanization of names, during British rule and otherwise, from other languages has not been consistent.

== Names after natural features ==
In Rajasthan, names are frequently given after rock, stone, ravine, and embankment. In the Gangetic plain, the predominant natural features are trees, grass prairies, and bodies of water. Prominent trees, visible from a long way off, would often serve as landmarks and give their name to places before there was any permanent settlement there. This was especially the case where a large tree indicated a ford across a river; for example, the name Gaighāṭ indicates a ford next to an agai tree. Tree names are especially common in areas that were historically under dense forest cover until recent centuries.

== Common affixes ==
Common affixes used in South Asian oikonyms can be grouped based on their linguistic origin (with examples from India, Bangladesh, Pakistan, Nepal, and elsewhere such as in Sanskrit-influenced Indonesia):

=== Dravidian ===
==== wal, wali, wala, wara, wada, warree, vli, vadi, vali, pady and palli ====
Means hamlet — e.g. Dombivli; Kasan Wala; Sandhilianwali; Gujranwala; Chhindwara; Tiruchirappalli; Saraipali

==== Kot ====
Means "fort" — Pathankot; Sialkot

==== Patnam, patham, pattana ====
Means "city", or "city of" — e.g. Visakhapatnam'

=== Indo-Aryan ===
==== Alay ====
Means "abode"; from Sanskrit ā-laya. e.g. Meghalaya, Himalaya, Lokā-laya (settlement).

==== -aulī, -olī ====
These suffixes are very common, especially -aulī. In many cases, they are probably derived from Sanskrit palli, referring to a hamlet or small village. For example, Bārḍolī in Gujarat is attested in a Rashtrakuta-era inscription as Vāraḍapallikā. Names with these suffixes may also come from Sanskrit valli, meaning "section" or "part"; either origin is plausible.

At some point, it seems that -aulī became regarded as a distinct morpheme by itself, and apparently used independently as a suffix without being derived from an earlier form. For example, the names Shamsaulī and Shekhauliyā must have coined after the Muslim conquest to simply mean something like "Shams ud-Dīn's village".

The form -aulī also seems to have become standardised and absorbed similar forms by analogy. For example, Dubaulī (from Dūbe) is a common village name in eastern Uttar Pradesh, but it is not the regular, expected form of the name. The regular form would be Dubelī, which exists but is far less common. In most cases, the name was assimilated to -aulī by analogy with other places with names ending in -aulī.

==== Bāns ====
Means bamboo, from Sanskrit vaṃśa. It was historically common for villages to be surrounded by bamboo groves that were planted as a form of defence. In many cases, it can be hard to distinguish between places named with bāns from places named with bās ("dwelling"), since bās sometimes becomes nasalised and bāns sometimes becomes de-nasalised. Examples of places named with bāns are Bānsgāon and Bānsī.

==== Baṛ, Bargad, Vaḍ ====
The names baṛ and bargad both refer to the banyan tree, ultimately from Sanskrit vaṭa. This is a very common place name element; according to Sankalia, many towns and villages may have originally started out as temporary shelters underneath the wide canopy of a banyan tree. As they grew into more permanent settlements, they kept the name. Baṛ has the common variations baḍ and baṭ. Another variant is vaḍ, as in Vaḍodarā.

==== Basti ====
(बस्ती; بستی): A Hindi-Urdu word meaning "settlement", "habitation", "village", or "residential locality".

The word is derived from Sanskrit vasati, meaning "dwelling" or "abiding", and is therefore Indo-Aryan rather than Persian in origin.

It commonly occurs in South Asian place names, including Basti Maluk and Azam Basti. In contemporary usage, it can refer to a village, neighborhood, or urban residential settlement.

==== Chak ====
A common prefix, especially in eastern Uttar Pradesh. The Oxford Hindi-English Dictionary defines chak (चक) with several meanings, including "a piece of assigned or rent-free land"; "the detached or unconsolidated fields of a village"; and simply "a sub-division of land". It derives the term from Sanskrit chakra, meaning "circle". Whalley, on the other hand, preferred a derivation from Persian chak, noting that "Chak" is frequently followed by a Muslim name.

==== Desh ====
Means village, land, country; from Sanskrit देश (desa) for "space" — e.g. Bangladesh. In Indonesia it becomes Desa which is another Indonesian word for "village".

==== -ehrā ====
In many cases, this ending is probably a "worn-down" descendant of earlier -kheṛa ("village").

==== Gaṛh ====
Means fortress — Chandigarh, Ramgarh

==== Gaṛhī ====
According to Whalley, Gaṛhī when used as a prefix probably in most cases originally referred to a village surrounded by a ditch.

==== Maū, -mai ====
In many cases, the place name element Maū (or mai) may be derived from Sanskrit maryādā, meaning "shore" or "bank". This name is usually given to places by a river, stream, or jhil (for example, Ḍalmaū on the Gaṅgā). Examples of these names are Arghaṭmaū ("the bank or shore where the water-wheel is"), Bhainsmai ("shore where cattle or horses graze"), or Pathrāmai ("stony shore"). In other cases, maū is a contraction of mahuā: the mahua tree, Madhuca longifolia.

Some places have Maū as a standalone name (for example, Maū, Uttar Pradesh), while in other cases -maū is a suffix or even a prefix. The name Māwai is a variant of Maū.

==== Nagar ====
Means city, land, country, village; from Sanskrit नगर (nagara) — e.g. Ahmednagar, Biratnagar. In Indonesian, the word Negara means "country" and the word Nagari is a term used in West Sumatra referring to "village". Also used in Borneo island, e.g. Negara Brunei Darussalam

Many modern names using nagar in full are relatively recent origin; older names with nagar have often been shortened to nār or ner.

At least in northern India, nagar is not used as a prefix. Instead, the forms Naglā or, more rarely, Nagrā, are used. About 100 places also have the feminine forms Nagariyā and Nagariyā.

==== Nawādā ====
Apparently derived from Sanskrit nivāsa, "dwelling", combined with the Persian name Nauābād ("new settlement"). Nawādā, along with its feminine variant Nawādiyā, is a very common village name by itself, and it is also used as a prefix for other names.

==== -on ====
In many cases, this ending is probably a "worn-down" descendant of earlier -gāon ("village") or -ban ("forest").

==== -padra, -vadra, -darā ====
The Sanskrit term padra denoted a roadside village or residence (related to pad, meaning "foot"). Beginning around the 5th century, a regular sound change took place where /p/ became /v/ between vowels, turning this suffix into -vadra in many place names. In many modern place names, -vadra has further morphed into -darā. For example, Vaḍodarā is from an earlier attested form Vaṭapadra, Talodrā is from Talapadra or Talapadraka, and Lāṭhodrā is from Lāṭhivadra (attested in Chaulukya-era epigraphy). Similar names like Saḍodarā and Raṇodarā probably share the same origin, although their older forms are not directly attested.

==== Pahāṛ and Pahār ====
Pahāṛ, with the retroflex ṛ, means a hill, cliff, or overhanging river bank. Pahār with a non-retroflex r is a personal name, derived from Sanskrit prahāra. It can be hard to tell these place name elements apart because they can be easily confused in other scripts.

==== Paṭṭī ====
From Hindi paṭṭī, meaning "strip", itself derived from Sanskrit paṭṭikā. As a place name element, it is used in the sense of "a strip of land". In some cases it refers to a share of land held in joint tenure by a pattidar (literally "shareholder").

==== Pilkhu, Pilkhan, Pākaṛ, Pākhaṛ ====
These are all names for the pilkhan tree, one of several varieties of fig tree viewed as sacred in Hinduism. The forms pilkhu and pilkhan come from Sanskrit plakṣā, while pākaṛ and pākhaṛ come from Sanskrit #Sanskrit parkaṭī. One place with this name is Pilkhuwā.

==== Pind ====
literally "lump" or a small altar of sand

==== Pīpal ====
The pīpal tree, Ficus religiosa, is a common place name element.

==== Pur, Purī ====
Means village, town, state, country; from Sanskrit पुर (pura) — e.g. Jamalpur; Kanpur; Khanpur. In Southeast Asian and some south Asian countries, it is known as pura, e.g. Anuradhapura, Singapura, and Indonesian cities such as Jayapura, Siak Sri Indrapura, etc. In Indonesia, pura also refers to a Hindu temple.

In ancient times, the word pura strictly referred to a fort, but its meaning was gradually broadened to include any town regardless of its particular function. By the early medieval period, pura was often used to denote a commercial centre – especially in southern India, where the typical form was puram.

In many cases, old names originally ending in -pura have become shortened to -or over the centuries. In the case of Mangrol (originally Maṅgalapura), the suffix has become -rol instead.

The variant purā often originally referred to a suburb, or to a Muslim colony.

Pur is not used as a prefix. Instead, the form Purā is used. In west-central Uttar Pradesh, around Kanpur and Etawah, the prefix takes the form Purwā. Farther east, toward Basti, it takes the form Pure. The feminine form Purī is rarely found as a prefix.

==== Semal, semar, simra, sambal ====
Many places are named after the semal tree. There are many variations of this place name. One place with this name is Sambhal, where the form sambal ended up becoming aspirated.

==== -vāḍā ====
According to Sankalia, this suffix has two possible origins: from -pāṭaka, which originally designated "a large, but private house, or settlement within a village"; and -vāṭaka, which denoted "a temporarily enclosed place, such as a garden, plantation, or an enclosure of a (low caste) village consisting of boundary trees". The shortened form pāḍā appears early on in Ardhamāgadhī Prakrit, and in early Jain literature refers to a suburb of a larger town. In Gujarat, the present form -vāḍā first appears in inscriptions dating to the Chaulukya period. -Vāḍā continued to be used productively to form new place names; it would have been originally given to private settlements "characterised either by a personal name or a prominent physiographical feature". Modern names ending in -vāḍā are descended from either ancient names that originally ended in either -pāṭaka or -vāṭaka, or more recent names that originally ended in -vāḍā.

An example is Delvāḍā. This name is attested in a Maitraka inscription as Devakula-pāṭaka, which would have later been contracted to *Devalvāḍā and then Deülavāḍā (which is attested in a Chaulukya inscription) before finally reaching the present form.

In Maharasthra, the term vāḍā refers to a built-up area, with or without an enclosure, belonging to a private citizen.

==== -vasaṇa ====
From Sanskrit, meaning "dwelling" or "residence" (of either an individual or a group). This suffix is especially common in northern Gujarat. Some places, such as Jetalvasana, contain the entire suffix without any modification. Others, like Chadasana, Jhulasan, Lunasan, Nandasan, and Ranasan (all of which are mentioned in medieval inscriptions with the suffix -vasaṇa), have had the suffix modified to -saṇ(ā) or -san(ā) over time.

==== -wāṛī ====
From Sanskrit vāṭikā, meaning "orchard" or "garden". Commonly paired with tree names, e.g. Siswārī. Some examples with tribal names are also found; these are probably references to an individual person; examples are Bharwārī and Lodhwārī.

=== Persian ===
The following words and suffixes are of Persian or other Iranian origin and occur in place names across Iran, Central Asia, the Caucasus, and South Asia. Some entered South Asian naming traditions through Persian and Urdu.

==== Ābād, abat, and apat ====
(آباد): The Persian element -abad generally denotes a settlement, inhabited place, or town, often associated with the name of its founder, ruler, or principal inhabitants. It is widespread in Iranian and South Asian place names, including Hyderabad, Islamabad, Mirza Abad, Ashgabat, Leninabad, and Sardarabad.

Related forms include -abat and -apat, found in Armenian place names such as Vagharshapat and Sardarapat. The Armenian element -apat derives from Proto-Iranian *-āpāta-, meaning "protected (by)", which is also the source of Middle Persian and Parthian ābād.

The element does not necessarily indicate an urban settlement. Places containing -abad may range from small villages and isolated agricultural settlements to substantial towns and cities. See also abadi (settlement).

==== Bandar ====
(بندر): A Persian word meaning "harbor", "port", or "commercial town". It appears in numerous coastal place names, including Bandar Abbas, Bandar-e Anzali, and Bandar Lengeh. The word was also borrowed into several languages of South and Southeast Asia through maritime trade.

==== Dasht ====
(دشت): A Persian word meaning "plain", "open country", or, in some contexts, "desert". It occurs in place names such as Dasht-e Moghan, Dasht-e Kavir, and Hulandasht.

==== Kuy ====
(کوی): A Persian word meaning "neighborhood", "quarter", or "district". It occurs in Iranian place names such as Kordkuy.

==== Shahr or shehr ====
(شهر): A Persian word meaning "city" or "town", used independently or as an element in compound place names. It also entered several South Asian languages, including Urdu. Examples include Khorramshahr, Iranshahr, and Bulandshahr in India.

==== Ganj, gunj, and gunge ====
(گنج): A Persian word meaning "treasure" or "treasury". In South Asian place names, particularly in India and Bangladesh, it may designate a marketplace, commercial quarter, or neighborhood. Examples include Daryaganj in Delhi and Sunamganj in Bangladesh.

The word has a pre-Islamic Iranian origin and also occurs in place names such as Ganja in Azerbaijan.

==== Dera ====
A word used in Punjabi and other South Asian languages for a camp, dwelling, settlement, or group of farmhouses. According to the Encyclopaedia of Sikhism, the term is of Persian derivation and originally referred to a tent, camp, or abode.

Examples include Dera Ghazi Khan and Dera Ismail Khan in Pakistan.

==== -gerd, -gird, -kard, and -kert ====
These are related Iranian place-name elements associated with the root meaning "to make" or "to build". They generally designate a settlement or structure established by a particular person, often a ruler or founder.

Examples include Darabgerd, Dastagird, Dastjerd, Khosrowjerd, and Farhadgerd.

The Armenian suffix -kert is of Iranian origin, from *-kṛta-, meaning "made" or "constructed". It occurs in Armenian place names such as Stepanakert and Tigranakert, the latter meaning "founded by Tigran".

==== Qal'a, Qala, Qalat, Kale, and Qila ====
These are forms used in Arabic, Persian, Turkish, Urdu, and other regional languages for a fortress, castle, or fortified settlement.

The Arabic form is qalʿa (قلعة). Related forms occur widely in place names across the Middle East, the Caucasus, Anatolia, and South Asia.

Examples include Makhachkala and places named Qalat.

Although qalʿa is well established in Arabic and was transmitted into several neighboring languages, its ultimate etymology is debated. One proposed explanation connects it with Iranian forms such as Persian kalāt, meaning "fortress"; another derives it from an Arabic root.

Similar-looking elements in different languages do not necessarily share the same immediate linguistic origin.

==== -stan and -estan ====
(ستان): An Iranian suffix indicating a place, region, or land associated with a particular people, characteristic, or object. It may also denote a place where something is abundant.

The suffix occurs in numerous geographical names, including Afghanistan, Pakistan, Turkestan, Kurdistan, and Golestan.

In Persian, the suffix appears as -stan or -estan, depending on phonological and historical factors. Examples include būstān ("garden") and golestān ("rose garden").

=== Arabic-derived, via Persian ===
The following elements are of Arabic origin and occur in place names across the Islamic world and South Asia. Many entered South Asian administrative and geographical terminology through Persian and Urdu, sometimes acquiring meanings specific to local systems of landholding and taxation.

==== Ihtimalī and Ghair Ihtimalī ====
Derived from Arabic iḥtimāl, meaning "probability" or "possibility".

In historical South Asian revenue terminology, ihtimalī referred to flood-prone land along riverbanks or in low-lying areas. Ghair ihtimalī indicated land not normally subject to flooding during the rainy season.

These expressions were also used to distinguish settlements with otherwise identical names, such as Todarpur Ihtimali and Todarpur Ghair Ihtimali in the present-day Aligarh district of India.

==== Khās ====
Derived from Arabic khāṣṣ, meaning "special", "selected", or "exclusive".

In historical Indian land administration, the term referred to a place managed directly by the government or by a jagirdar, without intermediaries.

It could also distinguish two villages sharing the same name, with khās generally applied to the older or larger settlement.

Jamal Muhammad Siddiqi identified six places containing khās in their names in present-day Aligarh district. All six were founded by Rajput chiefs during the Mughal period and occupied prominent positions on elevated ground.

==== Mazar ====
(مزار): An Arabic-derived word meaning "place of visitation" or "shrine", commonly used for a tomb or religious sanctuary.

In geographical names, it usually refers to the burial place of a religious figure, saint, ruler, or other venerated individual. A prominent example is Mazar-i-Sharif in Afghanistan. See also Mazar (mausoleum).

==== Mazra or Majra ====
Derived from Arabic mazraʿ, originally referring to a cultivated field or agricultural holding.

In parts of India, majra denotes a hamlet or cluster of houses physically separated from, but historically subordinate to, a larger village.

Such settlements often developed because farmers established residences closer to their agricultural land. Some eventually became independent villages while retaining majra in their names.

==== Milk ====
Derived from Arabic milk, meaning "ownership", "possession", or "property".

In historical Indian revenue terminology, the term was used for certain lands held free of rent or revenue obligations. Such holdings were often associated with Muslim zamindars.

==== Munzabtah ====
Derived from the Perso-Arabic administrative term munzabt, meaning "confiscated" or "seized".

The village of Raipur Munzabtah in Aligarh district, for example, acquired its distinguishing name after the British government confiscated it following the participation of one of its landholders in the Indian Rebellion of 1857.

==== Mutafarriqat ====
From Arabic mutafarriqāt, literally meaning "miscellaneous" or "scattered items".

In historical Indian administration, the term designated a fiscal or administrative unit consisting of several geographically separated parcels of land.

Villages containing mutafarriqat in their names were generally associated with such administrative units.

==== Nisfi ====
Derived from Arabic niṣf, meaning "half".

In South Asian place names, the term commonly indicates a settlement formed through the division of an existing village or landed estate.

For example, the village of Marhauli Nisfi Ashrafabad in present-day Aligarh district was established from a half-share of Ashrafabad.

==== Raiyyat ====
From Arabic raʿiyya, meaning "subjects" or "people under authority", subsequently used in Persian and South Asian languages for peasants, tenants, and cultivators.

In some Indian place names, the term indicates a settlement inhabited by cultivators associated with a nearby landowner.

For example, Lalpur Raiyyatpur in Aligarh district probably originated as a settlement of peasants under the zamindar of nearby Lalpur.

==== Nahr ====
(نهر): An Arabic word meaning "river", "stream", or "watercourse". It occurs in the names of rivers, irrigation canals, and settlements, for example Nahr-e Mian.

==== Nahri ====
Derived from Arabic nahr, with a relational suffix, and used in South Asian place names to refer to an irrigation canal or a location associated with one.

== See also ==
- Place names in India, for a more in-depth explanation of various place names in India.

== Sources ==
- Blackie, Christina (1887). Geographical Etymology: A Dictionary of Place-names Giving Their Derivations (3rd ed.). John Murray.
- Siddiqi, Akhtar Husain; Bastian, Robert W. (1985). "Urban Place Names in Pakistan: A Reflection of Cultural Characteristics". Names. 29 (1): 65–84. OCLC 500207327.
- Siddiqi, Jamal Mohd (1982). Significance of technical terms in place names—a case-study of Aligarh District. Proceedings of the Indian History Congress. Vol. 43. pp. 332–341. JSTOR 44141245.
- Southworth, Franklin C. (1995). "Reconstructing social context from language: Indo-Aryan and Dravidian pre-history". In Erdosy, George (ed.). The Indo-Aryans of Ancient South Asia: Language, Material Culture and Ethnicity. Indian philology and South Asian studies. Vol. 1. Walter de Gruyter. ISBN 9783110144475. ISSN 0948-1923.
