= Sardarabad =

Sardarabad (Persian: سردارآباد) may refer to:

== Places ==
- Sardarabad, Chaharmahal and Bakhtiari, Iran
- Sardarabad, East Azerbaijan, Iran
- Sardarabad, Gilan, Iran
- Sardarabad, Hamadan, Iran
- Sardarabad, Razan, Hamadan Province, Iran
- Sardarabad, Kermanshah, Iran
- Sardarabad, Andika, Khuzestan Province, Iran
- Sardarabad, Shushtar, Khuzestan Province, Iran
- Sardarabad, Delfan, Lorestan Province, Iran
- Sardarabad, Khorramabad, Lorestan Province, Iran
- Sardarabad, Markazi, Iran
- Sardarabad, North Khorasan, Iran
- Sardarabad, West Azerbaijan, Iran
- Sardarabad Rural District, in Khuzestan Province, Iran

== Media ==
- Sardarabad (weekly), Armenian weekly published in Spanish and Armenian in Buenos Aires, Argentina

== See also ==
- Sardarapat (disambiguation), places in Armenia
