= Ganehar =

Village in Punjab, Pakistan

- Location within Pakistan
- Coordinates: 29.43°N 70.20°E
- Country: Pakistan
- Province: Punjab
- District: Bahawalpur
- Elevation: 148 m (486 ft)
- Time zone: UTC+5 (PST)

Ganehar is a town of Bahawalpur District in the Punjab province of eastern Pakistan. Neighbouring settlements include Faqirwali and Basti Babbar.
