= Muhammadgarh, Pakistan =

Village in Punjab, Pakistan

Muhammadgarh
- Location within Pakistan
- Coordinates: 29.39°N 70.25°E
- Country: Pakistan
- Province: Punjab
- District: Bahawalpur
- Elevation: 108 m (354 ft)
- Time zone: UTC+5 (PST)

Muhammadgarh is a town of Bahawalpur District in the Punjab province of eastern Pakistan. Neighbouring settlements include Faqirwali and Basti Nari.
