= Basti Dhandlah =

Village in Punjab, Pakistan

- Location within Pakistan
- Coordinates: 29.38°N 70.23°E
- Country: Pakistan
- Province: Punjab
- District: Bahawalpur
- Elevation: 110 m (360 ft)
- Time zone: UTC+5 (PST)

Basti Dhandlah is a town of Bahawalpur District in the Punjab province of eastern Pakistan. Neighbouring settlements include Basti Nari and Faqirwali.
