= Hadjian =

Hadjian is a surname. Notable people with the surname include:

- Bedros Hadjian (1933–2012), Syrian-Armenian writer, educator, and journalist
- Mina Hadjian (born 1975), Iranian-born Norwegian television presenter and radio personality
