= Najwaniwala =

- Location within Pakistan
- Coordinates: 29.41°N 70.24°E
- Country: Pakistan
- Province: Punjab
- District: Bahawalpur
- Elevation: 113 m (371 ft)
- Time zone: UTC+5 (PST)

Najwaniwala is a town of Bahawalpur District in the Punjab province of eastern Pakistan. Neighbouring settlements include Faqirwali and Dadwala.
