= Dadwala =

Village in Punjab, Pakistan

- Location within Pakistan
- Coordinates: 29°41′N 70°26′E
- Country: Pakistan
- Province: Punjab
- District: Bahawalpur
- Elevation: 111 m (364 ft)
- Time zone: UTC+5 (PST)

Dadwala is a town of Bahawalpur District in the Punjab province of eastern Pakistan. Neighbouring settlements include Faqirwali and Najwaniwala.
