= Basti (name) =

Basti is both a given name and a surname. Notable people with the name include:

- Abderraouf El Basti (born 1947), Tunisian politician
- Basti Vaman Shenoy (1934–2022), Indian Kolkani activist
- Yagi Basti (died c. 1344), a ruler of Shiraz, Iran

== See also ==
- Básti
