= Chak Rar =

Chak Rar Chak Rār
- Village
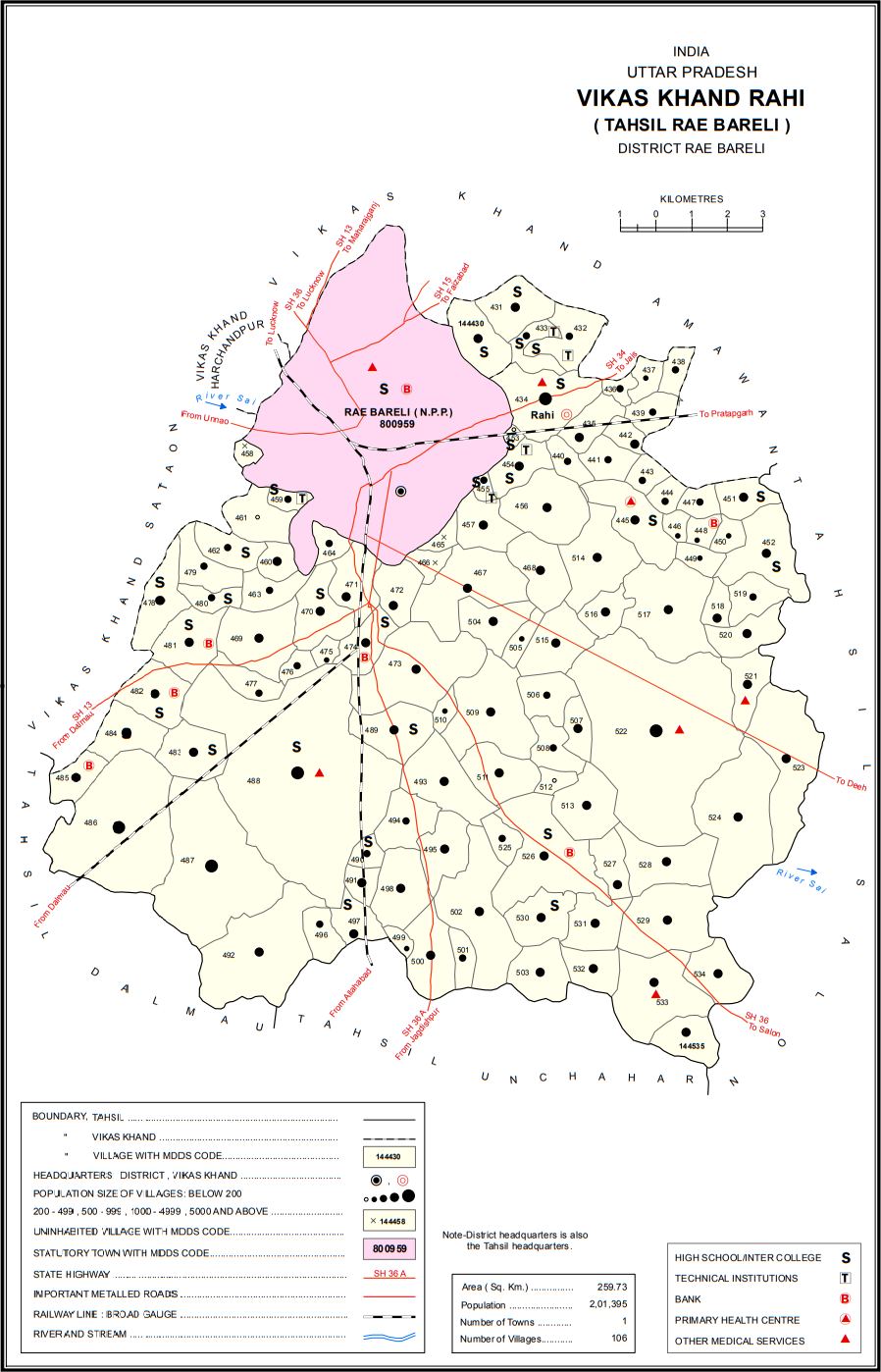
- Map showing Chak Rar (#520) in Rahi CD block

- Location in Uttar Pradesh, India
- Coordinates: 26.182614°N 81.35675°E
- Country: India
- State: Uttar Pradesh
- District: Raebareli

Area
  - Total: 1.484 km^{2} (0.573 sq mi)

Population (2011)
  - Total: 1,005
  - Density: 677.2/km^{2} (1,754/sq mi)

Languages
  - Official: Hindi
- Time zone: UTC+5:30 (IST)
- Vehicle registration: UP-35

Chak Rar is a village in Rahi block of Rae Bareli district, Uttar Pradesh, India. It is located 11 km from Rae Bareli, the district headquarters. As of 2011, it has a population of 1,005 people, in 182 households. It has one primary school and no medical facilities. The village hosts a weekly haat but not a permanent market. It belongs to the nyaya panchayat of Lodhwari.

The 1951 census recorded Chak Rar as comprising 3 hamlets, with a total population of 372 people (199 male and 173 female), in 85 households and 79 physical houses. The area of the village was given as 368 acres. 13 residents were literate, all male. The village was listed as belonging to the pargana of Rae Bareli South and the thana of Nasirabad.

The 1961 census recorded Chak Rar as comprising 3 hamlets, with a total population of 388 people (191 male and 197 female), in 93 households and 88 physical houses. The area of the village was given as 368 acres.

The 1981 census recorded Chak Rar (as "Chakrar", one word) as having a population of 577 people, in 103 households, and having an area of 148.93 hectares. The main staple foods were listed as wheat and rice.

The 1991 census recorded Chak Rar as having a total population of 705 people (372 male and 333 female), in 122 households and 122 physical houses. The area of the village was listed as 150 hectares. Members of the 0-6 age group numbered 159, or 22.5% of the total; this group was 54% male (86) and 46% female (73). Members of scheduled castes numbered 121, or 17% of the village's total population, while no members of scheduled tribes were recorded. The literacy rate of the village was 24.5% (146 men and 27 women). 192 people were classified as main workers (188 men and 4 women), while 136 people were classified as marginal workers (all women); the remaining 377 residents were non-workers. The breakdown of main workers by employment category was as follows: 107 cultivators (i.e. people who owned or leased their own land); 57 agricultural labourers (i.e. people who worked someone else's land in return for payment); 3 workers in livestock, forestry, fishing, hunting, plantations, orchards, etc.; 1 in mining and quarrying; 0 household industry workers; 4 workers employed in other manufacturing, processing, service, and repair roles; 6 construction workers; 2 employed in trade and commerce; 4 employed in transport, storage, and communications; and 8 in other services.
