= Armenian Argentines =

Ethnic group in Argentina

Հայերն Արգենտինայում (Armenian) Armenios en Argentina (Spanish)
- (Argentina) (Armenia)
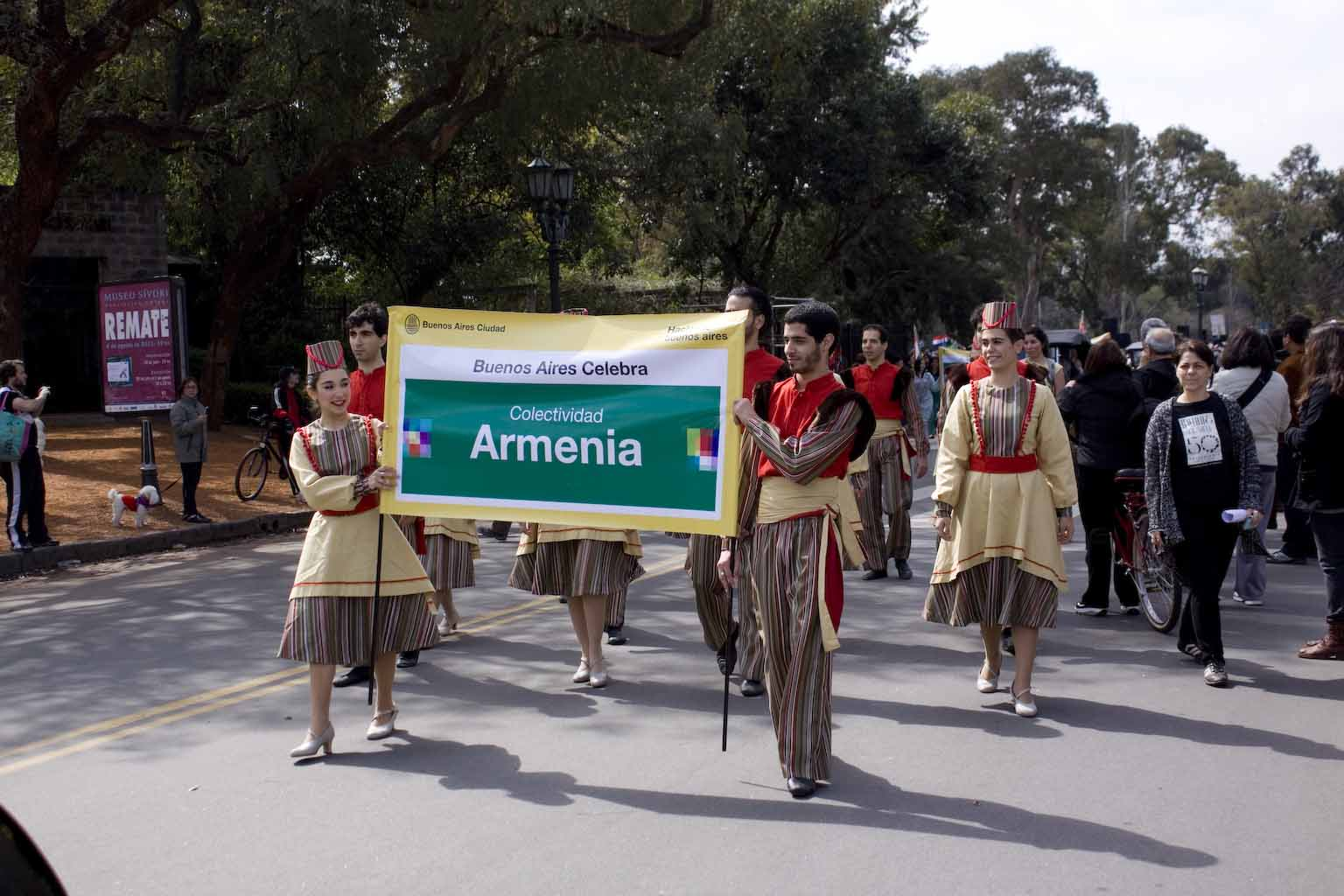
- Armenian Argentines during the Day of the immigrants in Buenos Aires.

Total population
- Unknown (by birth) + 165,000 (by ancestry); 0.5% of Argentina's population

Regions with significant populations
- Buenos Aires, smaller numbers in Córdoba, Mar del Plata, Berisso and Rosario

Languages
- Spanish · Armenian

Religion
- Majority: Oriental Orthodoxy; Minority: Catholicism · Protestant

Related ethnic groups
- Armenians · Armenian Brazilians · Armenian Uruguayans · Armenian Americans

Armenian Argentines (Armenian: Հայերն Արգենտինայում, romanized: Hayern Argentinayum; Spanish: Armenios en Argentina) are ethnic Armenians who live in Argentina. Estimates vary, but 165,000 people of Armenian ancestry live in the country, forming one of the largest groups in the Armenian diaspora worldwide. The core of the population came from Cilicia, Syria and Lebanon.

== History ==
Between 1909 and 1938, an estimated 10,000 Armenian refugees settled in Argentina. According to researcher Kim Hekimian, the majority of Armenians arriving in the early 20th century originated from the province of Adana in Cilicia of the Ottoman Empire. Most of these Armenians left their homelands because of the deportations and massacres of the Armenian genocide. Immigrants from the cities of Marash, Hadjin, and Antep together accounted for approximately 60 percents of all incoming Cilician Armenians. Often, the lengthy journey of the immigrants included a few months spent in places like Greece, Lebanon, or France. The large number of immigrants from these cities was a result of Armenians following their friends and relatives who had emigrated earlier. Armenians chose Argentina because of "a longstanding government policy which had opened the country's doors to foreign immigration well before the Armenians arrived. Since its declaration of independence in 1810, all Argentinean governments had not only encouraged immigration, but viewed the process as vital for national development and progress." Argentinean elites aimed to replace the old social structure they inherited from colonial society and eliminate the strict isolation enforced by the Spaniards.

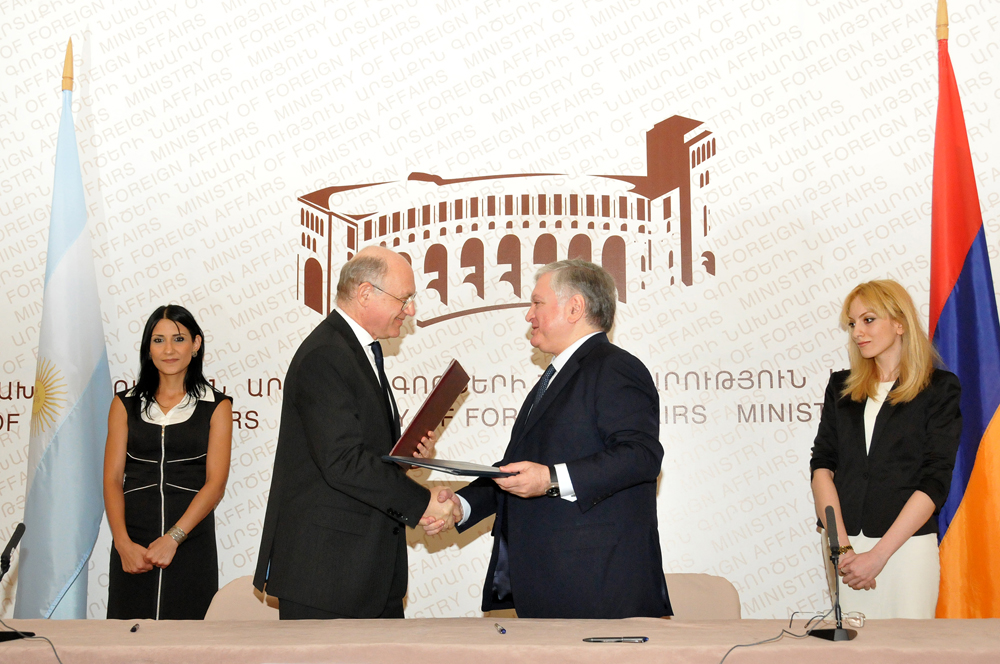
Foreign Minister Héctor Timerman with the Armenian Foreign Minister Eduard Nalbandyan.

Once in Argentina, Armenians from the same city or town in Cilicia were inclined to group together and maintain their regional customs. The informal census taken by Ohannes Der Jachadurian in 1941 demonstrates that approximately 70 percent of the Armenians in Argentina originating from Hadjin resided in the southern neighborhoods of Buenos Aires, including Flores, Nueva Pompeya, and Villa Soldati. Some of these regional ties promoted the creation of at least twenty organizations in the 1930s. Of these organizations, only the Society of Hadjin, Society of Antep and Society of Marash are still in operation. Around this same time, the Armenian General Benevolent Union established a strong presence in Buenos Aires; its first Latin American chapter was established in 1911 and became a social pillar in the community, establishing the first Armenian primary school, named Nabaryan.

In addition to the arrival of Armenians from Cilicia, between 1917 and 1921, during the Russian Civil War, many Armenians from Russia escaped to avoid religious persecution. Between 1947 and 1954 many Armenians from the Soviet Union, Syria and Lebanon came to Argentina as a consequence of the Second World War, and from Iran because of the Iranian Revolution in 1979. Another small wave of immigrants came in 1991 after Armenia declared independence from the Soviet Union. The transition from Soviet communism to a democratic republic hurt the economy, and many families did not know how to function without state support.

The Armenian community of Argentina has maintained its identity due to focus on the church, school and the family structure. Most of those who came in the mid-1920s escaped the Armenian genocide and Adana massacres. The first wave of Armenians came in 1908 and some came in 1915. This first group of immigrants held the first Armenian community mass in Buenos Aires, and South America in general, in 1912 and established the first parish organization of the Armenian Apostolic Church. It was not until 1924-1930 that the community took shape when some 10,000 people settled in Buenos Aires. Subsequent waves of immigrants came from Russia, Romania and Greece. The influx dried up in the early 1950s. As the Armenian community grew, they became increasingly prominent in the commerce industry. By the mid 20th century, "the Armenians controlled the manufacture of carpets, a third of the textiles, and a tenth part of the shoe production and of plastics." Several families, such as the Diarbekirians, were especially affluent, with some saying the family only fell short to Gulbenkian the oil king. However, the average Armenians in Argentina are middle-class businessmen, engaged in trade and business activities, involved in light and heavy manufacturing, agriculture, the service sector, and other spheres, there are also many civil servants, scientists, professors, doctors, lawyers, and artists.

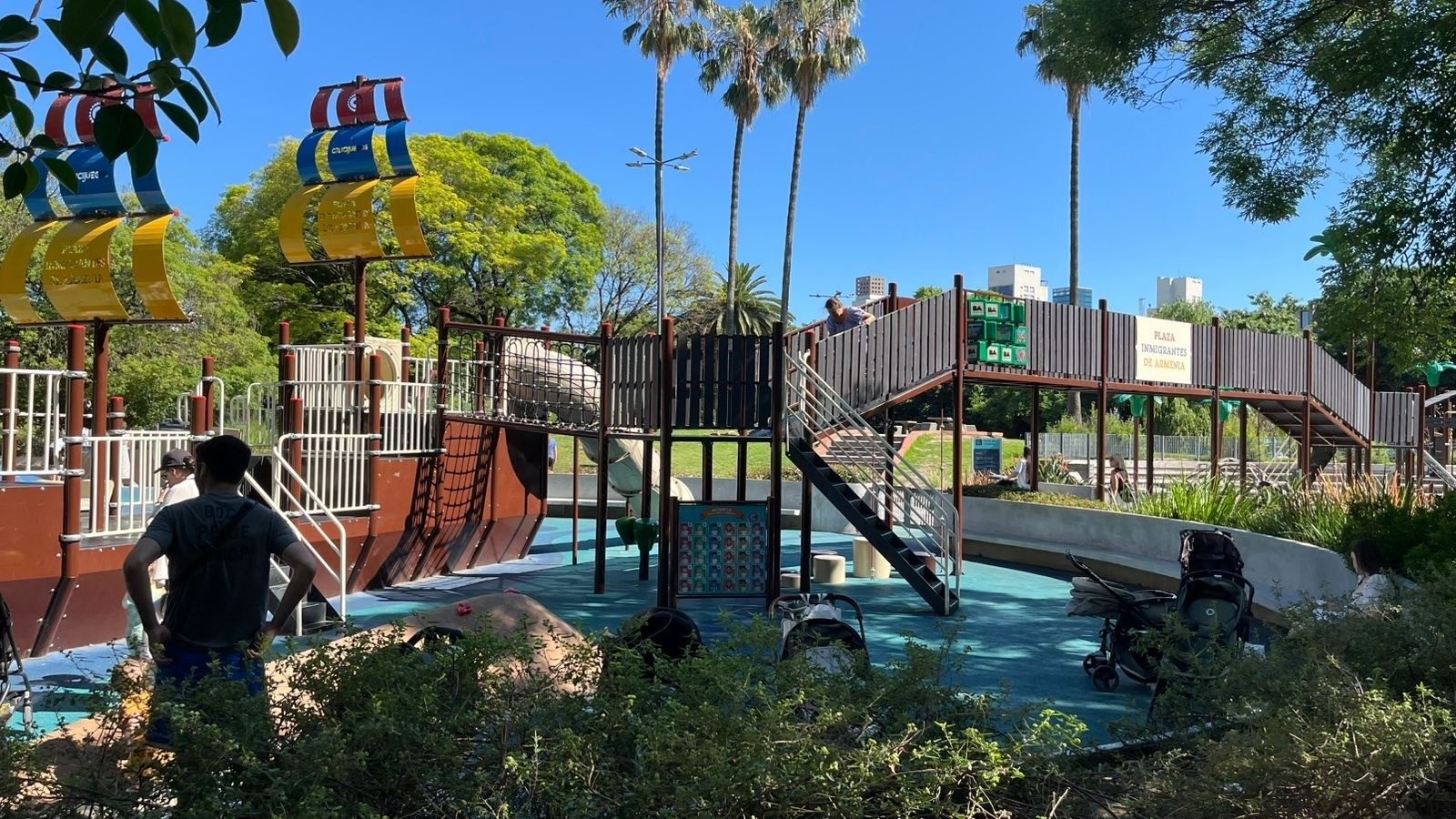
Plaza Armenia located in Buenos Aires, Argentina

Today, the community is estimated to number 80,000. While survival was of paramount importance, education was also high on the agenda of the early immigrants. They had no money and few of them spoke a foreign language, therefore they gave a great deal of attention to education. Much of the Armenian community of Buenos Aires can be found in the Palermo neighborhood. The Armenians presence in the neighborhood was officially recognized in 2014, when a park located between the streets Armenia, Costa Rica, Nicaragua, and Malabia, was officially renamed “Immigrants of Armenia”. Immigrants of Armenia, more commonly known as Plaza Armenia, is a social and cultural hub surrounded by cafes, boutiques, and murals. On the weekends the plaza is transformed into an artisanal fair, where you can find almost any jewelry, decor, or knick-knacks imaginable. The City of Buenos Aires dedicated the name of the park to Armenian refugees who arrived at the beginning of the 20th century, escaping from the genocide committed by the Turkish state between 1915 and 1923. The plaza features a 'sea' themed playground for children. The bridge between play structures is meant to emulate the immigrants' descent to South America and the yard space simulates the characteristics of their arrival.

== Religious life ==
All, if not most of the Armenian immigrants were Christian. 80% of Armenians belonged to the Armenian Church (which is independent of the Roman Catholic Church and the Orthodox). The rest followed the Armenian rite of the Catholic Church or belong to specifically Armenian Protestant churches. Prior to the establishment of the church, the Armenians of Buenos Aires congregated on Sunday afternoons at a coffee shop on 25 de Mayo Street which was owned by a Jewish man from Smyrna. The coffee shop became such an established "center" for the Armenians that they used its address to receive mail from their family and friends from abroad. When more Armenian refugees arrived in Buenos Aires, the community managed to rent the Cathedral of St John the Baptist, an Anglican church which was near the coffee shop. Two Englishmen delivered sermons translated from Armenian by Haig Moscofian.

After the arrival of the first priest of the community Der Hayr Barasatian, the community became more religiously organized. After the Armenian community in Buenos Aires faced numerous financial crises, it constructed its first Armenian church in 1938.

Currently, the Armenian community of Argentina has nine Armenian churches.

== Notable Armenian Argentines ==
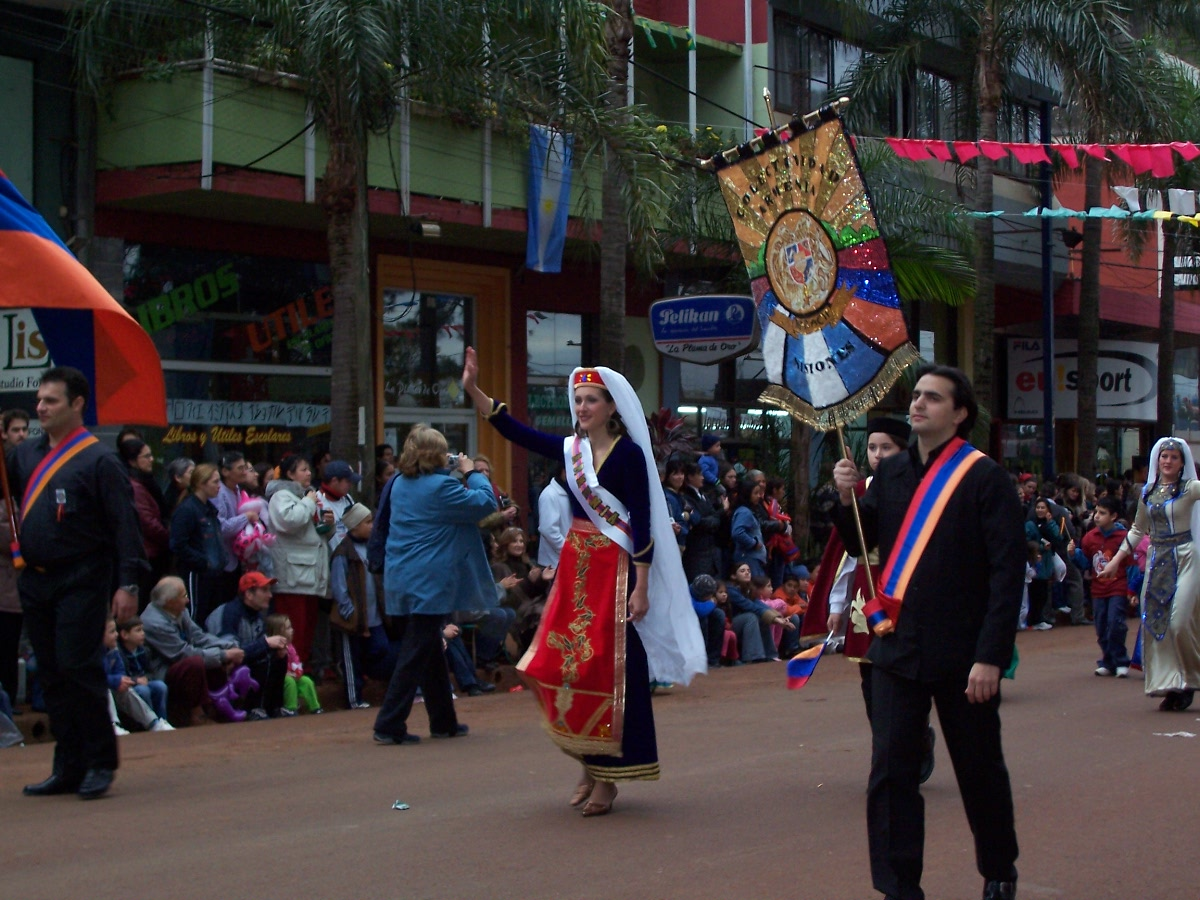
Armenian Argentines in the Immigrant's Festival.

- Martín Adjemián, actor
- León Arslanián, former Federal Judge and former Minister of Security of the Buenos Aires Province
- Esteban Becker, football coach
- José Andrés Bilibio, professional footballer
- Norberto Briasco, professional footballer
- Lucas Zelarayán, professional footballer
- Efrain Chacurian, former professional footballer
- János Czetz, a military commander during the Hungarian Revolution of 1848, and the organizer of Argentina's first national military academy
- Eduardo Eurnekian, businessman
- Pampero Firpo, professional wrestler
- Alicia Ghiragossian, poet and translator
- Bedros Hadjian, journalist, writer and educator
- Martín Karadagian, wrestler and actor
- Paz Lenchantin, bass player
- David Nalbandian, tennis player
- Alicia Terzian, conductor, musicologist and composer
- Paola Vessvessian, congresswoman
- Alex Yemenidjian, the former President of MGM
- Fernando Zagharian, professional footballer

== See also ==
- Argentina–Armenia relations
- Armenian diaspora
- Centro Armenio de la República Argentina
- Club Deportivo Armenio
- Sardarabad (weekly)
