= Khosa, Punjab =

Head Rajkan
- Location within Pakistan
- Coordinates: 29°39′50″N 70°25′20″E
- Country: Pakistan
- Province: Punjab
- District: Bahawalpur
- Time zone: UTC+5 (PST)

Khosa is a town of Bahawalpur District in the Punjab province of eastern Pakistan. Neighbouring settlements include Faqirwali and Basti Nari.
