= Pull Dawa =

Human settlement in Pakistan

Pull Dawa is a small town near the relatively bigger town of Basti Maluk in Multan district of Punjab, Pakistan.
