= Dubauli =

Dubaulī is the name of several places in India. It is derived from the name of Dūbe subgroup of Brahmins, along with the common suffix -aulī (which has multiple possible etymologies, including Sanskrit palli, meaning "small village or hamlet"). Dubaulī is actually an irregular form of the name – the expected form would be Dubelī, which exists but is far less common. The form Dubaulī is influenced by analogy with the many other place names ending in -aulī.

Places named Dubaulī include:

- Dubauli, Bihiya, a village in Bhojpur district, Bihar
- Dubauli, Garhani, a village in Bhojpur district, Bihar
- Dighwa Dubauli, a village in Gopalganj district, Bihar

== See also ==
- Oikonyms in Western and South Asia
