= Intizar Hussain =

Writer and novelist (1925–2016)

- انتظار حسین
- Born: 21 December 1925; Dibai, Bulandshahr district, British India
- Died: 2 February 2016 (aged 90); Lahore, Punjab, Pakistan
- Education: Meerut College
- Occupations: Writer, novelist
- Writing career
- Language: Urdu
- Years active: 1940s – 2016
- Notable awards: Sitara-i-Imtiaz; Pride of Performance Award by the President of Pakistan in 1986; Adamjee Literary Award; Kamal-i-Fun (Lifetime Achievement) award Sahitya Akademi Fellowship (National Academy of Letters) of India awarded in 2007; Anjuman Farogh-i-Adab Doha's award

Intizar Hussain or Intezar Hussain (Urdu: انتظار حسین; 21 December 1925 – 2 February 2016) was a Pakistani writer of Urdu novels, short stories, poetry and nonfiction. He is widely recognised as a leading literary figure of Pakistan.

He was nominated for the International Booker Prize in 2013.

== Early life ==
Intizar Hussain was born on 21 December 1925 in Bulandshahr district, Uttar Pradesh (at the time, the United Provinces of Agra and Oudh), British India. He received a degree in Urdu literature in Meerut. As someone born in the Indian subcontinent who later migrated to Pakistan during the 1947 Partition, a perennial theme in Hussain's works deals with the nostalgia linked with his life in the pre-partition era. Intizar Husain was often described as possibly the greatest living Urdu writer.

He lived in the old Anarkali Bazaar of Lahore, where he associated and socialized with the likes of Nasir Kazmi, and Muhammad Hasan Askari and together they frequented Lahore's teahouses – Pak Tea House, Nagina Bakery, Coffee House, Lords and Arab Hotel.

Lahore's literary scene was divided between two groups, Anjuman-e-Tarraqi-Pasand-Mussannifeen (Progressive Writers Movement) (a leftwing group) and the rightwing Halqa-e Arbab-e Zauq in the 1950s. Intizar Hussain decided not to be closely associated with either group and managed to stay neutral and focus on his writing career.

== Literary work ==
He wrote short stories, novels and poetry in Urdu, and also literary columns for newspapers such as Dawn and Daily Express. The Seventh Door, Leaves and Basti are among English translations of his books.

Among the five novels he wrote – Chaand Gehan (1952), Din Aur Daastaan (1959), Basti (1980), Tazkira (1987), and Aage Samandar Hai (1995) – received global praise.

His other writings include Hindustan Se Aakhri Khat, Aagay Sumandar Hai, Shehr-e-Afsos, Jataka Tales, Janam Kahanian and Wo Jo Kho Gaye. Aagay Sumandar Hai (Sea is facing you in the front) contrasts the spiraling urban violence of contemporary Karachi with a vision of the lost Islamic realm of al-Andalus in modern Spain.

His novel Basti is based on Pakistani history.

Among his books, "Basti" and "Khali Pinjra" have been translated into Persian by Samira Gilani.

== Death ==
On 2 February 2016, he died at National Hospital, Defence Housing Authority at Lahore after contracting pneumonia. The Indian Express newspaper termed him the "best-known Pakistani writer in the world" after Manto.

His wife, Aliya Begum, had died in 2004 and they had no children.

== Influences ==
Hussain believed that two forces had risen in contemporary Pakistan: women and the mullahs. He also acknowledged his study and the influence of Buddhist texts and the Mahabharata.

== Legacy ==
In 2016, Pakistan Academy of Letters (PAL) announced the ‘Intizar Hussain Award’ which would be given to a literary figure every year.

== Awards and international recognition ==
- Pride of Performance Award by the President of Pakistan in 1986.
- Kamal-e-Fun (Lifetime Achievement) Award by the Pakistan Academy of Letters in 1998.
- In 2007, Hussain received the Pakistani civil award Sitara-i-Imtiaz (Star of Excellence) by the President of Pakistan.
- Sahitya Akademi Fellowship (National Academy of Letters) of India awarded in 2007.
- In 2013, he was shortlisted for the Man Booker International Prize after Frances W. Pritchett translated his Urdu novel Basti into English.
- He received a lifetime achievement award at the Lahore Literary Festival. Newsweek Pakistan called him "Pakistan's most accomplished living author" in 2014.
- Hussain was made an Officer of the Ordre des Arts et des Lettres by the French government in 2014
- He was also the first ever winner of the prestigious Premchand Fellowship awarded by Sahitya Akademi of India in 2007.

== Bibliography ==
- A Chronicle of the Peacocks: Stories of Partition, Exile and Lost Memories
- The Death of Sheherzad
- Basti (1979) (Town)
- Aagay Samandar Hai (Beyond is the Sea) (1995)
- Chiraghon Ka Dhuvan (Lamp Smoke) (memoir) (1999)
- Chaand Gahan (2002)
- Ajmal-I Azam (2003)
- Circle and Other Stories (2004)
- Surakh Tamgha (2007)
- Qissa Kahanian (2011)
- Justujoo Kya Hai (autobiography) (2012)
- Apni Danist Mein (2014)
