= Sardarabad, Andika =

Sardarabad سرداراباد
- Village
- Location within Iran
- Coordinates: 32°16′07″N 49°35′51″E
- Country: Iran
- Province: Khuzestan
- County: Andika
- Bakhsh: Central
- Rural District: Shalal and Dasht-e Gol

Population (2006)
  - Total: 41
- Time zone: UTC+3:30 (IRST)
  - Summer (DST): UTC+4:30 (IRDT)

Sardarabad (Persian: سرداراباد, also Romanized as Sardārābād) is a village in Shalal and Dasht-e Gol Rural District, in the Central District of Andika County, Khuzestan Province, Iran. At the 2006 census, its population was 41, in 7 families.
