= Sardarabad, Chaharmahal and Bakhtiari =

Sardarabad سرداراباد
- Village
- Location within Iran
- Coordinates: 32°26′21″N 50°19′38″E
- Country: Iran
- Province: Chaharmahal and Bakhtiari
- County: Kuhrang
- Bakhsh: Central
- Rural District: Dasht-e Zarrin

Population (2006)
  - Total: 83
- Time zone: UTC+3:30 (IRST)
  - Summer (DST): UTC+4:30 (IRDT)

Sardarabad (Persian: سرداراباد, also Romanized as Sardārābād) is a village in Dasht-e Zarrin Rural District, in the Central District of Kuhrang County, Chaharmahal and Bakhtiari Province, Iran. At the 2006 census, its population was 83, in 11 families. The village is populated by Lurs.
