= Sardarapat =

Sardarapat may refer to:

== Places ==
- Armavir, Armenia, Armenian city, until 1932 known as Sardarapat or Sardar-Apad
- Sardarapat, Armenia, major village in Armavir Province, Armenia
- Sardarabad (fortress), a 19th-century fortress, now destroyed, located near the village of Nor Armavir
- Battle of Sardarabad (or Sardarapat), a battle of the Caucasus Campaign of World War I that took place near Sardarabad (modern-day Armavir), Armenia from May 21–29, 1918
  - Sardarapat Memorial, Armenian memorial complex dedicated to the Battle of Sardarapat above
- Sardarapat Movement, Armenian social movement founded in 2009
- Sardarapat FC, an Armenian Football Club that participates in the Armenian Premier League by winning the FFA First League (Armenian equivalent of the EFL Championship). The home Stadium is the Hakob Tonoyan Stadium in Armavir, Armenia.

== Media ==
- Sardarabad (weekly), an Armenian weekly published in Spanish and Armenian in Buenos, Aires, Argentina

== See also ==
- Sardarabad (disambiguation)
