= Argentina–Armenia relations =

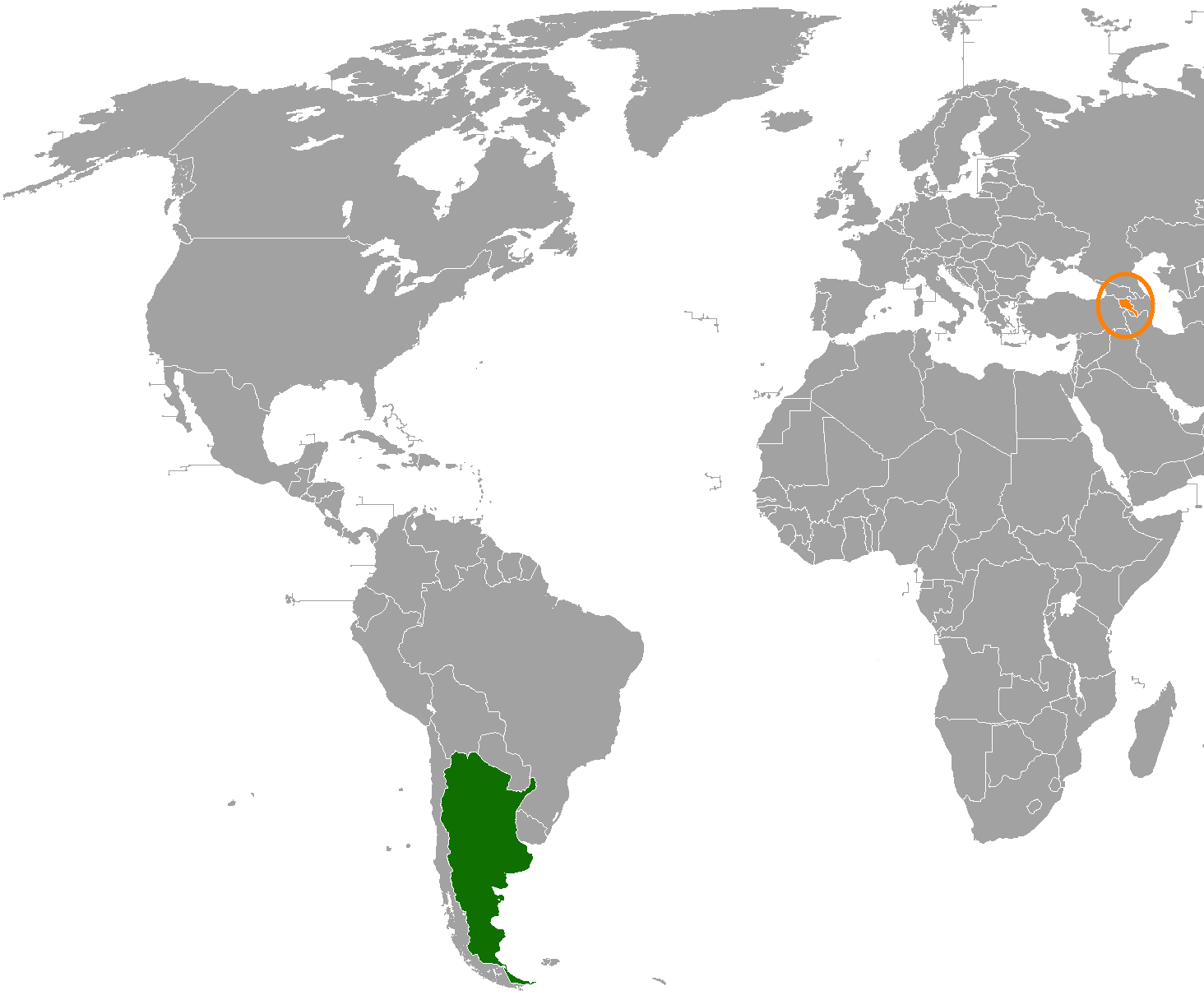

- Argentina: Armenia

The Armenian community in Argentina is the largest in Latin America totaling approximately 120,000 members.

== History ==
The first wave of Armenian migrants to arrive in Argentina was in 1892, mainly from Egypt and Syria. During World War I, several thousand Armenian migrants arrived to Argentina. Many were survivors of the Armenian genocide inflicted by the Ottoman Empire. In May 1918, Armenia declared its independence from the Russian Empire and established the First Republic of Armenia. In 1920, Argentina recognized the independence of Armenia and diplomatic relations were established between both nations. By December 1920, Armenia had been invaded by the Red Army and the country was incorporated into the Soviet Union.

On 26 December 1991, Armenia regained independence after the Dissolution of the Soviet Union. On 17 January 1992 Argentina and Armenia re-established diplomatic relations. In June 1992, Armenian President Levon Ter-Petrosyan paid an official visit to Argentina. In 1993, Armenia opened an embassy in Buenos Aires. In 1998, Argentine President Carlos Menem paid an official visit to Armenia. In 2009, Argentina opened its embassy in Armenia.

=== Armenian genocide recognition ===
In September 1987, Argentine President Raúl Alfonsín gave a speech to the Armenian community of Argentina stating that he recognized the Armenian genocide. In 1995, President Carlos Menem vetoed a law that would have recognized the Armenian genocide. On 11 January 2007, President Néstor Kirchner signed a law (26.199) stating that Argentina officially recognized the Armenian genocide.

== High-level visits ==
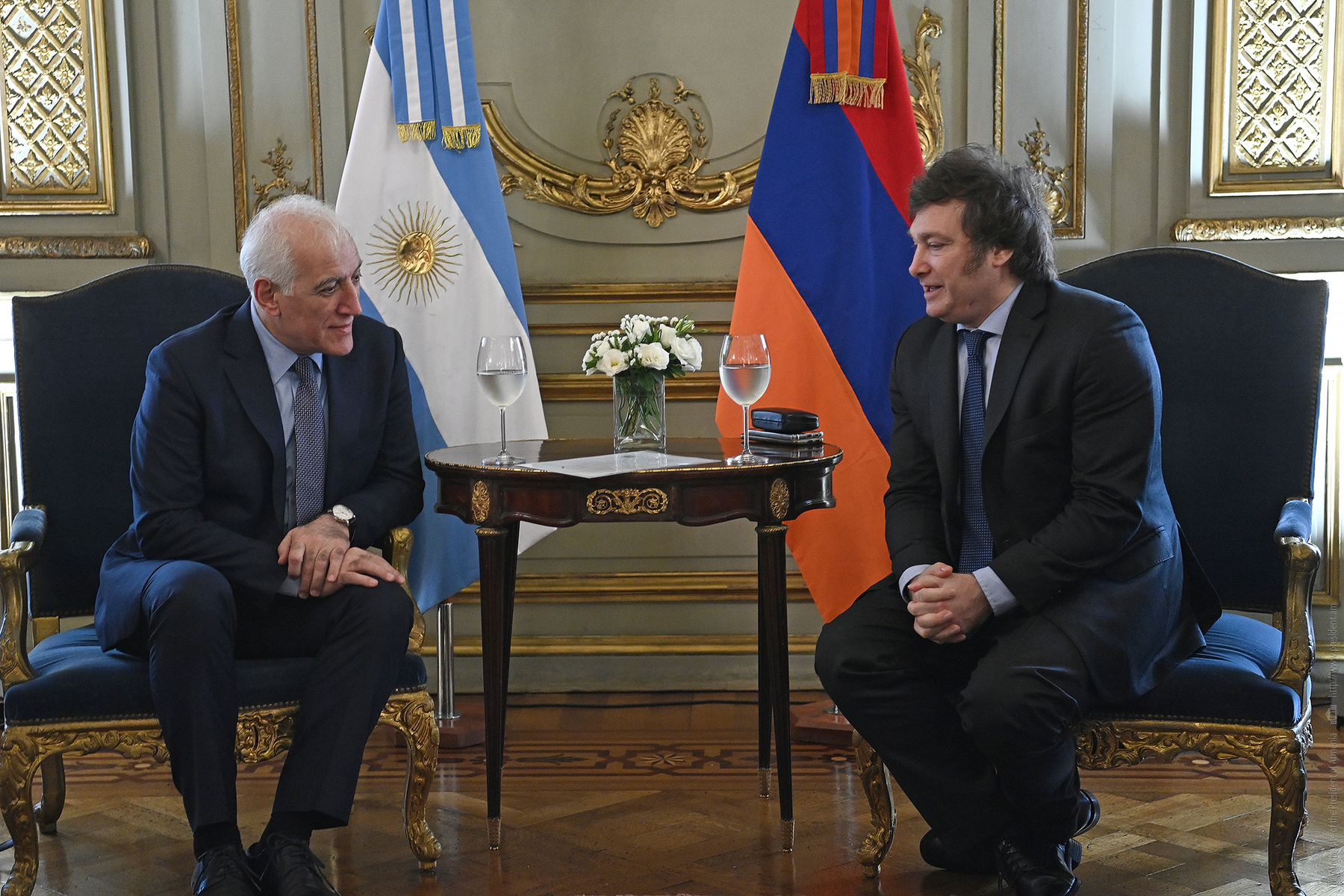
President Javier Milei and President Vahagn Khachaturyan on December 10, 2023 in Buenos Aires

High-level visits from Argentina to Armenia

- President Carlos Menem (1998)
- Foreign Minister Rafael Bielsa (2005)
- Foreign Minister Jorge Taiana (2010)
- Foreign Minister Héctor Timerman (2012)
- Vice President Amado Boudou (2013)

High-level visits from Armenia to Argentina

- Foreign Minister Raffi Hovannisian (1991)
- President Levon Ter-Petrosyan (1992)
- Foreign Minister Vahan Papazian (1994)
- Foreign Minister Vartan Oskanian (2000)
- President Robert Kocharyan (2002)
- Foreign Minister Eduard Nalbandyan (2011)
- President Serzh Sargsyan (2014)
- President Vahagn Khachaturyan (2023, 2025)
- Foreign Minister Ararat Mirzoyan (2024)

== Bilateral relations ==
Argentina and Armenia have signed numerous bilateral agreements since the re-establishment of diplomatic relations between both nations in 1992, such as an Agreement on Cooperation between both nations (1992); Agreement on the Promotion and Reciprocal Protection of Investments (1993); Agreement on trade and economic cooperation (1994); Agreement on science and technology cooperation (1994); Agreement on cooperation in the peaceful uses of nuclear energy (1998); Agreement on cooperation in the field of culture and education (1998); Agreement on cooperation in the field of tourism (2002); Agreement on Eliminating the Visa Requirement for Regular Passport Holders (2011); Agreement on a working holiday program (2014) and an Agreement on economic cooperation (2014).

== Trade ==
In 2018, trade between Argentina and Armenia totaled US$9.2 million. Argentina's main exports to Armenia include: meat, sugar and tobacco. Armenia's main exports to Argentina include: Knitted fabric and clothing. Argentina is Armenia's fifth largest foreign investor.

== Resident diplomatic missions ==
- Argentina has an embassy in Yerevan.
- Armenia has an embassy in Buenos Aires.

== See also ==
- Armenian Argentine
- Armenian genocide recognition
- Deportivo Armenio
- Foreign relations of Argentina
- Foreign relations of Armenia
