= Leninabad =

Leninabad may refer to:

== Azerbaijan ==
- Kərimbəyli, Babek
- Sanqalan
- Təklə, Gobustan
- Yeni yol, Shamkir

== Tajikistan ==
- Khujand
- Sughd Province
