= Alicia Ghiragossian =

Armenian-Argentine poet

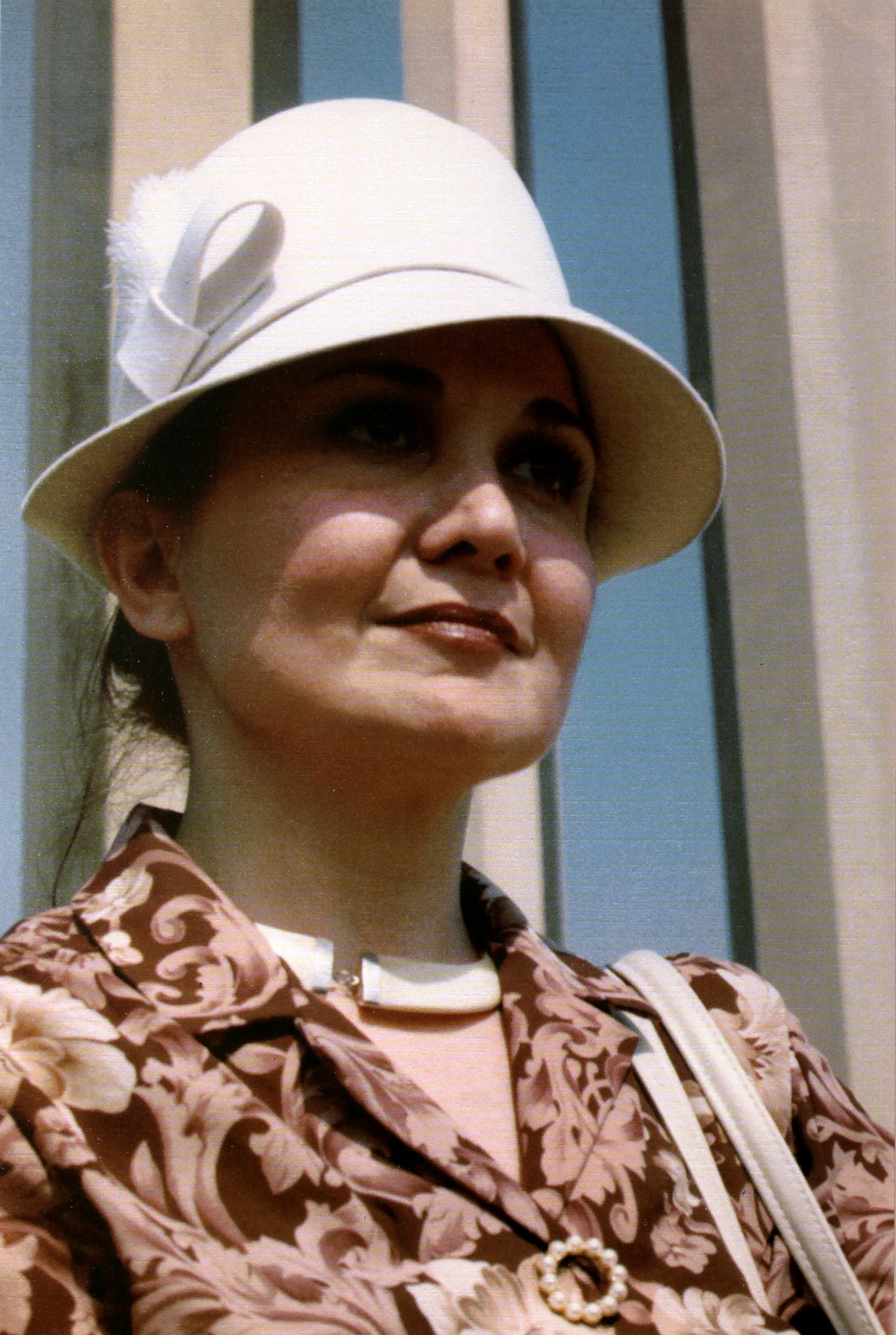
- Born: 13 July 1937; Córdoba, Argentina
- Died: 22 May 2014 (aged 77); Los Angeles, California
- Education: University of Buenos Aires
- Writing career
- Genre: Poetry

Alicia Ghiragossian (13 July 1936 – 22 May 2014) was an Armenian-Argentine poet and translator. Born in Argentina as the daughter of Armenian parents, she began publishing poetry in the late 1960s before settling in Los Angeles in 1971. Writing in three languages (Spanish, English and Armenian) she was the author of more than 60 books, including (Being and Punctuation), which was illustrated by the Spanish artist Pablo Picasso. Her work has been recognised with a nomination for the 1997 Nobel Prize in Literature.

== Life ==
Alicia Ghiragossian was born in 1936, the daughter of Armenian parents in Córdoba, Argentina. Her parents had emigrated to Argentina after the Armenian genocide in the Ottoman Empire. She obtained a law degree from the University of Buenos Aires and began practicing as a lawyer, but abandoned the profession to pursue a publishing career. She moved to Los Angeles in 1971 where she resided until her death in 2014. She had a daughter named Lara.

== Career ==
In 1967, Ghiragossian published a collection of poetry (Being and Punctuation), having published her first book the previous year. The collection was translated into Italian and illustrated by the Spanish artist Pablo Picasso. The same year, an edition of her poems (Roots and Essence) was translated into Armenian, and became a bestseller in Armenia and among the Armenian diaspora. Writing in Spanish, English, and Armenian, she went on to publish more than 60 books, most of which are poetry collections. She also translated an edition of the Armenian poet Raffi into Spanish.

Ghiragossian has been variously recognised for her poetry. She was nominated for the 1997 Nobel Prize in Literature; the award was later given to the Italian playwright Dario Fo. In the same year, she was made an honorary citizen of Armenia, while the Armenian National Academy of Sciences awarded her an honorary doctorate.

== Sources ==
- Simonian Kalaidjian, Azadouhi (1997). "Alicia Ghiragossian: the trilingual poet". Al-Raida. 14: 44–5. Archived from the original on November 5, 2020.
