= Ilyasabad =

Pakistani town

Coordinates: 25°23′43.4″N 68°22′31.1″E

Ilyasabad الياس آباد
- Town
- Interactive map of Ilyasabad
- Country: Pakistan
- Province: Sindh
- City: Hyderabad
- Time zone: UTC+5 (PST)

Ilyasabad (Urdu: الياس آباد) is a town in the southern suburbs of the city of Hyderabad, in Sindh, Pakistan.

== See also ==
- Latifabad
- Noorani Basti
- Hyderabad
