= Sardarabad, East Azerbaijan =

Sardarabad سرداراباد
- Village
- Location within Iran
- Coordinates: 39°03′00″N 47°21′16″E
- Country: Iran
- Province: East Azerbaijan
- County: Kaleybar
- Bakhsh: Abish Ahmad
- Rural District: Abish Ahmad

Population (2006)
  - Total: 429
- Time zone: UTC+3:30 (IRST)
  - Summer (DST): UTC+4:30 (IRDT)

Sardarabad (Persian: سرداراباد, also Romanized as Sardārābād) is a village in Abish Ahmad Rural District, Abish Ahmad District, Kaleybar County, East Azerbaijan Province, Iran. At the 2006 census, its population was 429, in 82 families. The village is populated by the Kurdish Chalabianlu tribe.
