= Sardarabad, Gilan =

Sardarabad سرداراباد
- Village
- Location within Iran
- Coordinates: 37°06′55″N 49°44′47″E
- Country: Iran
- Province: Gilan
- County: Siahkal
- Bakhsh: Central
- Rural District: Khara Rud

Population (2006)
  - Total: 166
- Time zone: UTC+3:30 (IRST)
  - Summer (DST): UTC+4:30 (IRDT)

Sardarabad (Persian: سرداراباد, also Romanized as Sardārābād) is a village in Khara Rud Rural District, in the Central District of Siahkal County, Gilan Province, Iran. At the 2006 census, its population was 166, in 45 families.
