= Vartan Matiossian =

Armenian-Uruguayan translator

- Վարդան Մատթէոսեան
- Born: March 6, 1964 (age 62); Montevideo, Uruguay
- Education: National Academy of Sciences of Armenia
- Occupations: Historian, translator, editor

Vartan Matiossian (Վարդան Մատթէոսեան in Armenian) (born March 6, 1964) is a diasporan Armenian historian, translator and editor. He is currently Executive Director of the Eastern Prelacy of the Armenian Apostolic Church (New York) and book review editor for Armenian Review.

== Biography ==
Matiossian was born in Montevideo, Uruguay on March 6, 1964. He moved to Buenos Aires in 1973. In 1991 he graduated from the School of Economic Sciences of the University of Buenos Aires. From 1992 to 2000, he was associate professor of Armenian History and Religion at the School of Eastern Studies, Universidad del Salvador (Buenos Aires). He has lived in New Jersey, US since 2000. In 2006 he earned his Ph.D. in history from the National Academy of Sciences of Armenia. He was director of the Armenian National Education Committee (New York) from 2010-2019. His fields of interest cover Armenian history and literature, both ancient and modern. He is an active contributor to the periodical press in Armenian, English, and Spanish.

== Selected bibliography ==
=== Written ===
- Կոստան Զարեանի շուրջ (On Gostan Zarian), Antelias (Lebanon): Kevork Melidinetzi Literary Prize, 1998
- Անվերջ վերադարձ. Հայաստանի ճանապարհները (1988-2004) (Eternal Return: the Roads of Armenia, 1988-2004), Yerevan: Zangak-97, 2005
- Հարաւային կողմն աշխարհի. հայերը Լատին Ամերիկայի մէջ սկիզբէն մինչեւ 1950 (The Southern Side of the Earth: Armenians in Latin America from the Beginnings to 1950), Antelias (Lebanon): Richard and Tina Carolan Literary Fund, 2005
- Շամախեցի պարուհին. Արմէն Օհանեանի կեանքն ու գործը (The Dancer of Shamakha: Life and Work of Armen Ohanian), Yerevan: Press of the Museum of Literature and Art, 2007 (coauthored with Artsvi Bakhchinyan)
- Գրական-բանասիրական ուսումնասիրութիւններ (Literary and Philological Studies), Antelias (Lebanon): Kevork Melidinetzi Literary Prize, 2009
- Pasado sin retorno, futuro que espera: los armenios en la Argentina, ayer y hoy, Montevideo: Asociación Cultural Uruguay-Armenia, 2011
- Armenian Language Matters, New York: Armenian National Education Committee, 2019
- The Politics of Naming the Armenian Genocide: Language, History, and 'Medz Yeghern', London: I. B. Tauris, 2022, 279 pages
- A Woman of the World: Armen Ohanian, the 'Dancer of Shamakha', Fresno: The Press at California State University, 2022 (coauthored with Artsvi Bakhchinyan)
- The Color of Choice: The Politics of Race in the United States and Germany (1890-1945)', Paderborn: Brill Schöningh, 2025

=== Edited ===
- Los armenios en América del Sur: Primeras Jornadas de Estudio, Buenos Aires: Instituto de Investigación Armenológica, 1992
- Bedrós Hadjian, El cinturón, translated by Berg Agemian, Buenos Aires: Akian, 2004
- Bedros Hadjian, Հարաւը Սփիւռքի մէջ (The South in the Diaspora), Aleppo: Cilicia Press, 2008
- Gurgen Mahari, Չարենց-նամէ (Յուշեր, յօդուածներ) (Charents-Nameh: Recollections, Articles), compiled by Grigor Achemyan, Yerevan: Bookinist, 2012
- Հայաստանի պատմական ատլաս / Atlas of Historical Armenia, New York: Armenian National Education Committee, 2012
- Կոմիտաս-150 / Gomidas-150, New York: Sis Publications, 2019
- Gurghen Sarkissian, Իմ յուշերը (1914-1921) / My Memoirs, New York: Sis Publications, 2021

=== Co-edited ===
- Charents: Poet of the Revolution, Costa Mesa (Ca.): Mazda Press, 2003 (with Marc Nichanian)
- Gurgen Mahari, Երկերի լիակատար ժողովածու (Integral Collection of Works), vol. I-XV, compiled by Grigor Achemyan, Yerevan: Antares, 2014-2023 (with Arqmenik Nikoghosyan)

=== Translated ===
- Sarkís Gulludjian, El arte de vivir, Buenos Aires: n.p., 1985
- Sarkís Gulludjian, La fuente de la luz, Buenos Aires: Shoghag, 1986
- Eghishé Charénts, Libro del camino, Buenos Aires: Avant, 1987, 63 pages
- Bedrós Hadjian, Grandes figuras de la cultura armenia (siglos V-X), Buenos Aires: Armengraf, 1987
- Sarkís Gulludjian, Dos conferencias esclarecedoras, Buenos Aires: Asociación Cultural Armenia Hamazkaín, 1988, 108 pages
- Bedrós Hadjian, Grandes figuras de la cultura armenia (siglos XI-XIII), Buenos Aires: Armengraf, 1990
- Iervant Odian, El camarada Panchuní, Buenos Aires: Armengraf, 1992
- Paruyr Sevak, El árbol solitario, Buenos Aires: Armengraf, 1995
- Bedrós Hadjian, La palabra silenciada: las pérdidas intelectuales del Genocidio Armenio, Buenos Aires: Armengraf, 2001
- Martirós de Yerzinka, Hovhannes Aprakunetzi, Sarguis el Monje, Itinerarios, Yerevan: Academia Linguistica Internacional, 2001, 50 pages (with Vahan Sarkisian)
- Otros tiempos: poesía contemporánea de Armenia, Yerevan: Unión de Escritores de Armenia, 2006
- Bedrós Hadjian, Cien años, cien historias: Armenia y los armenios en el siglo XX, Buenos Aires: Editum, 2007
- George (Kevork) Apelian, No vendas a mi hermanita, mamá (historias de un martirio eterno), Buenos Aires: n.p., 2009
- Artak Movsisian, La meseta sagrada: Armenia en la geografía espiritual del antiguo Medio Oriente, Yerevan: Universidad de Erevan, 2010 (with Ruben Artzruni)
- Artsvi Bakhchinyan, Armenian Cinema-100: The Early History of Armenian Cinema (from 1895 to mid 1920s), Yerevan: Academy of Cinema of Armenia and Union of Armenian Cinematographers, 2012 (with the collaboration of Susanna Mkrtchyan)
- Narrativa armenia contemporánea, Yerevan: Edit Print, 2014, 151 pages
- Հնգամեայ ծրագիր. Հայկական Համայնքներու բաժանմունք 2014-2018, Lisbon: Calouste Gulbenkian Foundation, 2014, pp. 33-67
- Haiganoush Satchian-Grkacharian, Hadjin, If We Forget You..., Glendale: Ars Publishing, 2017, 296 pages
- Hamasdegh, House of Prayer, New York: SIS Publications, 2018, 52 pages
- Vartan Matiossian (ed.), Gomidas-150, New York: SIS Publications, 2019, 109 pages
- Gurghen Sarkissian, Իմ յուշերը (1914-1921) / My Memoirs, New York: Sis Publications, 2021, 177 pages
- Subasta de almas o Armenia arrasada: la historia de Aurora Mardiganian, Buenos Aires: Ediar, 2022, 310 pages
- Susanna Harutyunyan, La aldea escondida, Madrid: Armaenia Ediciones, 2025.
