= Noorani Basti =

Locality in Hyderabad, Pakistan

Coordinates: 34°02′N 71°35′E

Noorani Basti نورانی بستی
- Town
- Interactive map of Noorani Basti
- Country: Pakistan
- Province: Sindh
- City: Hyderabad
- Time zone: UTC+5 (PST)

Noorani Basti is a locality of Hyderabad, Sindh, Pakistan.

== See also ==
- Ilyasabad
- Latifabad
