= Təklə, Gobustan =

Təklə
- Municipality
- Location within Azerbaijan
- Coordinates: 40°35′31″N 48°46′56″E
- Country: Azerbaijan
- Rayon: Gobustan

Population
  - Total: 1,782
- Time zone: UTC+4 (AZT)
  - Summer (DST): UTC+5 (AZT)

Təklə (formerly Leninabad) is a village and municipality in the Gobustan Rayon of Azerbaijan. It has a population of 1,782.
