= Basti, Nepal =

Basti बस्ती
- Village development committee
- Location in Nepal
- Coordinates: 29.06°N 81.18°E
- Country: Nepal
- Zone: Seti Zone
- District: Achham District

Population (2001)
  - Total: 3,601
  - Religions: Hindu
- Time zone: UTC+5:45 (Nepal Time)

Basti is a small town in Achham District in the Seti Zone of western Nepal. According to the 1991 Nepal census, it has a population of 3282 and 693 houses in the village. At the time of the 2001 Nepal census, the population was 3601, of which 37% was literate.
