= Abadi (rural locality) =

Type of rural location

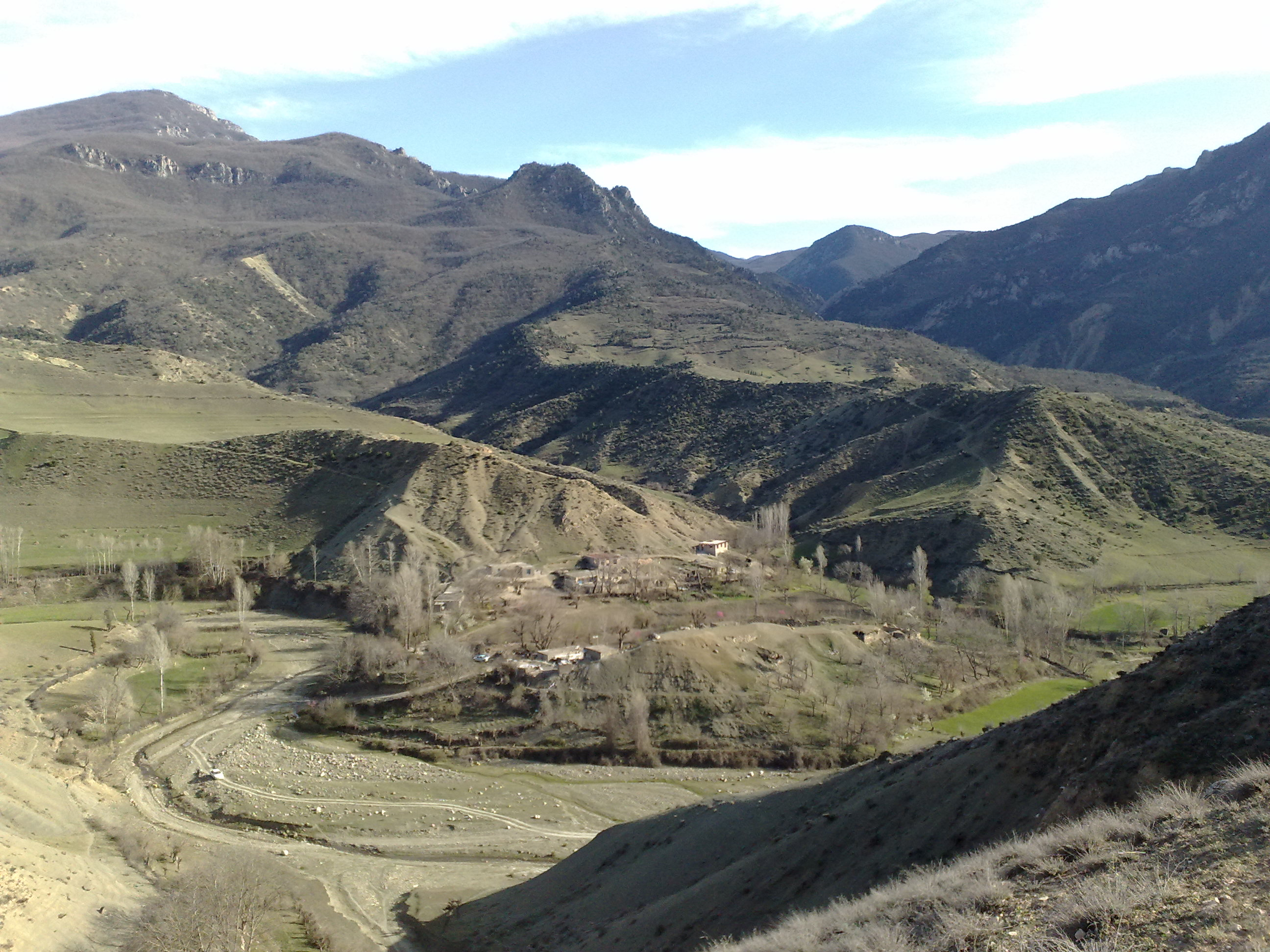
A typical abadi in Iran

An abadi (Persian: آبادی, romanized: ābādī, from آباد ābād which translates to 'populous, thriving, prosperous') is a Persian term used to describe a rural location, typically a settlement in a rural environment, and informally a larger settlement.

Being a generic and ambiguous term referring to small settlements, the statistical center of Iran uses the term in a broader sense, either a village, farm and "site" – such as gas stations, restaurants, mines and railway stations. As of the 1973 census 23 per cent of abadis were non-residential.

== See also ==
- Oikonyms in Western and South Asia
