= Basti (novel) =

Urdu novel written by Intizar Hussain

- Author: Intizar Hussain
- Original title: بستی
- Translator: Frances W. Pritchett
- Language: Urdu
- Genre: Historical fiction
- Publisher: Naqsh-e-Avval Kitab Ghar
- Publication date: 1979
- Publication place: Pakistan
- English publication date: 2012
- Media type: Print (paperback)

Basti (Urdu: بستی) is an Urdu language novel written by Intizar Hussain. This novel mapped the socio-psychological expressions of the India-Pakistan partition in 1947 and the creation of Bangladesh in 1971.

Basti is the first novel of Hussain's Partition trilogy, followed by Aagey Samandar Hai and Naya Ghar. The first edition was published in 1979 by Naqsh-e-Avval Kitab Ghar, Lahore 1979.

Basti has been translated into Hindi, Persian and English. The English translation by Frances W. Pritchett was published in 2012 and was nominated for the Man Booker Prize 2013.

== Synopsis ==
The main character of this novel is a young man named Zakir. He struggles with the consequences of the India-Pakistan Partition of 1947 and the subsequent socio-political changes. He is a professor of history in Lahore. He struggles with constructing a familiar space, fighting with loss, establishing a new identity and the memory of his native village.

The story begins with Zakir's memories of his happy childhood spent in his native village of Rupnagar in Uttar Pardesh, India. He recalls a harmonious, multicultural community where Hindus and Muslims co-existed peacefully. This period was marked by a strong sense of belonging, cultural richness and the beauty of shared traditions. Later, he migrated to Lahore, Pakistan, because of partition. His psychological state is always connected to these memories. His new life was cosmopolitan. The second major incident was the creation of Pakistan and the accompanying tensions.

== Reception ==
The English translation of Basti was published by the New York Review of Books in 2012. This marked a milestone in bringing Urdu literature to the world. Translator Franoes Pritohett said that this books reminds Urdu-lovers of their South Asian cultural history and brings back the discussion over the pain of partition.

Raza Rumi in The Dawn stated that the ending was not clear because it revolves opens a discussion over the emptiness of human existence.

Critics also criticised the novel's style and counted this as more autobiography than novel. Writer Intizar Hussain stated that his personal life reflected a similar journey.
