= Kasan Wala =

Kasan Wala Dera is a small village situated in the Soon Valley, Khushab District, Punjab, Pakistan. This village, or Dera, is part of Union Council Kund. The village has few houses, and is located near Dada Golra Mosque on the way to Naushehra from Khushab. It is located in the Soon valley, and Naushehra is just 20 kilometers away. Dera Kasan is about 35 kilometres from Khushab City. The Rehan clan of Awan Tribe resides here.
