= Básti =

Básti is a Hungarian surname. Notable people with the surname include:

- István Básti (born 1944), Hungarian football player
- Lajos Básti (1911–1977), Hungarian actor
- Juli Básti (born 1957), Hungarian actress

== See also ==
- Basti (name)
