= Basti Mian Ahmed Din =

Village in Punjab, Pakistan

Basti Mian Ahmed Deen is a village in Ahmedpur Sial Tehsil, Jhang District, in the Punjab province, Pakistan. It is named after a person who served for the village, Mian Ahmed Deen Bhatti. Its population is about 1,000. The people of Basti Mian Ahmed Deen are very religious minded. Mian Faiz Ahmad Bhatti is also a successor to Mian Ahmed Deen Bhatti.
