= Gaighat =

Gaighat may refer to:

- Gaighat, Nepal, headquarters of Triyuga municipality
- Gaighat, Ghazipur, a village in India
- Gaighat (Vidhan Sabha constituency) in the state of Bihar, India
- Gaighat, Patna, a neighbourhood in Patna
