= Bedros Hadjian =

Syrian-Armenian writer

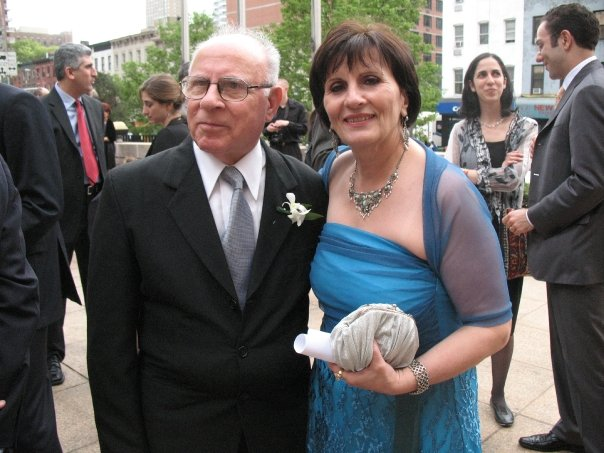
- Bedrós and Sossie Hadjian
- Born: January 24, 1933 Jarabulus, Syria
- Died: 3 September 2012 (aged 79) Buenos Aires, Argentina

Bedrós Hadjian (Armenian: Պետրոս Հաճեան; January 24, 1933 in Jarabulus, Syria – September 3, 2012 in Buenos Aires, Argentina) was a Buenos Aires–based Syrian Armenian writer, educator and journalist. In 1954 he became the headteacher of the Armenian school of Deir el Zor, in northern Syria, one of the destination points of Armenians marched off by Ottoman authorities during the 1915 Armenian genocide.

After teaching Armenian History and Literature at the Haygazian Armenian School of Aleppo from the mid-1960s, Hadjian was named in 1968 principal of the Karen Jeppe Gemaran, the biggest Armenian secondary school of Aleppo and one of the most prominent in the Armenian diaspora.

In 1970 Hadjian moved to Buenos Aires as the headmaster of the Instituto Educativo San Gregorio El Iluminador, one of the biggest Armenian schools in South America. He also became the editor of Armenia, an Armenian-language daily newspaper that became a weekly in the late 1980s, from 1971–1986. He retired as the headmaster of San Gregorio El Iluminador in 2003. Since 1986, he devoted himself to writing fiction and non-fiction books, published in Buenos Aires, Aleppo and Yerevan. He was a frequent contributor to Armenian newspapers such as Haratch in Paris, Nor Gyank in Los Angeles and Sardarabad in Buenos Aires on Armenian affairs, as well as literature and book reviews.

== Books ==
- «Պարզ քերականութիւն» (Simple Grammar), vols. 1, 2 and 3 (Buenos Aires, 1986-1987).
- «Հայ մտքի մշակներ / Grandes Figuras de la Cultura Armenia», siglos V-X (Great Figures of the Armenian Culture, 5th to 10th Centuries) (Buenos Aires, 1987, translated by Vartan Matiossian).
- «Հայ մտքի մշակներ / Grandes Figuras de la Cultura Armenia», siglos XI-XIV (Great Figures of the Armenian Culture, 11th to 14th Centuries) (Buenos Aires, 1990, translated by Vartan Matiossian).
- «Հրամմեցէք պարոններ» (Help Yourself, Gentlemen) (Buenos Aires, 1995, in Armenian).
- La palabra silenciada: las victimas intelectuales del Genocidio Armenio (Buenos Aires, 2000, translated by Vartan Matiossian).
- «100 տարի, 100 պատմութիւն» (One Hundred Years, One Hundred Stories) (Buenos Aires, 2001).
- «Կար ու չկար» (Once Upon a Time) (Buenos Aires, 2003).
- «Կարկեմիշ» (Karkemish) (Aleppo, 2005).
- El Cinturón (The Belt) (Buenos Aires, 2005, translated by Berg Agemian).
- Cien Años, Cien Historias (Buenos Aires, 2007, translated by Vartan Matiossian).
- «Ճանապարհ դէպի Կարկեմիշ» (The Road to Karkemish) (Yerevan, 2008).
- «Հարաւը Սփիւռքի մէջ» (The South in the Diaspora) (Aleppo, 2008).
- One Hundred Years, One Hundred Stories (Aleppo, 2009, translated by Aris Sevag).
