= Basti Malana =

Basti mulana
- Union council and town
- Basti Mulana
- Location in Pakistan
- Coordinates: 29°52′N 70°39′E
- Country: Pakistan
- Province: Punjab
- District: Dera Ghazi Khan District

Government
- Elevation: 348 ft (106 m)
- Time zone: UTC+5 (PST)
  - Summer (DST): +6

Basti Mulana is a town and union council of Dera Ghazi Khan District in the Punjab province of Pakistan. It is located at 29°52'0N 70°39'0E and has an altitude of 106 metres (351 feet).
