= Jetalvasana =

- Village
- Location in Gujarat, India
- Coordinates: 23.7295°N 72.4069°E
- Country: India
- State: Gujarat
- District: Mehsana

Government
  - Type: Gram Panchyat
  - Body: Gram Panchyat

Population (2011)
  - Total: 3,500

Languages
  - Official: Gujarati, Hindi
- Time zone: UTC+5:30 (IST)
- PIN: 384120
- Telephone code: 02765
- Vehicle registration: GJ-2-
- Website: www.20nagar.com www.visnagarcity.com

Jetalvasana (Jetalvāsaṇā) is a village of Visnagar Taluka in Mehsana district in the Indian state of Gujarat with a population in 2011 of 3311 persons.

== Name ==
The name Jetalvāsaṇā is formed using the suffix vāsaṇā, meaning "dwelling" or "residence" (of either an individual or a group).
