= Basti Babbar =

- Location within Pakistan
- Coordinates: 29.41°N 70.17°E
- Country: Pakistan
- Province: Punjab
- District: Bahawalpur
- Elevation: 150 m (490 ft)
- Time zone: UTC+5 (PST)

Basti Babbar is a town of Bahawalpur District in the Punjab province of eastern Pakistan.
