= Basti Nari =

- Location within Pakistan
- Coordinates: 29.38°N 70.24°E
- Country: Pakistan
- Province: Punjab
- District: Bahawalpur
- Elevation: 105 m (344 ft)
- Time zone: UTC+5 (PST)

Basti Nari is a town of Bahawalpur District in the Punjab province of eastern Pakistan. Neighbouring settlements include Faqirwali and Khosa.
