= Abderraouf El Basti =

Tunisian politician

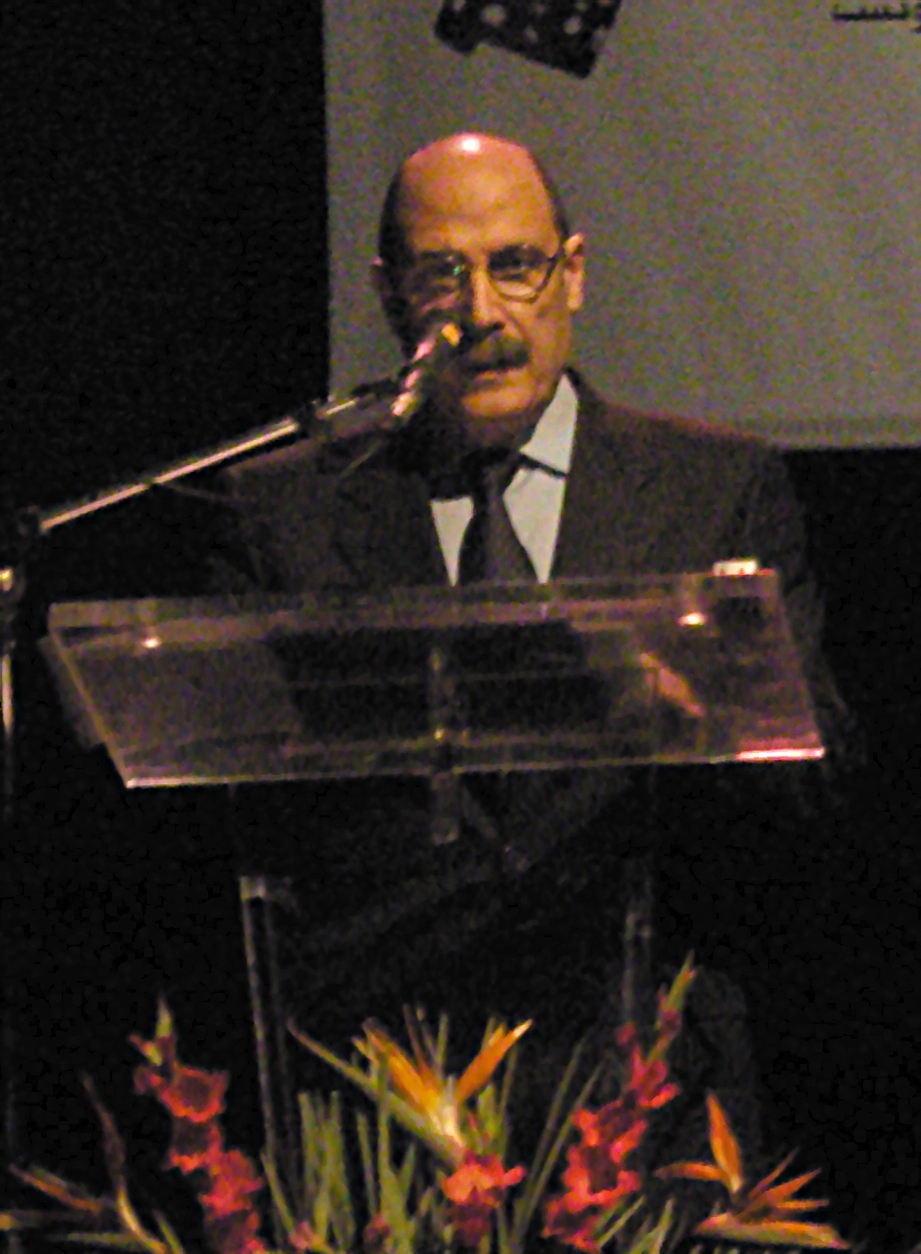

Abderraouf El Basti is a Tunisian politician. He is the former Minister of Culture and Protection of National Heritage.

== Biography ==
Abderraouf El Basti was born on August 19, 1947. He received a master's degree in Arabic literature from the University of Tunis.

From 1981 to 1988, he worked for the Union des Radios Arabes, and he was its CEO from 1989 to 1998. From 1999 to 2000, he was the Tunisian Ambassador to Lebanon. From 2000 to 2002, he was the President of the Établissement de la Radiodiffusion-Télévision Tunisienne. He was then Ambassador to Jordan. In 2007, he was appointed as Secretary of State to the Foreign Ministry. In 2008, he became the Minister of Culture and Protection of National Heritage.
