= Lodhwari =

Lodhwari Lodhwāri
- Village
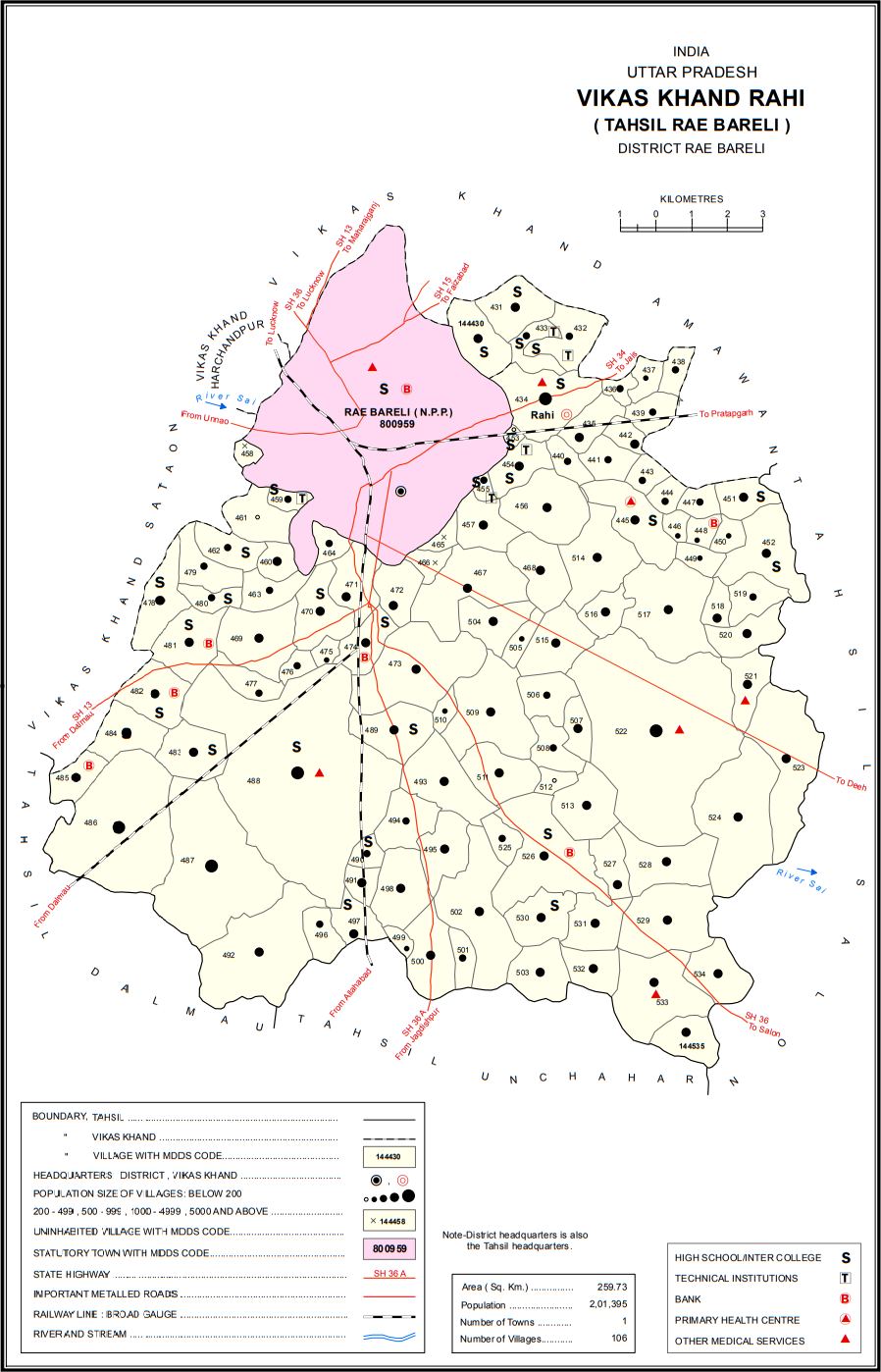
- Map showing Lodhwari (#522) in Rahi CD block

- Location in Uttar Pradesh, India
- Coordinates: 26.158214°N 81.326221°E
- Country India: India
- State: Uttar Pradesh
- District: Raebareli

Area
  - Total: 15.176 km^{2} (5.859 sq mi)

Population (2011)
  - Total: 10,592
  - Density: 697.94/km^{2} (1,807.7/sq mi)

Languages
  - Official: Hindi
- Time zone: UTC+5:30 (IST)
- Vehicle registration: UP-33

Lodhwari is a village in Rahi block of Rae Bareli district, Uttar Pradesh, India. It is located 12 km from Rae Bareli, the district headquarters, on the left bank of the Sai river. The road to Parshadepur runs through the northeastern part of the village lands. As of 2011, Lodhwari has a population of 10,592 people, in 2,019 households.

== History ==
At the turn of the 20th century, Lodhwari was described as a large and dispersed village consisting of 32 hamlets. Its population as of 1901 was 3,218, a majority of whom were Ahirs. There was a small bazar, which held markets twice per week, and an aided indigenous school. It had previously formed part of the estate belonging to Beni Madho Bakhsh, but it was confiscated after the Indian Rebellion of 1857 and was held at the time by a Sikh Sardar.

The 1961 census recorded Lodhwari as comprising 29 hamlets, with a total population of 3,646 people (1,980 male and 1,666 female), in 803 households and 792 physical houses. The area of the village was given as 3,861 acres and it had a medical practitioner and a post office at that point.

The 1981 census recorded Lodhwari (as "Lodhawari") as having a population of 5,555 people, in 180 households, and having an area of 1,387.72 hectares. The main staple foods were given as wheat and rice.
