= Sardarabad (weekly) =

Argentine newspaper

Sardarabad (Armenian: Սարտարապատ) is an Armenian-Argentine bilingual newspaper established in Buenos Aires, Argentina in 1975. It is the official organ of the Armenian Democratic Liberal Party (Ramgavar party) in Argentina. The name title refers to the Battle of Sardarabad of May 1918. Sardarabad is published weekly in Spanish, with a few additional pages in Armenian.
