= Basti Maluk =

Basti Malook بستی ملوک
- City District
- Nickname: The City of Schools
- Location in Pakistan
- Coordinates: 30°11′52″N 71°28′11″E
- Country: Pakistan
- Region: Punjab
- District: Multan District
- Autonomous towns: 2
- Town Committee: 1

Area
  - City District: 25 km^{2} (9.7 sq mi)
- Elevation: 122 m (400 ft)

Population (2019)
  - City District: 72Thousand
  - Urban: 20,000
- Time zone: UTC+5 (PST)
- Postal code: 59150
- Area code: 061

Basti Malook (Urdu: بستی ملوک) is a town in the Multan District, Punjab, Pakistan. Basti Malook, its localities and sub-towns comprise a population of around 20,000. It is located at 29°51′16″N 71°32′11″E and an altitude of 119 meters.

Basti Malook is situated 35 km south of Multan. Dunyapur is located to its east, and Shujabad to its west, well known for its mangoes. To its south is the settlement of Makhdoom Aali. This place is known for its Sohan Halwa.

== History ==
Before partition, Basti Maluk and surrounding areas were largely unpopulated and consisted of uncultivated land. In order to start cultivation in this area, in 1930 British Raj settled a large number of agricultural families here. Some of them were migrated from Salt Range i.e. Khushab, Jhelum, etc. Among these families which migrated here were Awans.

== Educational institutions ==
Some government education institutions are govt high school for boys, govt high school for girls, Govt degree college for women. There are many schools and colleges in this area including:

- Al-Siraj Public Girls High School
- PF Cadet School
- The Country School Ujala Campus
- Mujahid Model School
- Ibn e qasim comrade college
- Fort Education System
- Vision college
- The Educators School System
- Dar-e-Arqam School System
- Azeem College of Technology

== Business centre ==
This area was totally agricultural before 2010 but since then it has gained business popularity in a short time. Now it is one of the business platforms for the businessmen. Now it is totally commercial area. The main cause of its popularity is that this town is situated at the multan lodhran highway. It also connects 4 main cities (multan, lodhran, shujabad and Dunya pur). So it is center of these cities.
