= Dehestan (administrative division) =

Type of administrative division in Iran

A dehestan (Persian: دهستان, lit. 'rural district', also Romanized as "dehestān") is a type of administrative division of Iran. It is above the village and under the bakhsh.

The name “dehestan” comes from the word “deh” (Persian: ده — village) and the suffix “-stan”.

Dehestan is an integral part of a bakhsh (equivalent to a district); the bakhsh, in turn, is part of a shahrestan (equivalent to a county), and the shahrestan is part of an ostan (equivalent to a province). The ostan, in turn, are part of the semi‑official regions of Iran. A dehestan unites several rural settlements, which in Persian are today officially called “rusta” (Pers. ده — Rustó).

Dehestans usually have their administrative center in the form of one of the rural settlements (usually the largest or the one located in the geographical center) that are part of it. There are also many dehestans that do not have an administrative center; their functions are performed by the administrative centers of the corresponding bakhsh. Currently (as of 2026), there are 2,589 dehestans in Iran, comprising 1,057 bakhshs (comprising 491 shahrestans).

The number of dehestans, and somewhat less frequently bakhsh and shahrestans, is increasing year by year due to their division. Some dehestans may be abolished, and their territories may be incorporated into other dehestans or into cities. A dehestan may be home to anywhere from just a few people to more than one hundred thousand.

There are 62,284 inhabited rural localities (Abadi) and, in addition, 35,700 uninhabited ones, which are distributed among these dehestans (i.e., in Iran, the total number of officially recorded rural localities is more than 98,000). More than 24.7 million people (out of the country’s 93.2 million population) live in dehestans in Iran, or approximately 26.5 %.

Dehestans emerged on November 7, 1937, as part of a major administrative‑territorial reform carried out by the then Iranian Shah, Reza Shah, during the period of the Pahlavi Iran, and they have existed to this day. The position of the head of a dehestan is called a “dehdar”. The governing body is a “dehdari” (village council).
