= Faqirwali =

- Town
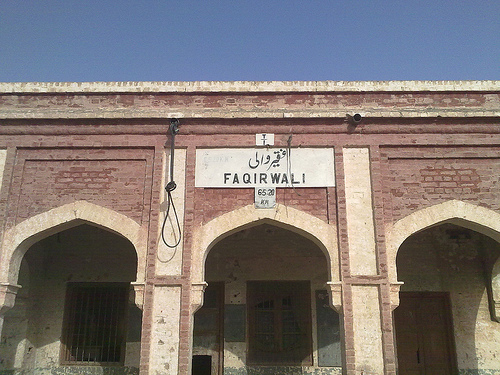
- Faqirwali's historic Railway Station

- Location within Pakistan
- Coordinates: 29.47°N 73.04°E
- Country: Pakistan
- Province: Punjab
- District: Bahawalpur
- Elevation: 114 m (374 ft)

Population (2023)
  - Total: 61,586
- Time zone: UTC+5 (PST)
- Postal code: 62050
- Dialing code: 063

Faqirwali (Urdu: فقِيروالى) is a town of Bahawalnagar District in the Punjab province of eastern Pakistan.

== Demography ==
=== Population ===
Historical population
Year	Pop.	±% p.a.
1951	...	—
1961	...	—
1972	...	—
1981	10,444	—
1998	21,546	+4.35%
2017	34,920	+2.57%
2023	61,586	+9.92%

As of the 2023 census, Faqirwali had a population of 61,586.

== Climate ==
The average climate of Faqirwali is hot and humid. The temperature extremes occur during the months of May, June, and July, when the temperature reaches up to 49-53 °C. In August, the monsoon seasons starts, with heavy rainfall throughout the area. December and January are the coldest months, when temperatures can drop up to -1 °C. The annual average rainfall is 160 mm.

Climate data for Faqirwali
Month	Jan	Feb	Mar	Apr	May	Jun	Jul	Aug	Sep	Oct	Nov	Dec	Year
Record high °C (°F)	29.3 (84.7)	35.6 (96.1)	39.4 (102.9)	45.6 (114.1)	48.0 (118.4)	50.1 (122.2)	46.0 (114.8)	42.4 (108.3)	42.0 (107.6)	40.0 (104.0)	37.0 (98.6)	29.6 (85.3)	50.1 (122.2)
Mean daily maximum °C (°F)	20.6 (69.1)	22.76 (72.97)	28.3 (82.9)	35.9 (96.6)	40.8 (105.4)	42.0 (107.6)	38.3 (100.9)	37.4 (99.3)	36.5 (97.7)	34.2 (93.6)	28.6 (83.5)	22.5 (72.5)	32.32 (90.17)
Daily mean °C (°F)	13.3 (55.9)	15.7 (60.3)	21.0 (69.8)	28.0 (82.4)	32.8 (91.0)	35.1 (95.2)	33.1 (91.6)	32.4 (90.3)	30.6 (87.1)	26.4 (79.5)	20.6 (69.1)	15.0 (59.0)	25.3 (77.6)
Mean daily minimum °C (°F)	5.8 (42.4)	8.4 (47.1)	13.8 (56.8)	20.0 (68.0)	24.7 (76.5)	28.2 (82.8)	27.8 (82.0)	27.4 (81.3)	24.7 (76.5)	18.6 (65.5)	12.6 (54.7)	7.6 (45.7)	18.3 (64.9)
Record low °C (°F)	0.0 (32.0)	−1.0 (30.2)	3.9 (39.0)	12.6 (54.7)	14.4 (57.9)	18.3 (64.9)	16.1 (61.0)	21.4 (70.5)	13.1 (55.6)	11.0 (51.8)	4.0 (39.2)	1.7 (35.1)	−1.0 (30.2)
Average precipitation mm (inches)	4.5 (0.18)	16.5 (0.65)	15.2 (0.60)	10.2 (0.40)	4.8 (0.19)	15.3 (0.60)	77.2 (3.04)	39.9 (1.57)	9.5 (0.37)	1.0 (0.04)	4.3 (0.17)	5.0 (0.20)	203.4 (8.01)
Mean monthly sunshine hours	222.4	218.9	250.8	274.3	269.1	213.9	218.3	256.6	279.3	284.0	260.8	223.5	2,971.9
Source: NOAA (1971–1990) "Bahawalnagar Climate Normals 1971–1990". National Oceanic and Atmospheric Administration (FTP). (To view documents see Help:FTP)
