= Doabgah =

Village in Indian Administered Kashmir

Doabgah Dobgao (Kashmiri)
- Hamlet/ Village
- Location in Jammu and Kashmir, India Doabgah (India)
- Coordinates: 34.267°N 74.414°E
- Country: India
- Union territory: Jammu and Kashmir
- District: Baramulla

Languages
  - Official: Kashmiri, Urdu, Hindi, Dogri, English
- Time zone: UTC+5:30 (IST)
- PIN: 193301
- Telephone code: 01952
- Vehicle registration: JK 05

Doabgah is a small village in Baramulla district of Jammu and Kashmir, India. The nearest town is Sopore (~4 km away). The name "Doabgah" (From Persian and Urdu "Do" meaning "two", "Aab" meaning "water"(Persian) and "Gah" meaning "place" in Persian and Urdu) literally means "a place with two waters". The village has been named so as two prominent rivers of Kashmir meet here, namely Pohru River and Jhelum River. Doabgah was given backward status in 2012 by the government of Jammu and Kashmir. The village is bestowed with two beautiful rivers, Jhelum River on the southern side and Pohru River along the eastern face. The other neighboring villages of Doabgah are Vijabal on the western side and Achabal, Baramulla on the northern front.

Quite different from the neighboring villages, Doabgah enjoys a good relationship with Sopore town and Srinagar city attributed to the business ties with these places, which in turn has influenced the general living standard. This village has produced business tycoons like Abdul Samad Pandith as well as a world-renowned cardiologist Dr. Abdul Ahad Guru (first open-heart surgeon of Jammu and Kashmir).

== Education Infrastructure ==
Doabgah has produced many doctors, researchers, and engineers. The village has three esteemed schools with trained faculty having a great contribution to the intellect of the village.

1. A government-run higher secondary school namely Govt. Higher Secondary School, Doabgah was established in 1925 and managed by the Department of Education, Jammu and Kashmir. It offers education up to 12th standard in science, commerce and arts streams.

2. A Girls High school established in 1925 and managed by the Department of Education offers schooling up to 10th standard.

3. Model Public High School, established in 1964, is a quality private school (unaided) run by local elders and offers schooling up to 10th standard.
