= Institute of Human Behaviour and Allied Sciences =

Research institute in New Delhi, India

Institute of Human Behaviour and Allied Scs (IHBAS), formerly known as Hospital for Mental Diseases

Geography
- Location: Dilshad Garden, Delhi, India.
- Coordinates: 28.681°N 77.305°E

Organisation
- Care system: Government
- Type: Mental health and Neuroscience clinical and research institution
- Affiliated university: University of Delhi, National Medical Commission

Services
- Beds: 300

History
- Founded: 1993

Links
- Website: ihbas.delhi.gov.in

The Institute of Human Behaviour and Allied Sciences (IHBAS), formerly known as Hospital for Mental Diseases, Shahdara, is a mental health and neurosciences research institute based in Shahdara, New Delhi, India. IHBAS is the largest mental hospitals in the world in terms of number of patients served and area of campus. It also houses the state mental health authority (SMHA) of Delhi.

== History ==
=== HMD ===
The Hospital for Mental Diseases in Shahdara, Delhi (HMD) was the final establishment built that started from a chain of lunatic asylums that were begun by the East India Company and British Raj. The building has been described as having "a flavour of a custodial setting". Service users with mental illness were accommodated in closed cells within high hospital walls.

=== IHBAS ===
IHBAS was established in 1993, in response to a Supreme Court verdict, transforming previous HMD into a centre for treatment, training, and research. It is an Autonomous Society under administration by the Delhi Government. It has three clinical and all other para and allied branches.

== Controversy & Criticism ==
=== Refusal to Divulge Patient Records under RTI Act ===
The Hindu in August 2013 reported that multiple requests for a photocopy of medical records of individuals who sought treatment were refused by the Department of Psychiatry, IHBAS, New Delhi. The director of the institute stated that the verdict he maintained to requests for copies were upheld by Central Information Commission (CIC) which monitors upon the proper enforcement of Right to Information Act. The director also states that the medical records of the patients contained information about them by informants such as family members and thus could not be divulged.

=== Evaluation and Detention of Criminal Convict ===
In June, 2013, The Hindustan Times reported that Devinderpal Singh Bhullar who was accused in a 1993 bombing incident which killed 9 people was evaluated for more than 1 year in IHBAS, New Delhi there the treating psychiatrists concluded that he was suffering from severe depression and was not mentally fit for his execution in Tihar Jail.

== Sources ==
- Jiloha, R.C.; Kukreti, Prerna (February 2018). "Psychiatry in Delhi: History and current status". Indian Journal of Psychiatry. 60 (Suppl 2): S218–S223. doi:10.4103/psychiatry.IndianJPsychiatry_452_17. PMC 5836341. PMID 29527051. S218–223.
