= Jhelum River =

River in India and Pakistan

Jhelum Hydaspes, Bidaspes, Vitástā, Bihat, Vehat, Bihatab, Biyatta, Jailam, Vyath
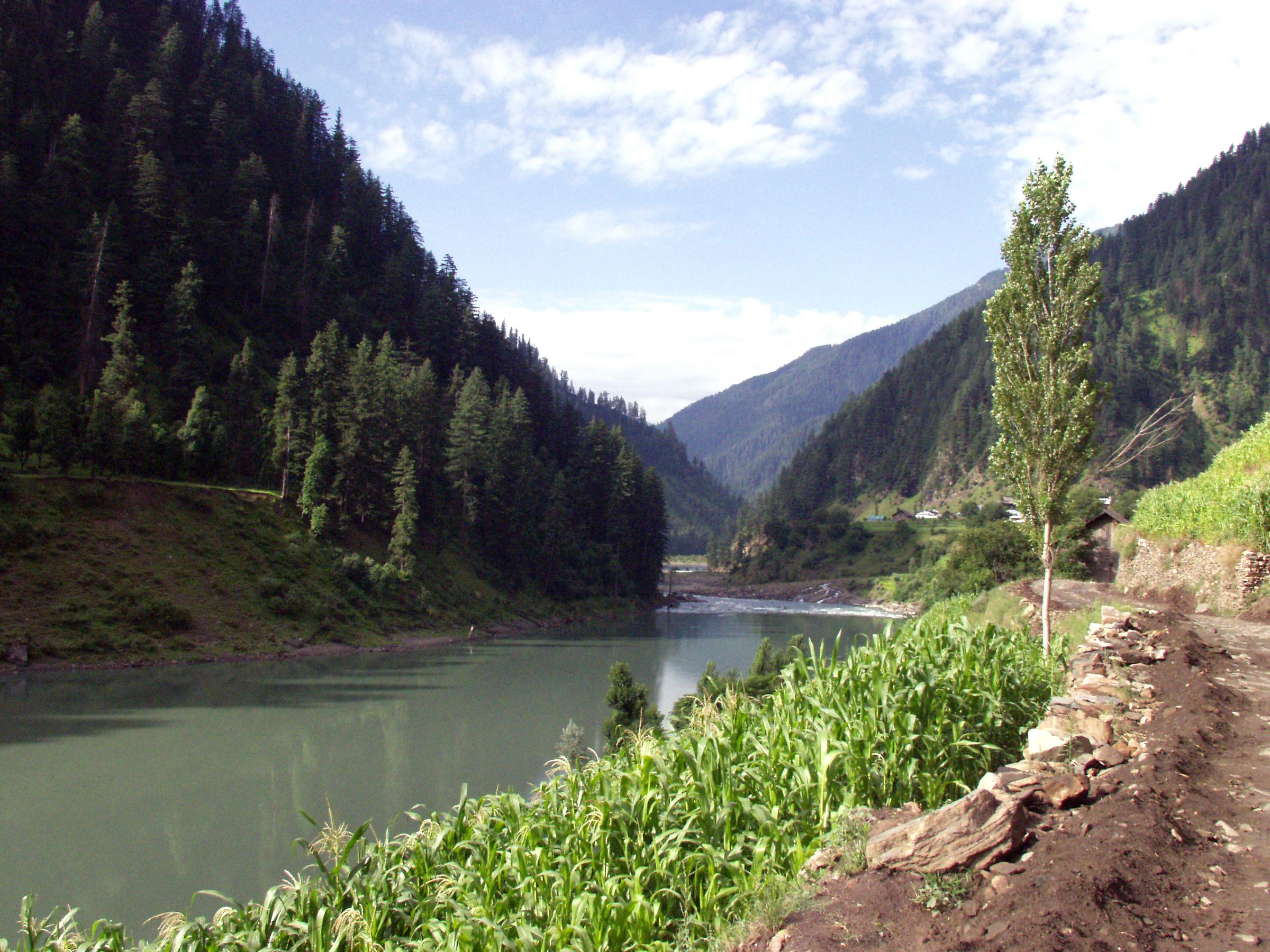
- Jhelum River photographed in Pakistan, c. 2006

Location
- Countries: India, Pakistan

Physical characteristics
- Source
  - location: Verinag Spring
  - coordinates: 33°32′05″N 75°14′59″E
- Mouth
  - location: Chenab River at Trimmu, Jhang District
  - coordinates: 31°10′N 72°09′E
- Length: 725 km (450 mi)
- Discharge
  - average: 1,026.6 m^{3}/s (36,250 cu ft/s) (near Mangla Dam)
  - minimum: 234.19 m^{3}/s (8,270 cu ft/s) (near Mangla Dam)
  - maximum: 26,419.13 m^{3}/s (932,983 cu ft/s) (near Mangla Dam)
- Discharge
  - average: 313.19 m^{3}/s (11,060 cu ft/s) (near Domel)
- Discharge
  - average: 229.20 m^{3}/s (8,094 cu ft/s) (near Baramulla)

Basin features
- River system: Indus River
- Tributaries
  - left: Poonch River, Sukhnag River, Veshaw River, Rambiara River, Ramoshi River, Doodh Ganga,Ferozpur Nalla River, Ningle Nalla, Pohru River
  - right: Arpath River, Lidder River, Brengi River, Kishanganga River/Neelum River, Sind River, Kunhar River, Pohru River, Erin River

The Jhelum River (Note: Kashmiri pronunciation: [ʋʲatʰ dərʲjaːʋ]; Punjabi pronunciation: [d͡ʒéˈlɐm / véːt̪ᵊ nəˈd̪iː]; Saraiki pronunciation: [veˈɦət̪ dəɾˌjɑː]; Urdu pronunciation: [dəɾˌjɑː.e d͡ʒeɦˈləm]) is a major river in South Asia, flowing through India and Pakistan, and is the westernmost of the five major rivers of the Punjab region. It originates at Verinag in India-administered Jammu and Kashmir in the disputed Kashmir region, flows into Pakistan-administered Azad Kashmir, and then flows through the Punjab province of Pakistan. It is a tributary of the Chenab River and has a total length of about 725 kilometres (450 mi).

== Etymology ==
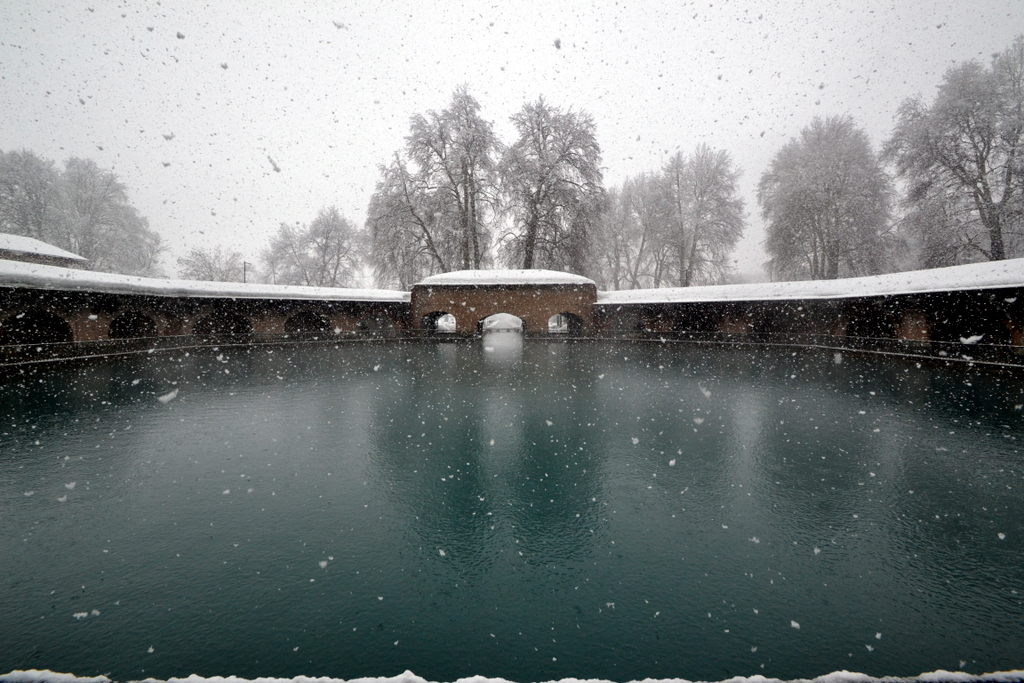
Verinag Spring is a major source of Jhelum River

A Pakistani author, Anjum Sultan Shahbaz, recorded some stories of the name Jhelum in his book Tareekh-e-Jhelum:

'Many writers have different opinions about the name of Jhelum. One suggestion is that in ancient days Jhelumabad was known as Jalham. The word Jhelum is reportedly derived from the words Jal (pure water) and Ham (snow). The name thus refers to the waters of a river (flowing beside the city) which have their origins in the snow-capped Himalayas.

The Sanskrit name for the river is Vitástā, derived from an apocryphal legend regarding the origin of the river in the Nilamata Purana. The name survives in the Kashmiri name for this river, Vyath and in Punjabi (and more commonly in Saraiki) as Vehat. It was called the Hydaspes by the armies of Alexander the Great.

== History ==
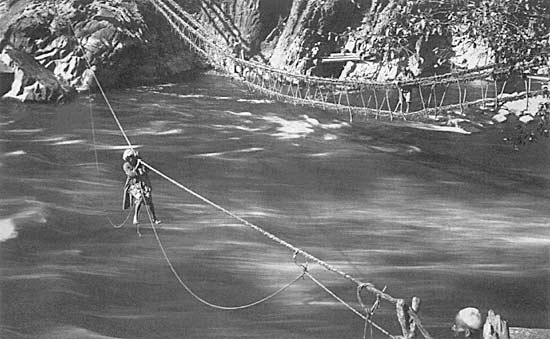
A passenger traversing the river precariously seated in a small suspended cradle Circa 1900

The river Jhelum was originally recognized by the name Vitasta. The river was called Hydaspes (Greek: Ὑδάσπης) by the ancient Greeks.

According to Greek sources, Alexander III of Macedon and his army crossed the Jhelum River in 326 BCE and defeated the Indian King Porus at the Battle of the Hydaspes. After the battle, Alexander founded two cities: Nikaia, on the site where the battle was fought, and Bucephala, located at the site where he first crossed the River Hydaspes and subsequently named in honor of his recently deceased horse, Bucephalas.

The modern-day town of Jalalpur Sharif, outside Jhelum, is said to be where Bucephalus is buried. Residents of the nearby Mandi Bahauddin district believe that their tehsil, the town of Phalia, is named after Alexander's horse, saying that the name Phalia was a distortion of Bucephala.

The waters of the Jhelum are allocated to Pakistan under the terms of the Indus Waters Treaty. India is working on a hydropower project on a tributary of Jhelum river to establish first-use rights on the river water over Pakistan as per the Indus Waters Treaty.

== Legends ==
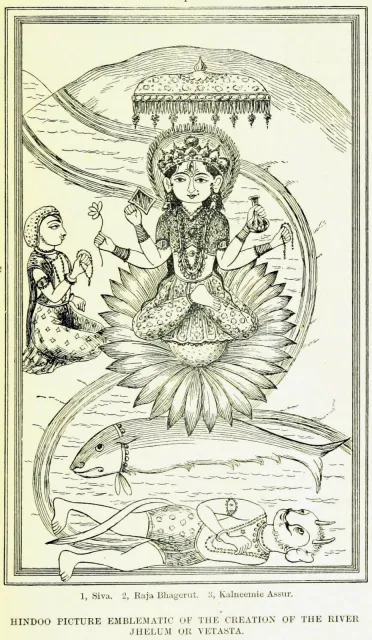
The creation of the Jhelum river according to Hindu theology

According to Hindu puranas, the goddess Parvati was requested by the sage Kashyapa to come to Kashmir to purify the land from the evil practices and impurities of the pishachas living there. Parvati assumed the form of a river in the netherworld. Her consort Shiva struck with his spear near the abode of Nila, (Verinag spring). With this stroke of the spear, Parvati emerged from the netherworld. He excavated a ditch measuring one vitasti using the spear, through which the river, originating from the netherworld, came out, and so he gave her the name Vitástā.

The ancient Greeks also regarded the river as a god, as they did most mountains and streams. The poet Nonnus in the Dionysiaca calls the Hydaspes a titan-descended god, the son of the sea-god Thaumas and the cloud-goddess Elektra, the brother of Iris, goddess of the rainbow, and half-brother to the harpies, the snatching winds. Since the river is in a foreign country, it is not clear whether they named the river after the god, or whether the god Hydaspes was named after the river.

== Course ==
=== Present course ===
The river Jhelum rises from Verinag spring at the foot of the Pir Panjal in the southeastern Kashmir Valley administered by India. It is joined by its tributaries

- Lidder River near village Mirgund at Khanabal
- Veshaw River at Sangam in Anantnag
- Sind River at Shadipora
- Pohru River at Doabgah in Sopore, Jammu and Kashmir.

It flows through Srinagar and Wular Lake before entering Pakistan-administered Kashmir through a deep narrow gorge. The Kishanganga River/Neelum River, the largest tributary of the Jhelum, joins it at Domel, Muzaffarabad, as does the next largest, the Kunhar River of Kaghan Valley. It is then joined by the Poonch River, and flows into the Mangla Dam reservoir in the Mirpur District. The Jhelum enters Pakistani Punjab in the Jhelum District. From there, it flows through the plains of Pakistan's Punjab, forming the boundary between the Jech and Sindh Sagar Doabs. It ends in a confluence with the Chenab River at Trimmu in the Jhang District. The Chenab merges with the Sutlej to form the Panjnad River, which joins the Indus River at Mithankot.

Most of the villages and important cities of Kashmir valley are situated on the banks of Jhelum.

The Jhelum is navigable from Khanabal up to Baramulla, a distance of about 110 km.

=== Historical course ===
The Jhelum may have once flowed in a southeastern direction into the Chenab valley, which is the opposite of its present course. Some evidence of this is that some of the present tributaries of the Jhelum join it in a direction opposite to the present course of the river and the greater topographical maturity of the Chenab valley compared to the Jhelum valley.

== Lakes ==
- Wular Lake
- Dal Lake
- Manasbal Lake
- Gangabal Lake
- Nigeen Lake
- Anchar Lake
- Khanpursar
- Gil Sar
- Ahansar Lake
- Khurwan Sar

== Infrastructure ==
=== Bridges ===
- Victoria Bridge, Haranpur, constructed in 1973, approximate 5 km from Malakwal near Chak Nizam village. Its length is 1 km, mainly used by Pakistan Railways, but there is a passage for light vehicles, motorcycles, cycles and pedestrians on one side.

=== Dams ===
Listed in the order of upstream to downstream.

==== India ====
The river has rich power generation potential in India. Water control structures are being built as a result of the Indus Basin Project, including the following:

- On Jhelum
  - Kishanganga Hydroelectric Power Project, 330 MW, in Bandipora district, completed in 2018. In May 2025, after suspending IWT, India has decided to significantly increase the capacity of the Kishanganga Project.
  - Uri-I Stage-I Hydroelectric Power Project, 480 MW, in Baramulla district, completed in 1997.
  - Uri-I Stage-II Hydroelectric Power Project, 240 MW, in Baramulla district, under tendering in 2025.
- On tributaries of Jhelum
  - Owari Nag Nallah
    - Karnah Hydroelectric Power Project, 12 MW, at village Haridal (Pingla Haridal) in the Kupwara district. 53% complete in October 2023.
  - Kalnai River
    - Lower Kalnai Hydroelectric Project, 48 MW, at Donadi in Doda district, under-construction stalled project expedited in April 2025 after the termination of IWT.
  - Sind River
    - Upper Sind Hydroelectric Project 1st at Sumbal in Bandipora district, 22.6 MW, completed in 1973.
    - Upper Sind Hydroelectric Project 2nd, 127.6 MW, at Kangan in Ganderbal district, completed in 2002.
    - Lower Sind Hydroelectric Power project at Ganderbal in Ganderbal district, 15 MW (produced only 2MW due to reduced flow), completed in 1955.

==== Pakistan ====
- Karot Hydropower Project, 720 MW, concrete-core rockfill gravity large dam in Pakistan was completed in 2022.
- Mangla Dam, 1070 MW, 7278 MCM, completed in 1967, is one of the largest earth-fill dams in the world.
- Rasul Barrage, 22 MW, constructed in 1967, has a maximum flow of 850,000 ft³/s (24,000 m³/s).
- Trimmu Barrage, 1263 MW, constructed in 1939 20 km from Jhang city at the confluence with the Chenab, has maximum discharge capacity of 645,000 ft³/s (18,000 m³/s).

=== Canals ===
- Pakistan
  - Upper Jhelum Canal runs from Mangla Dam to the Chenab.
  - Rasul-Qadirabad Link Canal
  - Chashma Jhelum Link Canal runs from the Chashma Barrage on the Indus River to the Jhelum river.

== Gallery ==
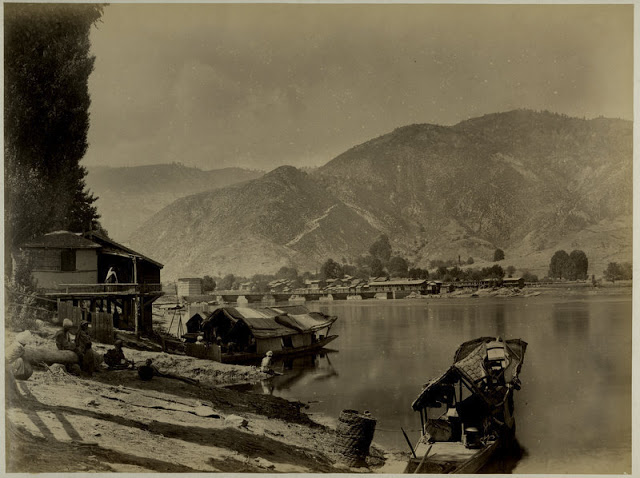
Jhelum river, Baramullah, Kashmir, 1880s

Jhelum River c. 1900; photo taken by Eugene Whitehead Esq.

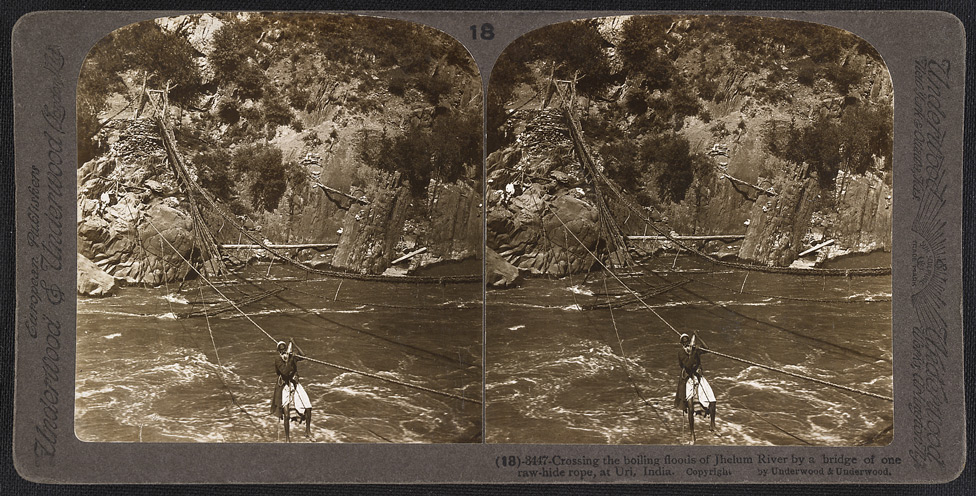
Jhelum River at Uri in Kashmir, 1903

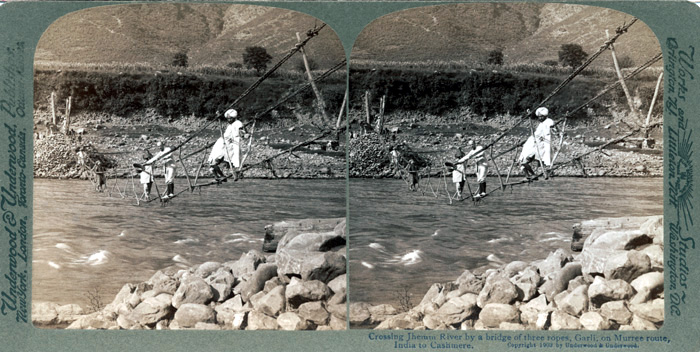
Rope Bridge at Karli, 1908

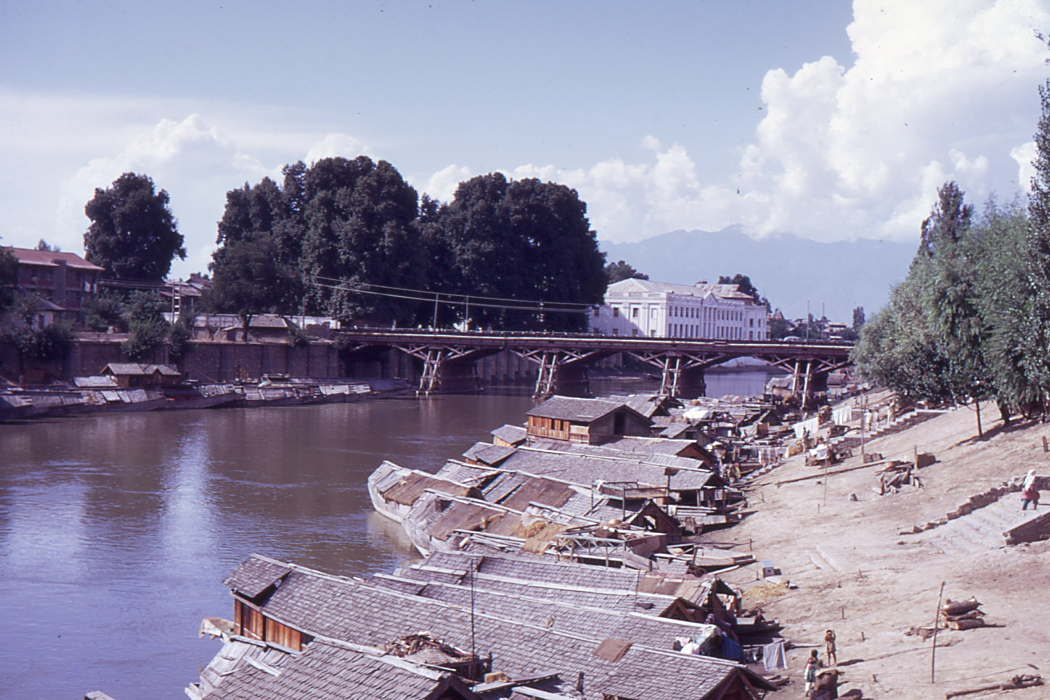
Bridge over the river, Srinagar, 1969

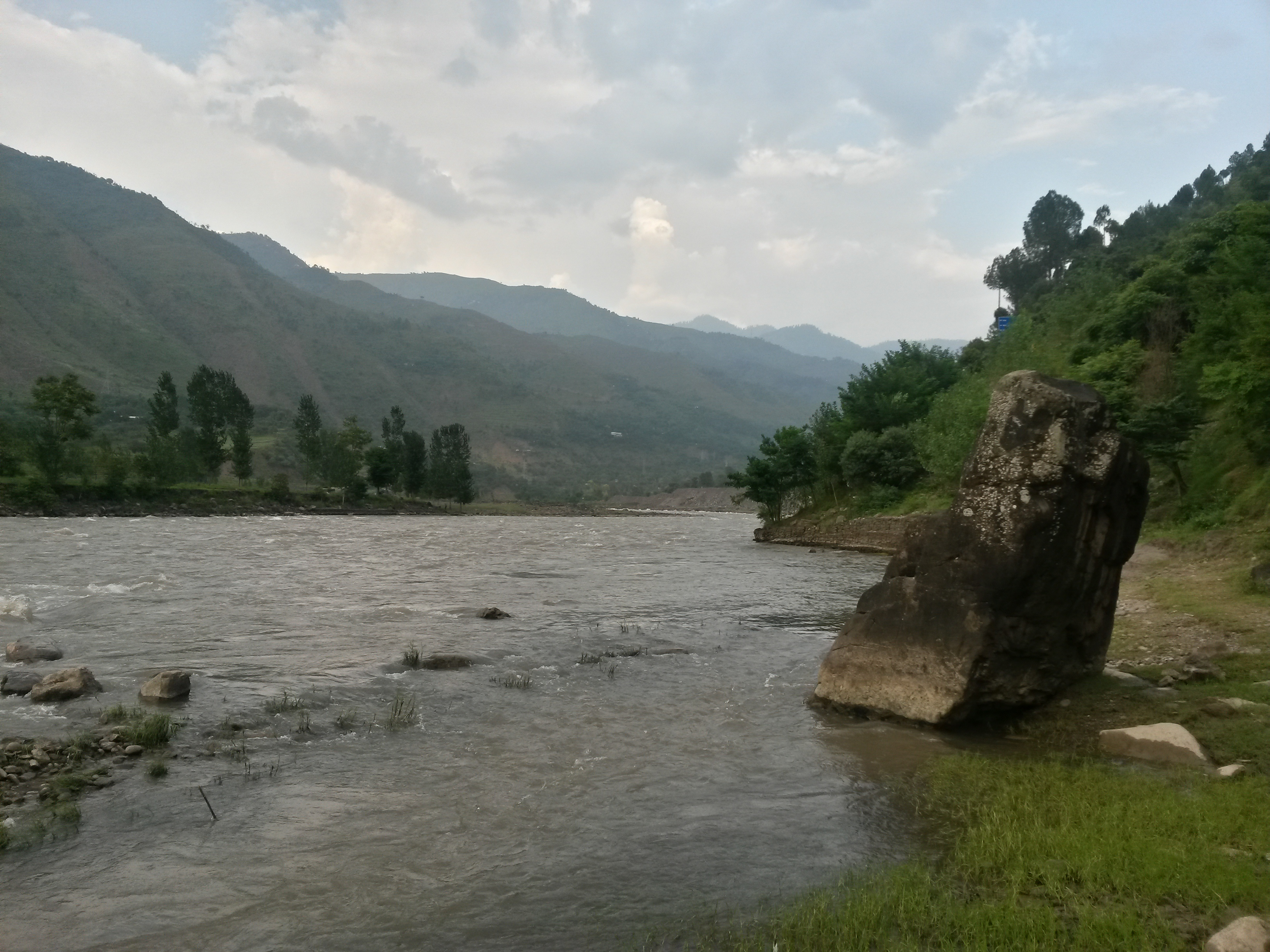
Jhelum river near Muzaffarabad (2014)

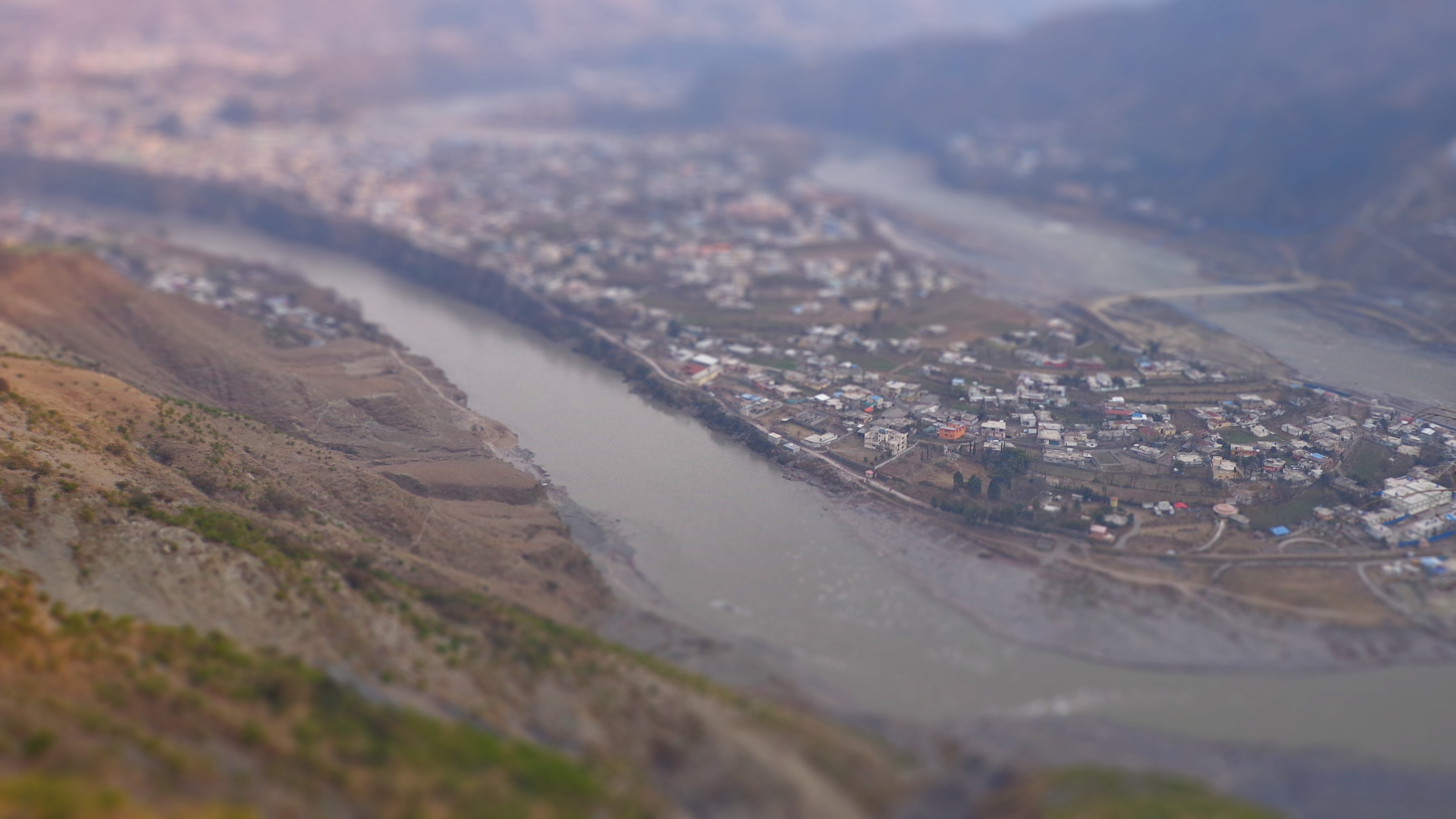
File:River Jehlum, Muzaffarabad

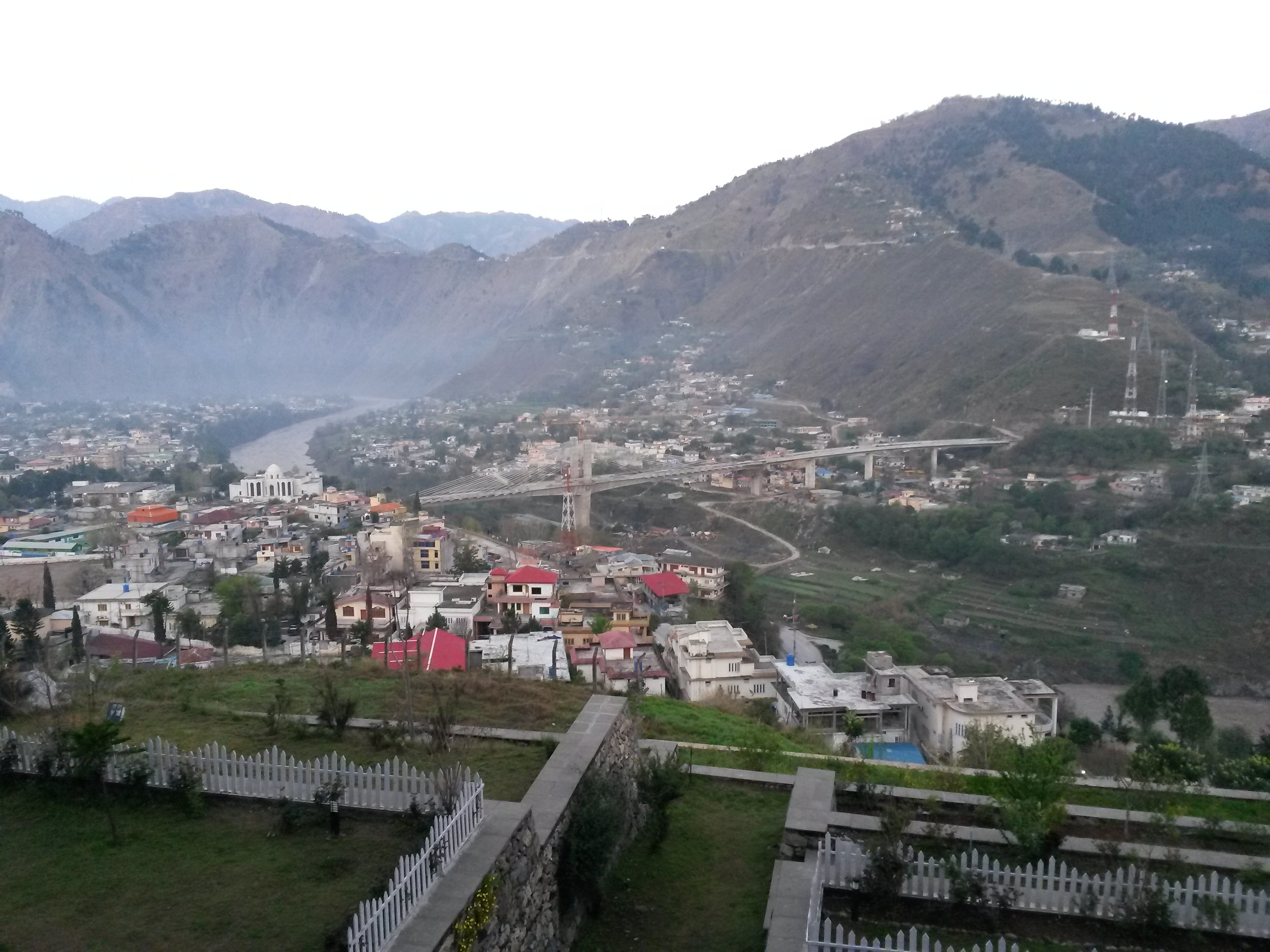
Near Muzaffarabad, 2014

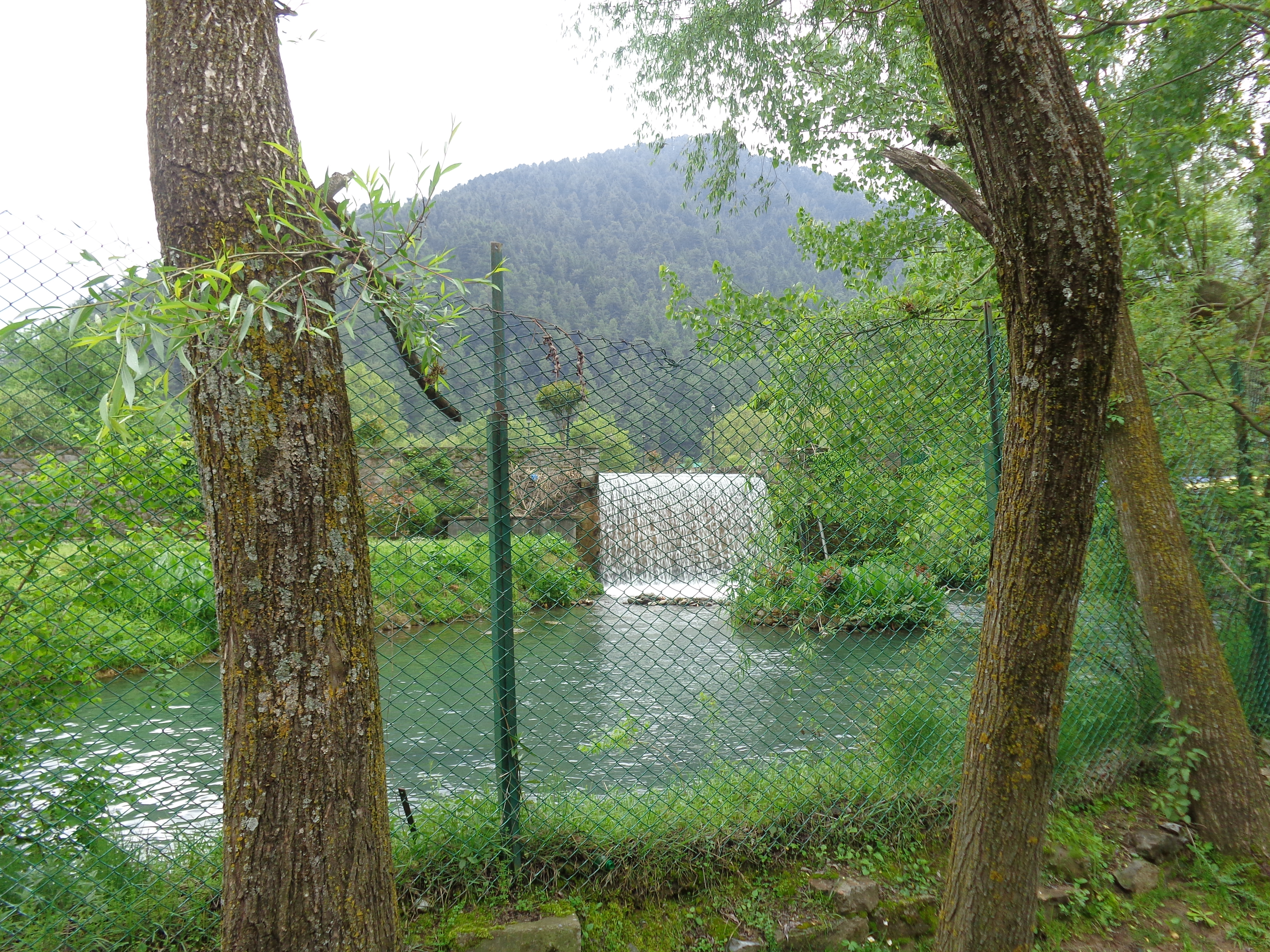
The Jhelum at Verinag, 2014

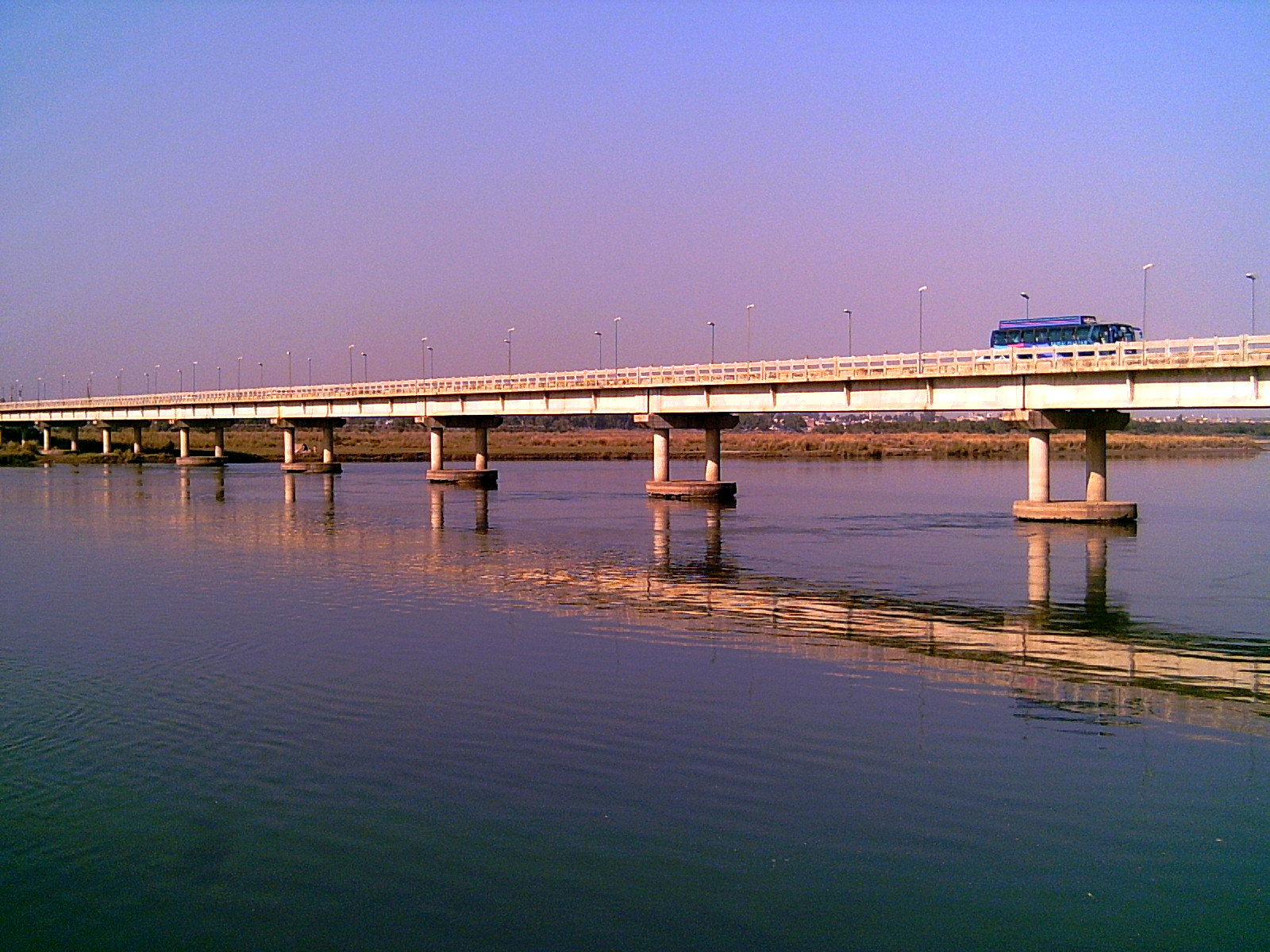
Jhelum River at Jhelum City, 2005

== See also ==
- Rivers of Jammu and Kashmir
- List of rivers of Pakistan
- Beas River
- Indus River
- Kalnai River
- Ravi River
- Satluj River
- Chenab River
