= Chak Nizam =

Chak Nizam Chak Nizām
- Village
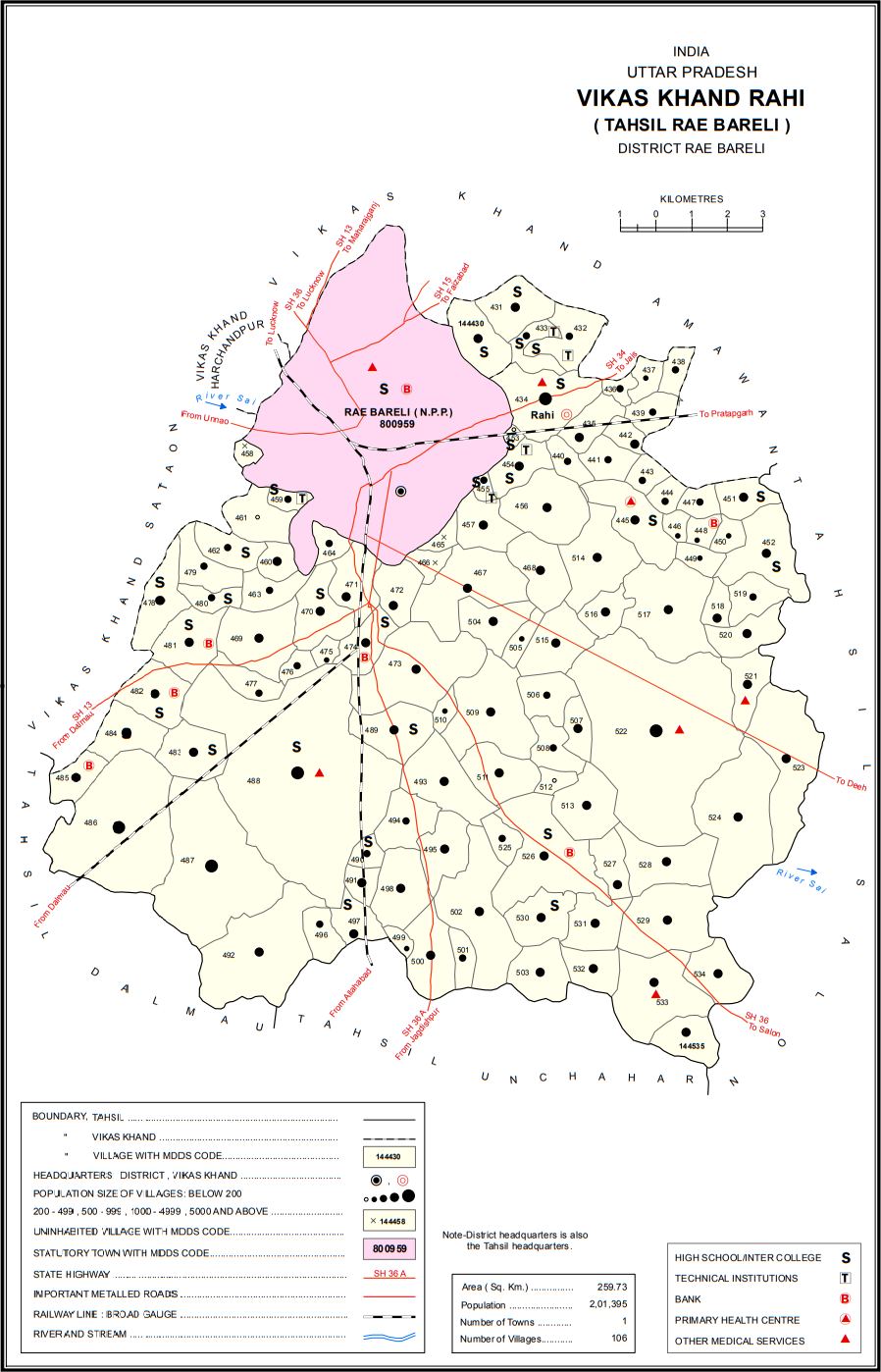
- Map showing Chak Nizam (#494) in Rahi CD block

- Location in Uttar Pradesh, India
- Coordinates: 26.131845°N 81.265625°E
- Country: India
- State: Uttar Pradesh
- District: Raebareli

Area
  - Total: 1.849 km^{2} (0.714 sq mi)

Population (2011)
  - Total: 806
  - Density: 436/km^{2} (1,130/sq mi)

Languages
  - Official: Hindi
- Time zone: UTC+5:30 (IST)
- Vehicle registration: UP-35

Chak Nizam is a village in Rahi block of Rae Bareli district, Uttar Pradesh, India. It is located 8 km from Rae Bareli, the district headquarters. As of 2011, its population was 806 people, in 137 households. It has one primary school, no medical facilities and does not host a weekly haat or a permanent market. It belongs to the nyaya panchayat of Bhaon.

The 1951 census recorded Chak Nizam as comprising 3 hamlets, with a population of 176 people (94 male and 82 female), in 36 households and 33 physical houses. The area of the village was 495 acres. 3 residents were literate, 2 male and 1 female. The village was listed as belonging to the pargana of Rae Bareli South and the thana of Jagatpur.

The 1961 census recorded Chak Nizam as comprising 3 hamlets, with a total population of 208 people (102 male and 106 female), in 45 households and 45 physical houses. The area of the village was given as 495 acres.

The 1981 census recorded Chak Nizam as having a population of 362 people, in 63 households, and having an area of 184.95 hectares. The main staple foods were listed as wheat and rice.

The 1991 census recorded Chak Nizam as having a total population of 474 people (240 male and 234 female), in 76 households and 76 physical houses. The area of the village was listed as 185 hectares. Members of the 0-6 age group numbered 118, or 25% of the total; this group was 48% male (57) and 52% female (61). Members of scheduled castes numbered 205, or 43% of the village's total population, while no members of scheduled tribes were recorded. The literacy rate of the village was 19% (88 men and 2 women). 185 people were classified as main workers (125 men and 60 women), while 32 people were classified as marginal workers (2 men and 30 women); the remaining 257 residents were non-workers. The breakdown of main workers by employment category was as follows: 135 cultivators (i.e. people who owned or leased their own land); 30 agricultural labourers (i.e. people who worked someone else's land in return for payment); 1 worker in livestock, forestry, fishing, hunting, plantations, orchards, etc.; 0 in mining and quarrying; 0 household industry workers; 9 workers employed in other manufacturing, processing, service, and repair roles; 2 construction workers; 1 employed in trade and commerce; 5 employed in transport, storage, and communications; and 2 in other services.
