= Bhaon =

Bhaon Bhāon
- Village
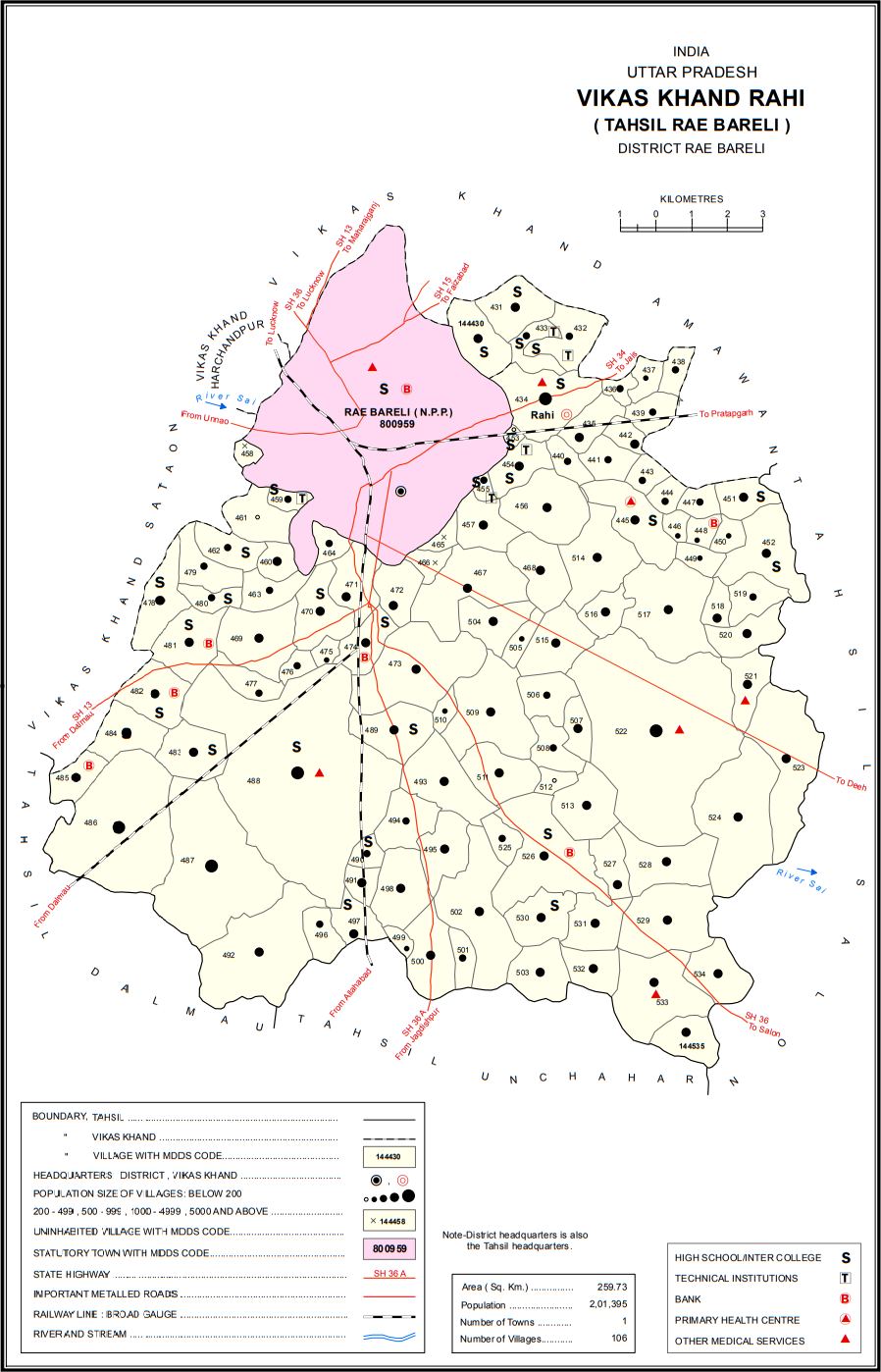
- Map showing Bhaon (#495) in Rahi CD block

- Location in Uttar Pradesh, India
- Coordinates: 26.120064°N 81.263746°E
- Country India: India
- State: Uttar Pradesh
- District: Raebareli

Area
  - Total: 3.85 km^{2} (1.49 sq mi)

Population (2011)
  - Total: 4,161
  - Density: 1,080/km^{2} (2,800/sq mi)

Languages
  - Official: Hindi
- Time zone: UTC+5:30 (IST)
- Vehicle registration: UP-35

Bhaon is a village in Rahi block of Rae Bareli district, Uttar Pradesh, India. It is located 9 km south of Rae Bareli, the district headquarters, on the road to Allahabad. It is located on level ground and the soil is very fertile. As of 2011, it has a population of 4,161 people, in 758 households. It has one primary school and no healthcare facilities.

Bhaon hosts markets twice a week, on Mondays and Fridays, at the Achalganj bazar. The main trade is in grain and goats. The village also hosts a mela annually on Asvina Sudi 14–15.

== History ==
According to legend, Bhaon was founded by Bhawan, the brother of the Bhar chieftain Dal. The Bhars had a fort in the town which was demolished in 820 AH by Ibrahim Shah of the Jaunpur Sultanate, who then built a new masonry fort on the site. However, the Jaunpur fort no longer exists. The place was originally given to Burhan-ud-Din Qittal, but it later became part of the Bais Rana of Khajurgaon's landed estates. In the early 19th century, a masonry mosque was built at Bhaon by Sheikh Abdus Samad.

At the turn of the 20th century, Bhaon was described as being surrounded by orchards; it was no longer an important centre, and the old Jaunpur fort no longer existed at that point. The population in 1901 was 1,456 people, including a Muslim minority of 330.

The 1961 census recorded Bhaon as comprising 8 hamlets, with a total population of 1,599 people (816 male and 783 female), in 346 households and 313 physical houses. The area of the village was given as 940 acres and it had a post office at that point. Average attendance of the Achalganj market was about 500 people and attendance of the annual mela was also about 500 people.

The 1981 census recorded Bhaon (as "Bhaonw") as having a population of 2,148 people, in 426 households, and having an area of 384.87 hectares. The main staple foods were given as wheat and rice.
