= Maninderjeet Singh Bitta =

Indian politician

Maninderjeet Bitta
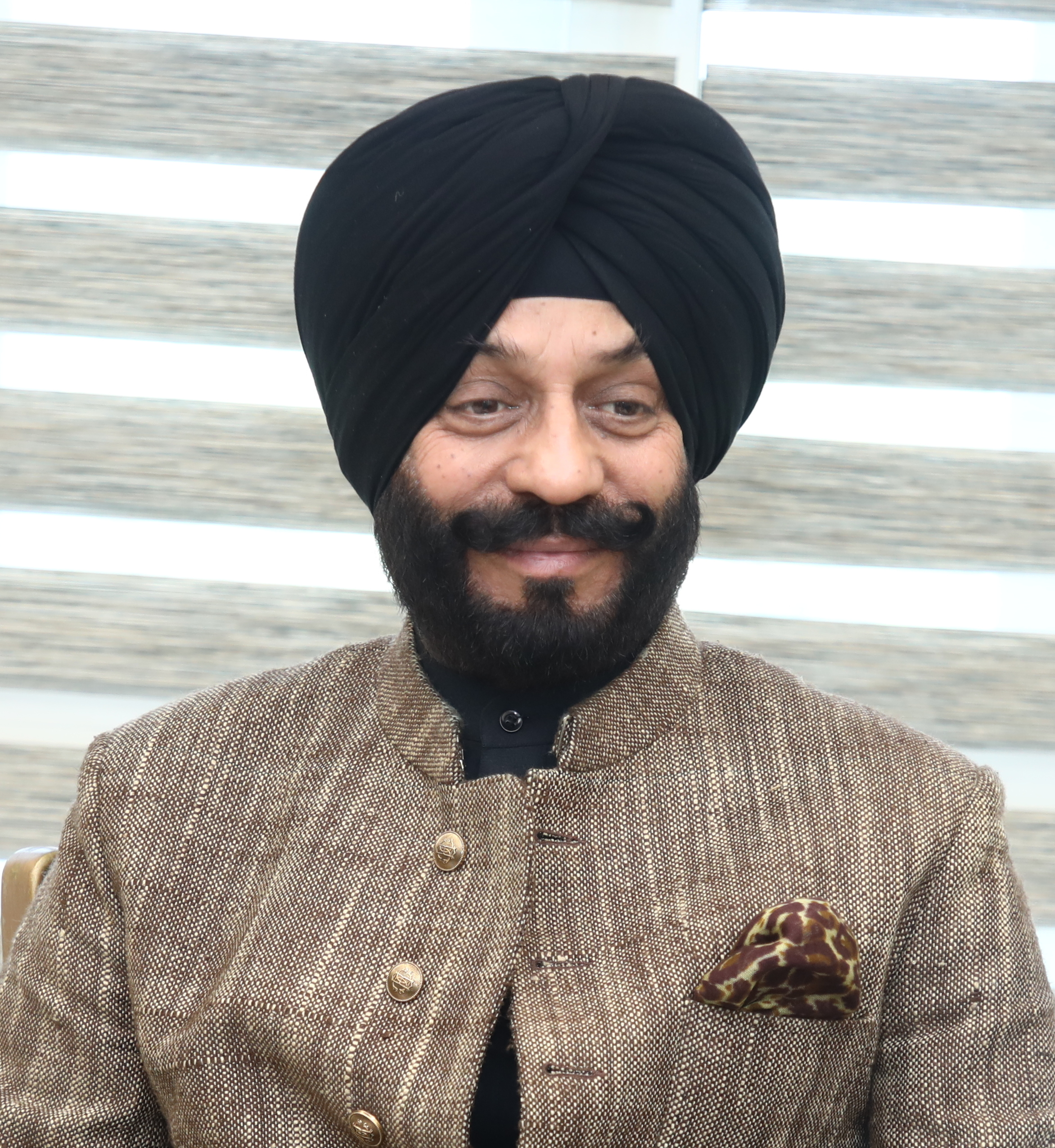
- M.S Bitta
- Born: Maninderjeet Singh Bitta
- Occupation: Chairman of the All-India Anti-Terrorist Front (AIATF)

Maninderjeet Singh Bitta (also M.S. Bitta) is the chairman of the All-India Anti-Terrorist Front (AIATF), and former President of Indian Youth Congress. He was made President of Indian Youth Congress by P. V. Narasimha Rao. Maninderjeet Singh Bitta was a Minister in Punjab Government in the govt of Beant Singh.

== Attacks on his life ==
- 9 May 1992 : Bitta along with his friend Charanjit Singh Bedi was severely injured in a car bombing that killed 13 people in Amritsar on May 9, 1992.
- 11 September 1993 : Bitta survived a deadly attack on him at Indian Youth Congress premises on Raisina Road, New Delhi. The blast occurred at mid-day as Maninderjeet Singh Bitta, then president of the then governing Congress Party's youth wing, left his office in a car. His two bodyguards were among the dead. He escaped with shrapnel wounds to the chest, but 9 people were killed and 36 wounded. Burning tires and pieces of metal and glass were strewn across a 100-yard area near Parliament and many Government buildings. Rescuers pulled mangled bodies from damaged cars as smoke billowed into the sky. Passengers in a passing public bus were wounded. The death toll would probably have been much higher if it had not been raining heavily. After investigation, authorities named Devinder Pal Singh Bhullar, an affiliate of the Khalistan Liberation Force, as one of the persons responsible for the 1993 Raisina Road car bomb and is sentenced to death by hanging. Bhullar's appeal against the conviction was dismissed by the Supreme Court of India on 27 December 2006. His plea for clemency was rejected by the President of India in May 2011. He again asked for commutation of hanging sentence, which was rejected by the Supreme court of India on 12 April 2013. Finally Death penalty of Devinderpal Singh Bhullar commuted to life imprisonment by the Supreme Court on 31 March 2014 on the ground of inordinate delay on part of President to decide their mercy pleas.

== Protection ==
He was earlier provided with Z+ security
