= Pohru River =

River in India

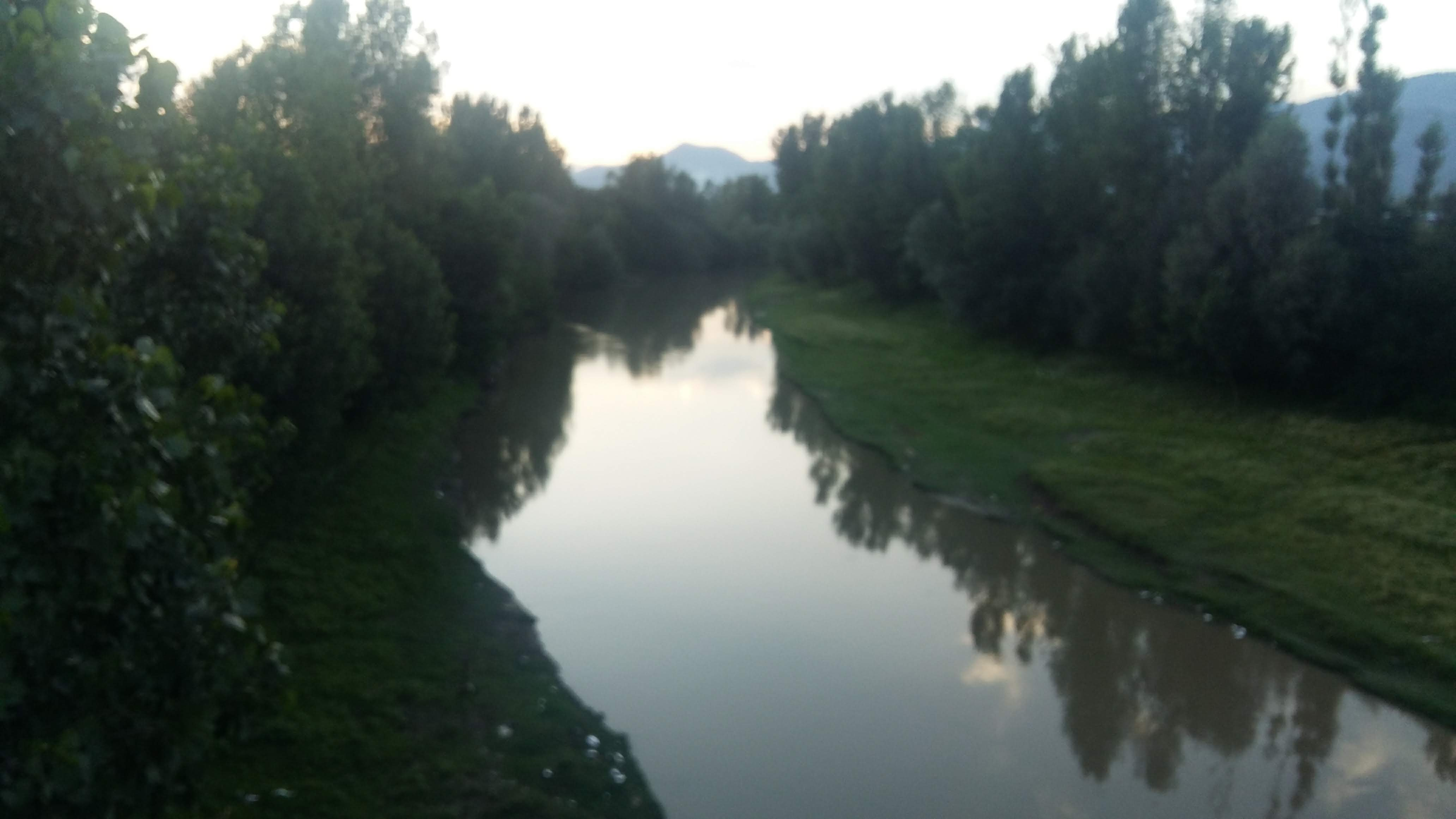

Location
- Country: India
- Union Territory: Jammu and Kashmir
- Region: Kashmir Valley
- District: Baramulla, Kupwara

Physical characteristics
- Mouth: Jhelum River
  - coordinates: 34°15′56″N 74°25′03″E
- Depth
  - minimum: 2feet
  - average: 5feet
  - maximum: 9feet

Basin features
- Tributaries
  - left: Mawer river

The Pohru River (Urdu: پہرو) is a right tributary of Jhelum River that flows through the Kupwara and Baramulla district of Kashmir division in the disputed Kashmir region. Pohru river is formed by joining of Khamil Nallah and Lolab Nallah in the Kupwara town. Khamil Nallah originates from Shamashabri mountains in the Bangus valley and is joined by Budnamal Nallah at Chowkibal. Lolab Nallah called ( lahwal river or lalkul)is formed by confluence of several streams like Khurhama stream, Kalarose stream, Gund Machar stream gogal stream. Mawer River is the main tributary of Pohru river, it originates from Kazinag Mountains and joins Pohru river at Ujroo Village of Langate tehsil. Pohru river passes through many villages where it finally enters into the jehum river near Doabgah sopore town, Baramullah district. Pohru River is one of the tributaries of the river Jhelum.
