= Death sentence of Devinder Pal Singh Bhullar =

Sentence issued by courts of India

Devinder Singh
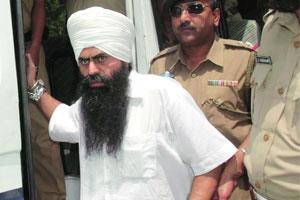
- Bhullar being carried away by police officers.
- Born: Devinder Singh Bhullar; 1965 (age 60–61); Dialpura Bhaika
- Citizenship: Indian
- Occupation: Former Professor of Chemical Engineering at GNE College Ludhiana

Devinder Pal Singh Bhullar (born 26 May 1965 in Punjab, India) was sentenced to death by hanging by a split decision for a 1993 car bombing in Delhi. A chemical engineering professor by profession, he had taught in Ludhiana. A court declared Bhullar guilty under India's Terrorism and Disruptive Activities (Prevention) Act (TADA) of killing nine bystanders in the bombing, which also injured 31 and had intended to kill politician Maninderjeet Singh Bitta. The Supreme Court of India had confirmed Bhullar's death sentence in a fractured and divided decision, and it eventually commuted the sentence to life imprisonment on 31 March 2014, both on the grounds of an unexplained and inordinate delay of eight years in deciding his mercy petition and on the ground of mental illness.

== Bombing and sentencing ==
At mid-day on 11 September 1993, a car bomb exploded outside the offices of the Indian Youth Congress on Raisina Road in New Delhi. The remote-controlled bomb used RDX as explosive and was intended for Maninder Singh Bitta, a vocal critic of Khalistani separatists. Bitta who was leaving the Youth Congress offices in his car and survived with shrapnel wounds to his chest. Two of his bodyguards and seven others were killed.

After investigation, authorities named Bhullar as the bomber responsible for the 1993 Raisina Road car bomb based on his confession, which the defense claimed was taken under duress. Bhullar's sympathizers argue that he was targeted solely for supporting the Khalistani separatist cause and for speaking out against injustices in Punjab during the 1980s, in particular students missing after police encounters, Operation Woodrose and the 1984 anti-Sikh riots. The prosecution's claim that he was part of the proscribed separatist organization, Khalistan Liberation Force is denied by his family and friends.

In the appellate stage of the trial he was found guilty by a majority of 2–1. The presiding judge of the three-judge bench dissented, acquitted Bhullar, and found him not guilty of participating in the 1993 car bomb attack as too much doubt remained on the authenticity of the alleged confession to the Punjab police. The other two judges upheld the death sentence, found Bhullar's confession admissible, and argued that proof "beyond reasonable doubt" should be a "guideline, not a fetish".

Devinder Pal Singh Bhullar has gone in appeal over the judgement of the trial court, and his conviction was upheld at all the stages. Finally, he sought a Presidential pardon, which was granted on ground of inordinate delay in deciding his mercy petition and his schizophrenia.

== Flight to Germany and attempted asylum ==
After the bombing, Bhullar fled to Germany in December 1994 and sought political asylum. The German government rejected his plea in 1995 and extradited him back to India to face charges of terrorism on the condition that Bhullar receive a fair trial and not be subjected to capital punishment. Upon his return to India in 1995, Bhullar was immediately arrested and prosecuted for alleged bombings in Delhi. He was treated as a terrorist and prosecuted under the Terrorism & Disruptive Activities Act (TADA).

Bhullar has been in prison on death row in the two decades since being arrested upon arrival after being deported to India.

== Confession ==
The Indian police in Delhi detained Bhullar once airline staff had handed him over. The police alleged that he volunteered a confession, which was typed on a computer while Bhullar spoke. The authorities claimed the secretary forgot to save the confession on the computer. Terrorist and Disruptive Activities (Prevention) Act requires the handwritten confessions or an audio or video record of it. The authenticity of typed confessions is doubted in the courts.

== Court proceedings ==
In India, Bhullar was prosecuted for the 1993 New Delhi car bombing. He was found guilty by the trial court and sentenced to death by hanging on 25 August 2001. The rest of the accused have been acquitted. Bhullar was then taken before an ‘executive’ magistrate. Terrorist and Disruptive Activities (Prevention) Act requires the confession document be sent to the magistrate before appearance of the person so that the magistrate is in a position to examine it. The confession document was not sent to the magistrate nevertheless the magistrate went on to ask him if he had made the confession. Bhullar wrote to the court that the ‘confession’ was involuntary and obtained under torture and fear of death.

In a 2002 review of the trial, an appeals court upheld Bhullar's death sentence by a split verdict of 2–1. The presiding judge voted to overturn the death penalty on Bhullar, because the testimony of the prosecution witnesses had been at odds with the account of events in Bhullar's self-confession. However, the other judges upheld the death penalty because Bhullar's confession had not been sent to the trial magistrate, it was not the basis for the conviction and Bhullar had withdrawn his confession.

While he was waiting for the death sentence, Bhullar was convicted of other charges by the Punjab Police. However, on 1 December 2006 in the Chandigarh and Haryana High Court the judge acquitted Bhullar on the basis of lack of evidence. R.S. Baswana Additional Sessions Judge held that there was no evidence on file to link the accused with the other alleged crimes and despite the fact that the prosecution had 15 years to gather evidence against Bhullar, they were unable to produce evidence linking Mr Bhullar to the case against him. He had filed a review petition, which was also dismissed on 17 December 2002. Bhullar had then moved a curative petition, which too had been rejected by the Supreme Court on 12 March 2003.

Bhullar's appeal against the conviction was dismissed by the Supreme Court of India on 27 December 2006. His plea for clemency was rejected by the President of India in May 2011. In September 2011, the Supreme Court allowed Bhullar to file an unprecedented second appeal against the death sentence. The amendment to the appeal will argue that Bhullar's first appeal against the death sentence should have been heard by a Constitution Bench of the Supreme Court, rather than a Trial Bench. Additional pleas in the appeal will include the arguments that Bhullar's death sentence had been upheld by a 2–1 split verdict and that Bhullar was mentally ill due to the delay in his execution. The appeal will hence request that his death sentence be commuted to life in prison. In April 2013, the Supreme Court upheld his death penalty after considering a mercy plea.

The writ petition which was filed in Supreme Court of India in April 2013 was only against the plea that delay in execution of death sentence should be a ground for converting death sentence into life imprisonment. The Supreme Court rejected the plea in April 2013, by holding that in terror crime cases pleas of delay in execution of death sentence cannot be a mitigating factor.

In 2005, Bhullar wrote to the German chancellor to put diplomatic pressure on Indian Government to release him. The letter was later made public. Bhullar appealed against his execution on the grounds that his petition for mercy was kept pending by the President of the country for eight years, an unnecessary delay.

On 31 January 2014, the Supreme Court of India issued notice to Central Government on Bhullar's curative plea seeking commuting his death sentence to life imprisonment. The plea was on the grounds of inordinate delay in deciding his mercy plea by the President and his mental health.

On 31 March 2014, a bench of the Supreme Court, headed by Chief Justice P Sathasivam, commuted Bhullar's death sentence to life Imprisonment on the grounds of inordinate delay in deciding his mercy petition and his schizophrenia.

== Campaign for clemency ==
The European Parliament passed a resolution stating that India should abolish the death penalty and grant clemency to Bhullar. Amnesty International has also taken up the cause, launching an "Urgent Appeal" for petitions against the execution.

The Chief Minister Of Delhi, Arvind Kejriwal, wrote to the President of India recommending clemency for Devinder Pal Singh Bhullar.
