= Achabal, Baramulla =

Achabal Achival
- Village
- Location in Jammu and Kashmir, India Achabal (India)
- Coordinates: 34.30°N 74.45°E
- Country: India
- State: Jammu and Kashmir
- District: Baramulla district
- Founder: Achvee'r (ancient ruler)

Government
  - Type: Democratic
  - Body: President's rule

Area
  - Total: 2.9 km^{2} (1.1 sq mi)

Population
  - Total: 5,440 (census 2,011)

Languages
  - Official: Kashmiri, Urdu, Hindi, Dogri, English
- Time zone: UTC+5:30 (IST)
- Postal code: <193201>
- Vehicle registration: JK05

Achabal or Achival is the village in Baramulla district, Jammu and Kashmir. It is around 5 km (3.1 mi) away from Sopore town. The village is surrounded by the villages of like Lorihama, Alsafa Colony, Ladoora and Ferozpora. This village is accessible by the National Highway from Ferozpora-Achabal link road which connects it to Handwara, Kupwara and other northern regions of Kashmir. It is also accessible by Ladoora-Sopore road. There is a branch of Jammu & Kashmir Bank in the main market.

== Education ==
Achabal village has one government-run High School and around 6 middle and primary schools. It has one private high school, Sheikh ul Alam Public School, which is run by the Auqaf Committee. The village has produced many doctors and engineers. As far as education is concerned, the Achabal village has a literacy rate of 83.6% according to census 2011.

== Religion ==
All the people of this village are sunni Muslims. This village has one Jamia Masjid and around six mosques which are located in respective mohallas like Astanpora, Goripora-Nageenpora, Batpora, and Chotipora. Jamia Masjid is located in main chowk Malikpora. Achabal has two Darul Uloom's, one in the main chowk and another in Chotipora.

== Controversies ==
Eid prayers were mostly offered in Eidgah which is located near the bus stand. In recent years there were many controversies regarding the ownership of the said Eidgah between Achabal and neighboring Doabgah. On the intervening night of 9 September 2011, there was a fierce fight between the residents of the two villages, which resulted in huge loss of property. Police had to intervene and the matter is still not resolved.

== Playground ==
There is a large playground located near Government Boys High School which is commonly known as Green Park Field (Labar shath) where every year, tournaments of cricket & football are held by local residents. This ground is large as compared to other two small grounds which are located in Goripora and another near Sheikhul Alam high school. A water stream, Vij flows on three sides of Green Park Field (Labar shot) playground.

== Healthcare ==
This village has one Government Primary health centre which almost has all the basic needs. So patients prefer Sopore and Baramulla towns which have good healthcare facilities. The village has 3 clinics of local resident doctors, one in Nageenpora run by Dr. Gh Hassan Malik (CMO), second in Astanpora run by Dr. Mukhtar Baba (CMO) and the third in Malikpora near Jamia Masjid run by Dr. Firdous Malik.

The president of Doctors Association Kashmir Chapter (DAK) also hails from Achabal namely Dr. Nisaar ul Hassan Malik who is working as Professor GMC Srinagar.
