= Khajuri =

Khajuri or Khajoori (lit. 'date palm') is a common place name in parts of India and Nepal, it may refer to:

- Khajuri, Bhopal, a village in Bhopal district, Madhya Pradesh, India
- Khajuri, Dildarnagar, a village in Dildarnagar Kamsar, Uttar Pradesh, India
- Khajuri, Gulbarga, a village in Gulbarga district of Karnataka, India
- Khajuri Chanha, a village development committee in Dhanusa District, Nepal
- Khajuri, Kalaburagi, a village of Kalaburagi district, Karnataka, India
- Khajuri Kalan, a village of Allahabad district, Uttar Pradesh, India
- Khajuri Khurd, a village of Allahabad district, Uttar Pradesh, India
- Khajoori Khas, a town in Delhi, India
  - Khajuri Khas metro station
- Khajuri, Raebareli, a village in Raebareli district, Uttar Pradesh, India
- Khajoori Sadak, a village in Madhya Pradesh, India
- Khajuri, Yamunanagar, a village in Yamunanagar district, Haryana, India
- Rani Khajuri, a village in Madhya Pradesh, India

== Other uses ==
- Khajuri (food), a fried snack food in Nepal

== See also ==
- Khajuria's leaf-nosed bat, a species of bat found in India
- Khajurgaon, a village in Uttar Pradesh, India
- Khajuria, Bihar, a village in Bihar, India
- Khajuria Ramdas, a village in Madhya Pradesh, India
- Khajuria Ranku, a village in Madhya Pradesh, India
- Khajuria Sarki, a village in Uttar Pradesh, India
- Khajuriya Kalan, a village in Madhya Pradesh, India
- Khajoor Pe Atke, a 2018 Indian film
