= Bela Tekai =

Bela Tekai Bela Tikai
- Village
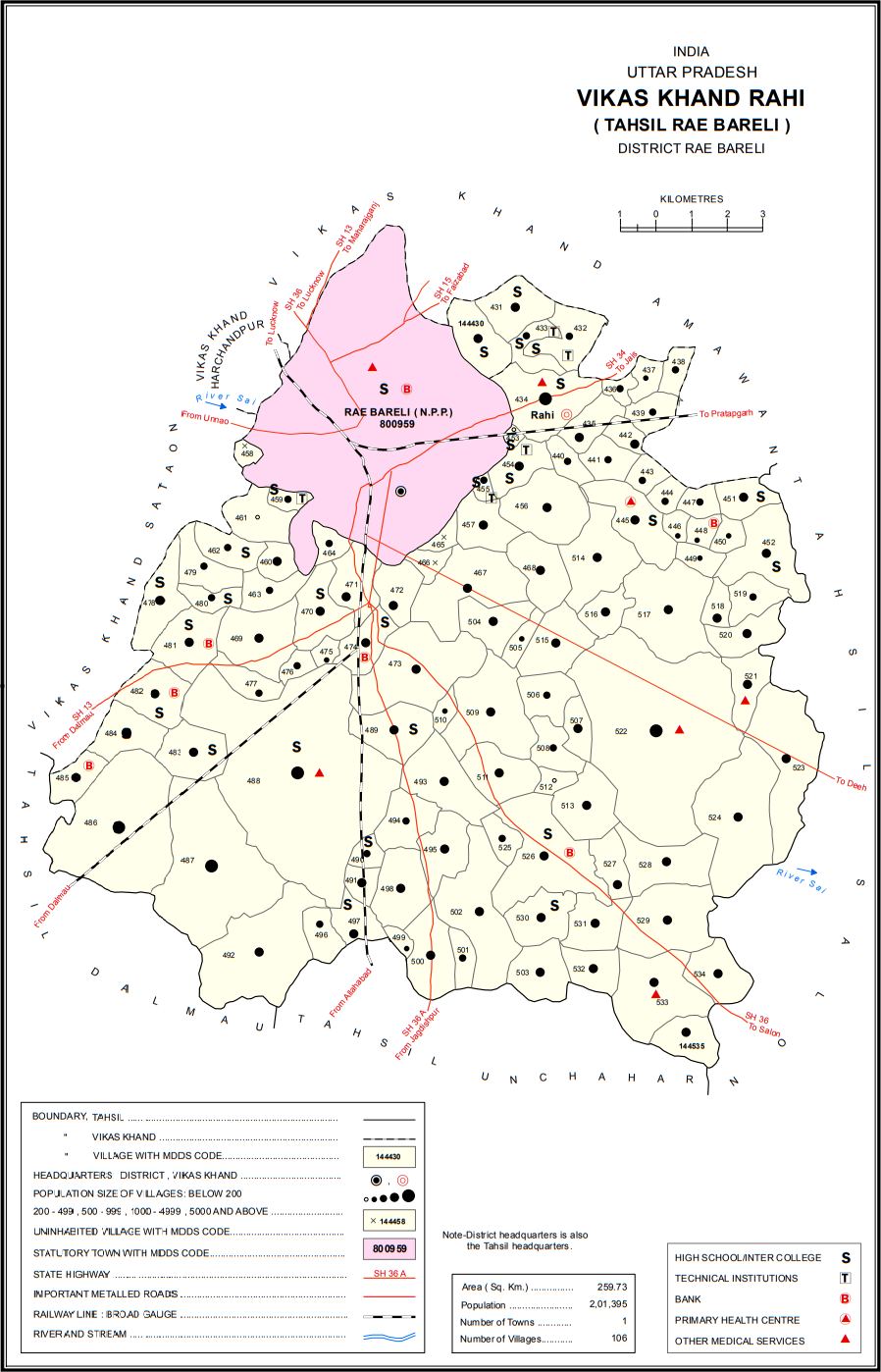
- Map showing Bela Tekai (#492) in Rahi CD block

- Location in Uttar Pradesh, India
- Coordinates: 26.101108°N 81.212831°E
- Country: India
- State: Uttar Pradesh
- District: Raebareli

Area
  - Total: 6.61 km^{2} (2.55 sq mi)

Population (2011)
  - Total: 4,634
  - Density: 701/km^{2} (1,820/sq mi)

Languages
  - Official: Hindi
- Time zone: UTC+5:30 (IST)
- Vehicle registration: UP-35

Bela Tekai is a village in Rahi block of Rae Bareli district, Uttar Pradesh, India. It is located 14 km from Rae Bareli, the district headquarters. As of 2011, its population comprised 5,928 people, in 1,071 households. The village has 3 primary schools. However, it has no medical facilities, weekly haat or permanent market. It belongs to the nyaya panchayat of Bela Bhela.

The 1951 census recorded Bela Tekai as comprising 9 hamlets, with a total population of 1,470 people (774 male and 696 female), in 335 households and 330 physical houses. The area of the village was given as 1,663 acres. 104 residents were literate, 98 male and 6 female. The village was listed as belonging to the pargana of Rae Bareli South and the thana of Jagatpur.

The 1961 census recorded Bela Tekai as comprising 9 hamlets, with a total population of 1,841 people (967 male and 874 female), in 379 households and 353 physical houses. The area of the village was given as 1,663 acres.

The 1981 census recorded Bela Tekai (as "Bela Tikai") as having a population of 2,455 people, in 484 households, and having an area of 660.47 hectares. The main staple foods were listed as wheat and rice.

The 1991 census recorded Bela Tekai as having a total population of 3,025 people (1,524 male and 1,501 female), in 512 households and 503 physical houses. The area of the village was listed as 653 hectares. Members of the 0-6 age group numbered 637, or 21% of the total; this group was 51% male (324) and 49% female (313). Members of scheduled castes numbered 776, or 26% of the village's total population, while no members of scheduled tribes were recorded. The literacy rate of the village was 27% (627 men and 196 women). 795 people were classified as main workers (758 men and 37 women), while 152 people were classified as marginal workers (12 men and 140 women); the remaining 2,078 residents were non-workers. The breakdown of main workers by employment category was as follows: 540 cultivators (i.e. people who owned or leased their own land); 151 agricultural labourers (i.e. people who worked someone else's land in return for payment); 13 workers in livestock, forestry, fishing, hunting, plantations, orchards, etc.; 0 in mining and quarrying; 3 household industry workers; 15 workers employed in other manufacturing, processing, service, and repair roles; 11 construction workers; 16 employed in trade and commerce; 7 employed in transport, storage, and communications; and 39 in other services.
