= Chandauli (disambiguation) =

Chandauli may refer to the following places in India:

- Chandauli, Uttar Pradesh
  - Chandauli district
  - Chandauli Lok Sabha constituency
  - Chandauli Majhwar railway station
- Chandauli, Jagatpur, Raebareli, Uttar Pradesh
- Chandauli, Sataon, Uttar Pradesh
