= Sarai Sri Bakhsh =

Sarai Sri Bakhsh Saray Sri Bux
- Village
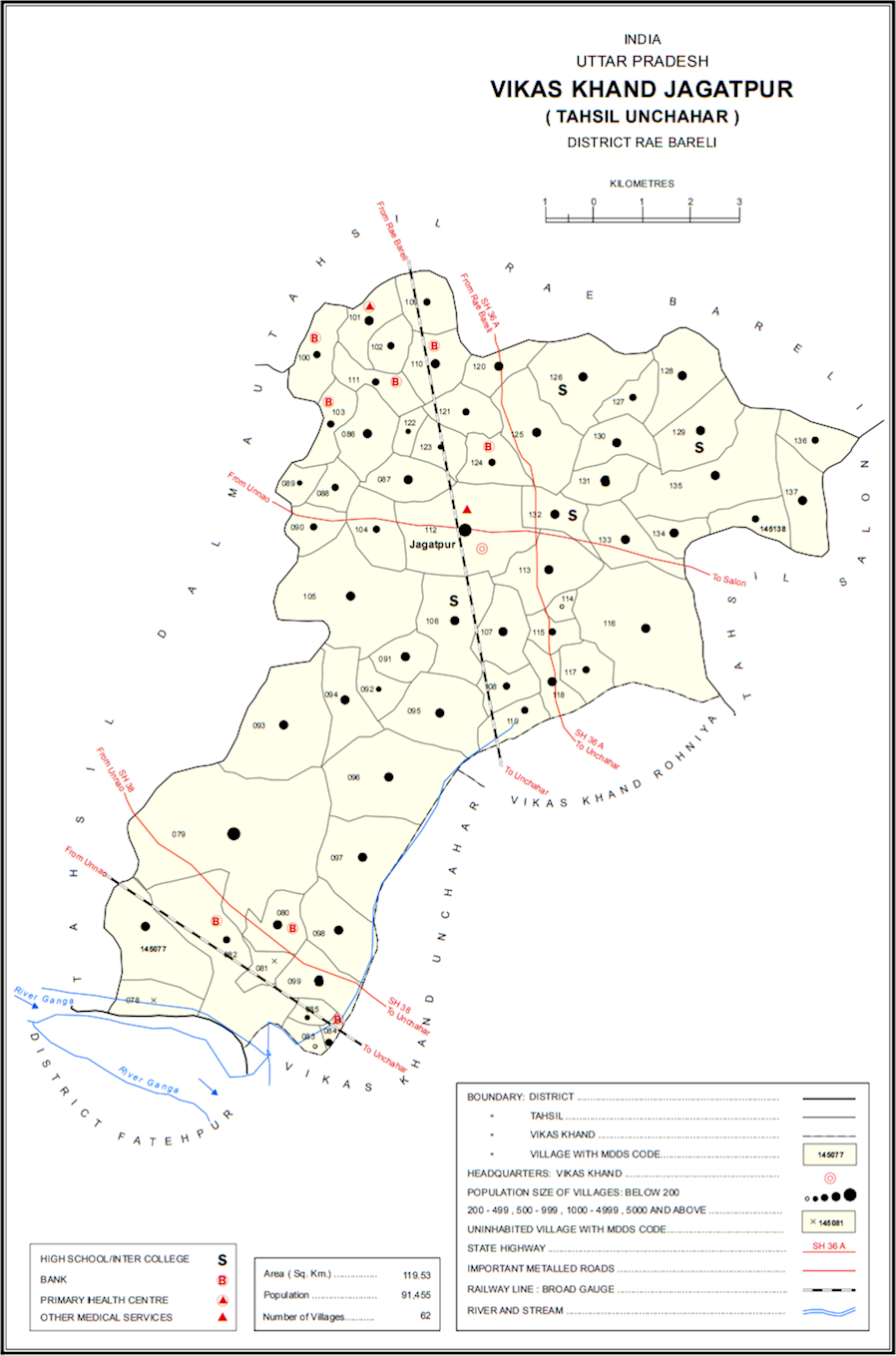
- Map showing Sarai Sri Bakhsh (#086) in Jagatpur CD block

- Location in Uttar Pradesh, India
- Coordinates: 26.075068°N 81.239221°E
- Country India: India
- State: Uttar Pradesh
- District: Raebareli

Area
  - Total: 1.69 km^{2} (0.65 sq mi)

Population (2011)
  - Total: 1,671
  - Density: 989/km^{2} (2,560/sq mi)

Languages
  - Official: Hindi
- Time zone: UTC+5:30 (IST)
- Vehicle registration: UP-35

Sarai Sri Bakhsh is a village in Jagatpur block of Rae Bareli district, Uttar Pradesh, India. As of 2011, it has a population of 1,671 people, in 260 households. It has one primary school and no healthcare facilities.

The 1961 census recorded Sarai Sri Bakhsh (as "Sarai Siri Bakhsh") as comprising 4 hamlets, with a total population of 851 people (419 male and 432 female), in 174 households and 161 physical houses. The area of the village was given as 423 acres.

The 1981 census recorded Sarai Sri Bakhsh (as "Sarai Sri Box") as having a population of 1,124 people, in 237 households, and having an area of 168.35 hectares. The main staple foods were listed as wheat and rice.
