= Gaura Lakhmi =

- Village
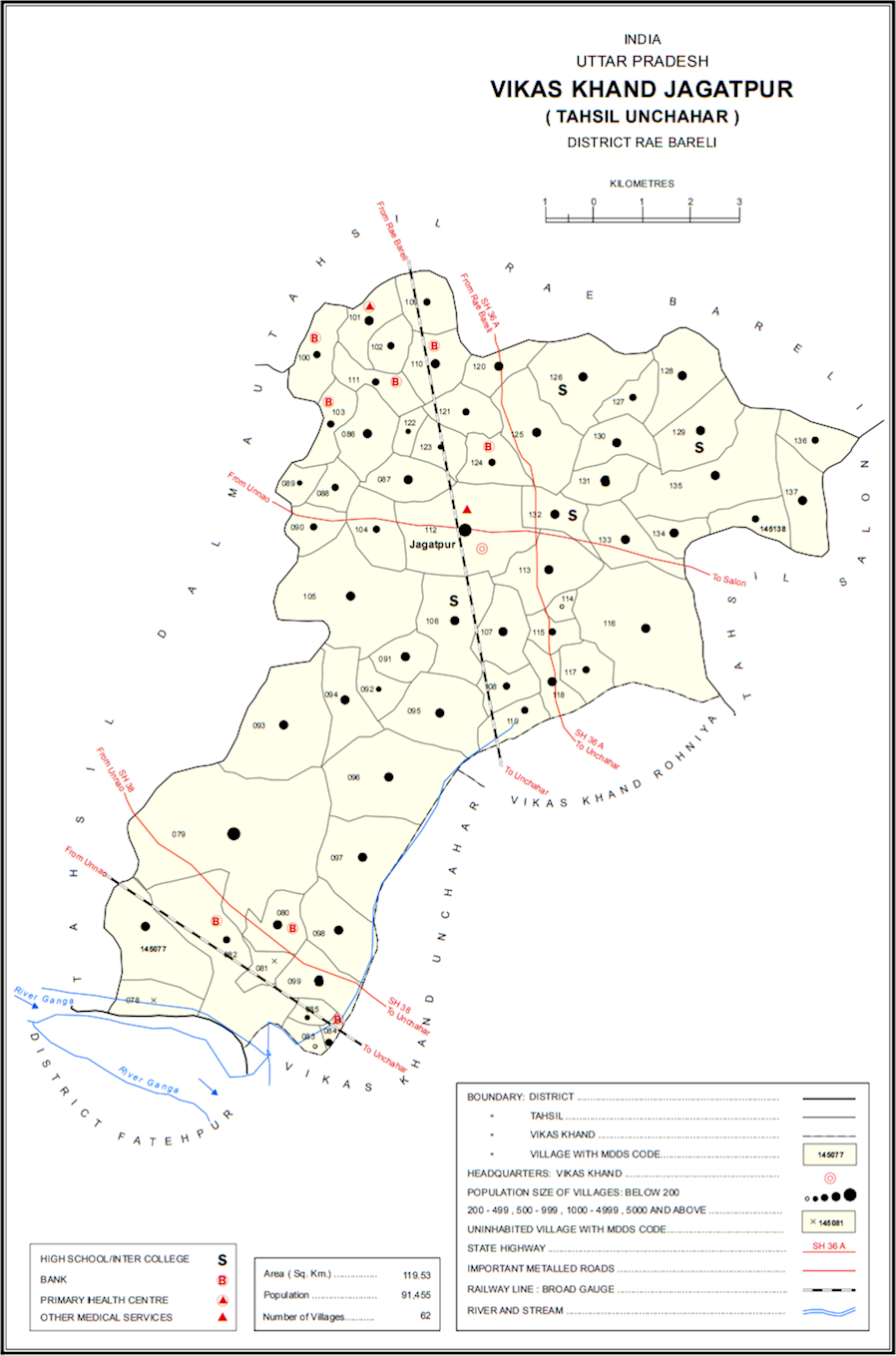
- Map showing Gaura Lakhmi (#100) in Jagatpur CD block

- Location in Uttar Pradesh, India
- Coordinates: 26.083398°N 81.228528°E
- Country India: India
- State: Uttar Pradesh
- District: Raebareli

Area
  - Total: 1.77 km^{2} (0.68 sq mi)

Population (2011)
  - Total: 929
  - Density: 525/km^{2} (1,360/sq mi)

Languages
  - Official: Hindi
- Time zone: UTC+5:30 (IST)
- Vehicle registration: UP-35

Gaura Lakhmi is a village in Jagatpur block of Rae Bareli district, Uttar Pradesh, India. As of 2011, it has a population of 929 people, in 159 households. It has one primary school and no healthcare facilities.

The 1961 census recorded Gaura Lakhmi (as "Gaura Lakhami") as comprising 4 hamlets, with a total population of 329 people (171 male and 158 female), in 66 households and 64 physical houses. The area of the village was given as 443 acres.

The 1981 census recorded Gaura Lakhmi (as "Gaura Lakhami") as having a population of 550 people, in 99 households, and having an area of 179.27 hectares (443.0 acres). The main staple foods were listed as wheat and rice.
