= Sudamanpur =

Sudamanpur Sudāmānpur
- Village
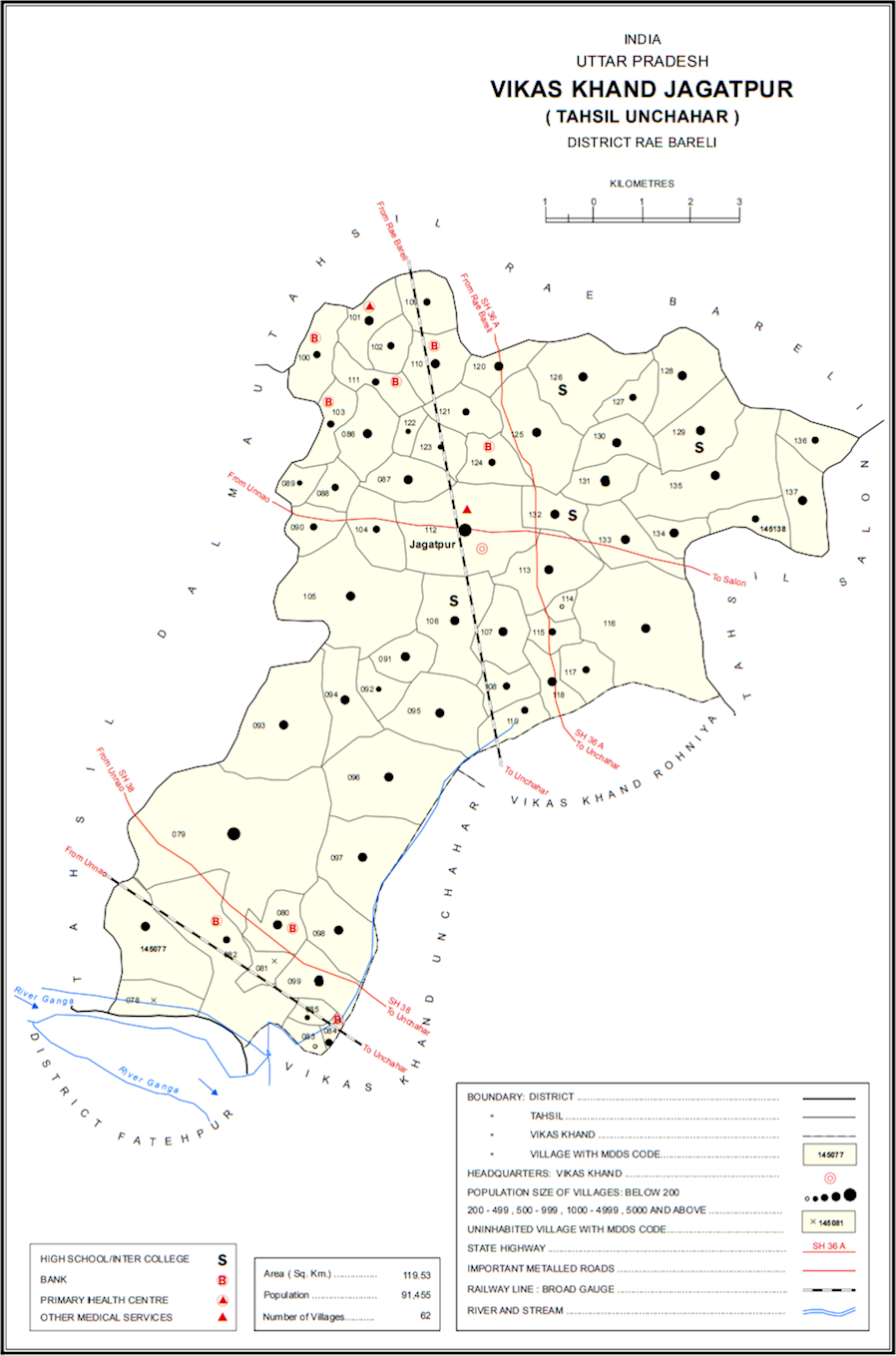
- Map showing Sudamanpur (#079) in Jagatpur CD block

- Location in Uttar Pradesh, India
- Coordinates: 26.996685°N 81.207566°E
- Country India: India
- State: Uttar Pradesh
- District: Raebareli

Area
  - Total: 9.832 km^{2} (3.796 sq mi)

Population (2011)
  - Total: 6,986
  - Density: 710.5/km^{2} (1,840/sq mi)

Languages
  - Official: Hindi
- Time zone: UTC+5:30 (IST)
- Vehicle registration: UP-35

Sudamanpur is a village in Jagatpur block of Rae Bareli district, Uttar Pradesh, India. It is located off the main road, a bit north of the Ganges, and is in low-lying ground broken by ravines. As of 2011, it has a population of 6,986 people, in 1,278 households. It has 3 primary schools and no healthcare facilities.

Sudamanpur hosts a large mela annually during the month of Sawan in honour of the Bhar folk hero Kakoran. The fair lasts for 15 days and draws thousands of visitors. Livestock are bought and sold at the event. The village also has a temple dedicated to Kakoran. Sudamanpur also hosts a market twice per week, on Wednesdays and Sundays. Cloth and vegetables are the main items traded.

== History ==
Sudamanpur was supposedly founded by, and named after, a Janwar named Sudaman Singh sometime around the middle of the 14th century. At the turn of the 20th century, Sudamanpur was described as a large village with many orchards on its outskirts. It was held by the Bais taluqdar of Chandania. The Kakoran mela was described as having an average attendance of around 4,000 people at the time. As of 1901, Sudamanpur's population was 2,273 people, a majority of whom were Ahirs.

The 1961 census recorded Sudamanpur (as "Sudamapur") as comprising 20 hamlets, with a total population of 2,883 people (1,512 male and 1,371 female), in 601 households and 568 physical houses. The area of the village was given as 2,520 acres and it had a post office at that point. Average attendance of the twice-weekly market was about 250 people.

The 1981 census recorded Sudamanpur (as "Sudamapur") as having a population of 4,105 people, in 840 households, and having an area of 1,019.84 hectares. The main staple foods were listed as wheat and rice.
