= Bela Bhela =

Bela Bhela Uttarpāra
- Village
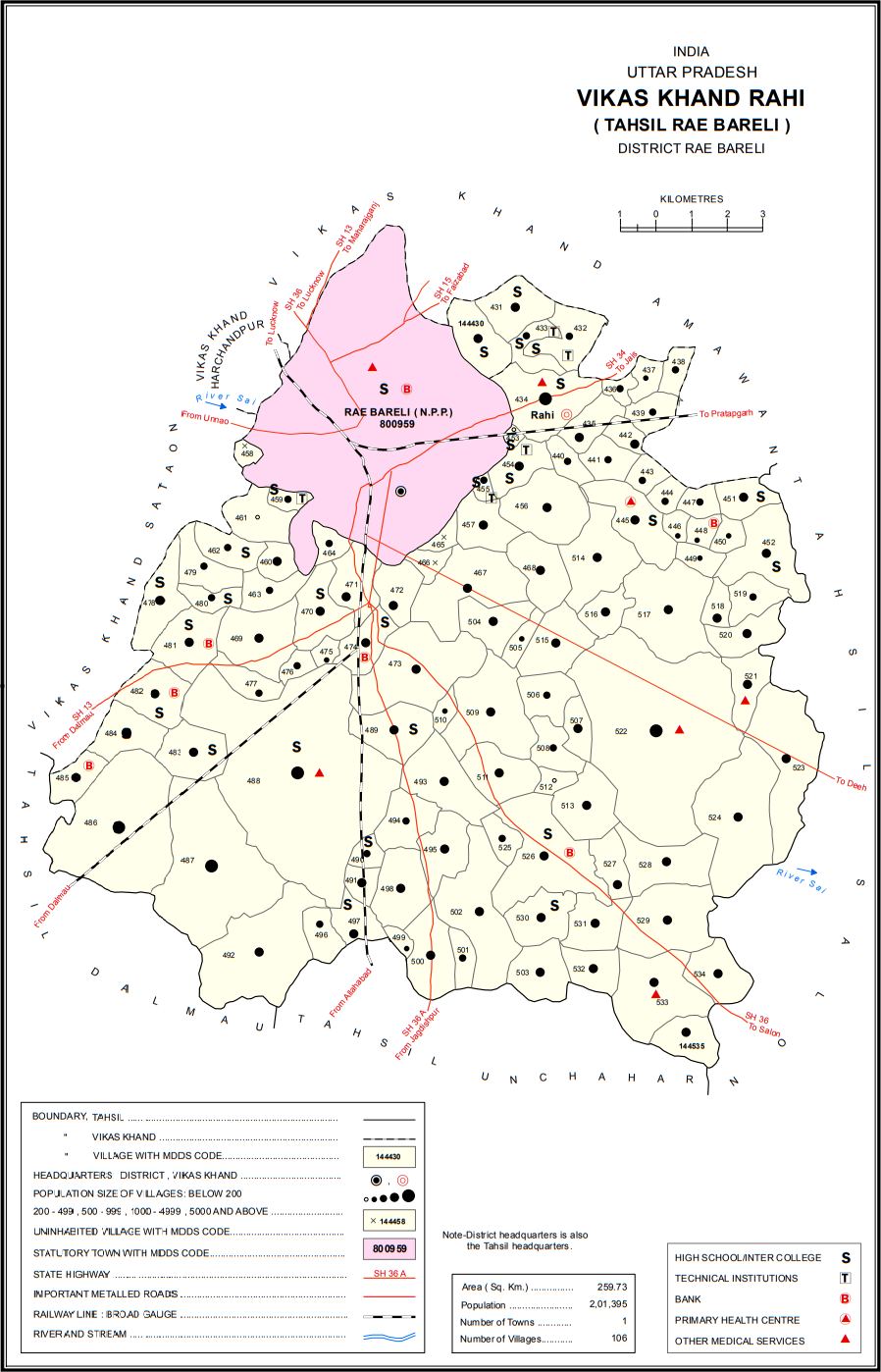
- Map showing Bela Bhela (#488) in Rahi CD block

- Location in Uttar Pradesh, India
- Coordinates: 26.133829°N 81.227067°E
- Country: India
- State: Uttar Pradesh
- District: Raebareli

Area
  - Total: 21.189 km^{2} (8.181 sq mi)

Population (2011)
  - Total: 16,623
  - Density: 784.51/km^{2} (2,031.9/sq mi)

Languages
  - Official: Hindi
- Time zone: UTC+5:30 (IST)
- Vehicle registration: UP-35

Bela Bhela, also called Uttarpara, is a village in Rahi block of Rae Bareli district, Uttar Pradesh, India. It is located 9 km from Rae Bareli, the district headquarters, east of the road to Dalmau. It lies in a belt of stiff clay soil which is highly productive agriculturally and is interspersed with wetlands and patches of barren usar soil. Bela Bhela is a large village consisting of many hamlets. As of 2011, Bela Bhela has a total population of 16,623 people, in 3,004 households. It has one primary school and one medical clinic.

== History ==
At the turn of the 20th century, Bela Bhela was described as a large village whose lands were well-cultivated and "amply" irrigated by several tanks and numerous wells. It had a school and hosted markets twice per week. Bela Bhela then formed the main village in the zamindari estate of Sardar Narain Singh, a descendant of the Punjabi nobleman Maharaja Chhattar Singh. It had previously been part of Rana Beni Madho Bakhsh's lands. The 1901 census recorded a population of 4,803 residents in Bela Bhela; almost all of them were Hindus and many of them belonged to the Ahir community.

The 1951 census recorded Bela Bhela as comprising 32 hamlets, with a total population of 5,429 people (2,774 male and 2,655 female), in 1,154 households and 1,148 physical houses. The area of the village was given as 5,453 acres. 213 residents were literate, 208 male and 5 female. The village was listed as belonging to the pargana of Rae Bareli South and the thana of Jagatpur. The village's primary school had an attendance of 182 students as of 1 January of that year.

The 1961 census recorded Bela Bhela (as "Bela Dhela") as comprising 32 hamlets, with a total population of 6,281 people (3,236 male and 3,045 female), in 1,344 households and 1,240 physical houses. The area of the village was given as 5,453 acres and it had a medical practitioner at that point.

The 1981 census recorded Bela Bhela as having a population of 9,003 people, in 1,170 households, and having an area of 2,154.61 hectares. The main staple foods were listed as wheat and rice.

The 1991 census recorded Bela Bhela as having a total population of 11,334 people (5,970 male and 5,364 female), in 2,058 households and 2,044 physical houses. The area of the village was listed as 2,066 hectares. Members of the 0-6 age group numbered 2,306, or 20% of the total; this group was 50% male (1,162) and 50% female (1,144). Members of scheduled castes numbered 2,930, or 26% of the village's total population, while no members of scheduled tribes were recorded. The literacy rate of the village was 25% (2,203 men and 618 women). 3,969 people were classified as main workers (3,105 men and 864 women), while 580 people were classified as marginal workers (35 men and 545 women); the remaining 6,785 residents were non-workers. The breakdown of main workers by employment category was as follows: 2,768 cultivators (i.e. people who owned or leased their own land); 634 agricultural labourers (i.e. people who worked someone else's land in return for payment); 33 workers in livestock, forestry, fishing, hunting, plantations, orchards, etc.; 0 in mining and quarrying; 17 household industry workers; 139 workers employed in other manufacturing, processing, service, and repair roles; 30 construction workers; 99 employed in trade and commerce; 51 employed in transport, storage, and communications; and 198 in other services.
