= Bhikh =

- Village
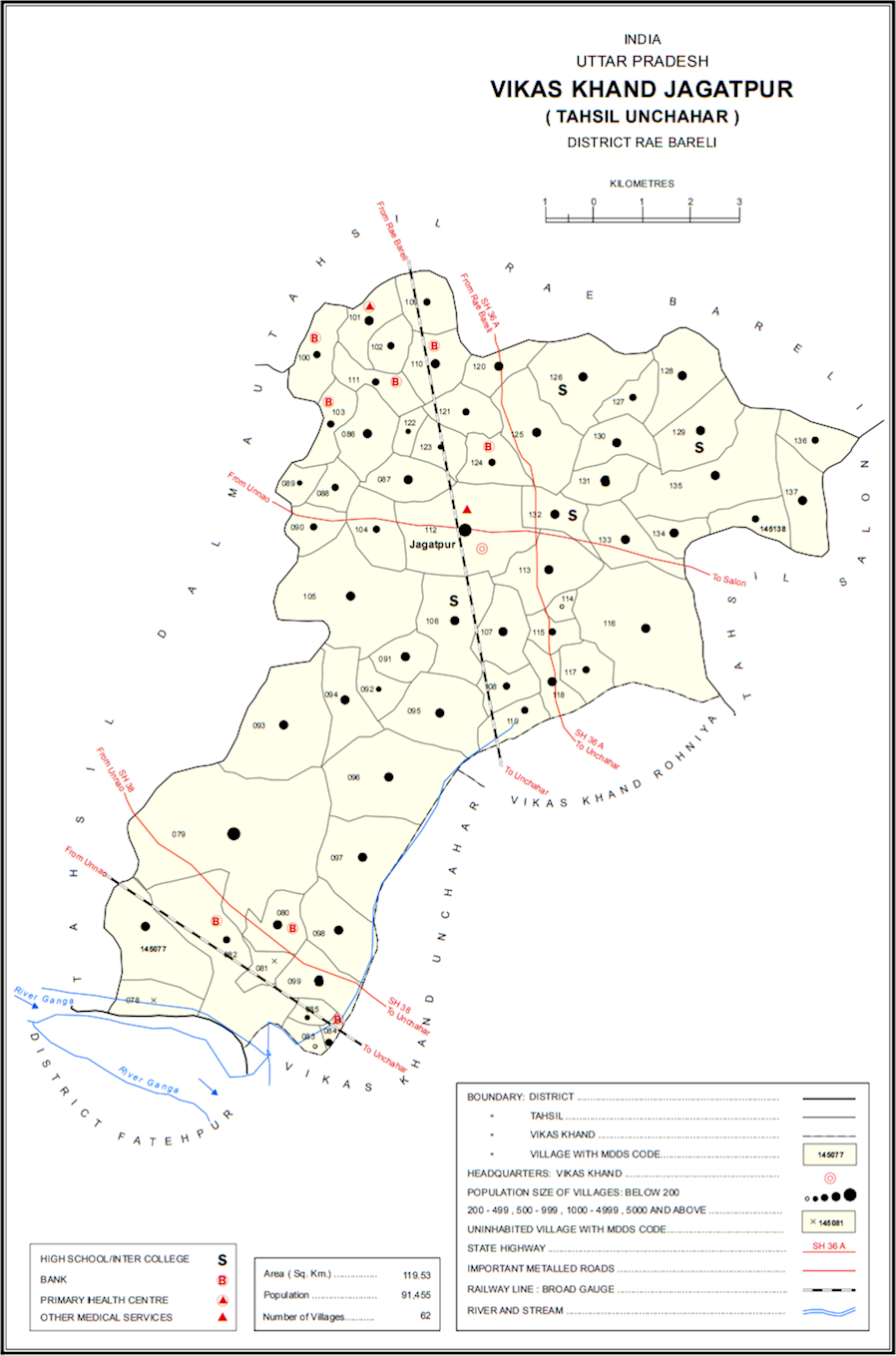
- Map showing Bhikh (#125) in Jagatpur CD block

- Location in Uttar Pradesh, India
- Coordinates: 26.071088°N 81.281568°E
- Country India: India
- State: Uttar Pradesh
- District: Raebareli

Area
  - Total: 3.06 km^{2} (1.18 sq mi)

Population (2011)
  - Total: 2,546
  - Density: 832/km^{2} (2,150/sq mi)

Languages
  - Official: Hindi
- Time zone: UTC+5:30 (IST)
- Vehicle registration: UP-35

Bhikh is a village in Jagatpur block of Rae Bareli district, Uttar Pradesh, India. It is located 20 km from Raebareli, the district headquarters. As of 2011, it has a population of 2,546 people, in 439 households. It has one primary school and no healthcare facilities.

The 1961 census recorded Bhikh as comprising 8 hamlets, with a total population of 1,172 people (618 male and 554 female), in 229 households and 220 physical houses. The area of the village was given as 791 acres.

The 1981 census recorded Bhikh as having a population of 1,553 people, in 302 households, and having an area of 320.13 hectares. The main staple foods were listed as wheat and rice.
