= Sikandarpur, Jagatpur, Raebareli =

Sikandarpur
- Village
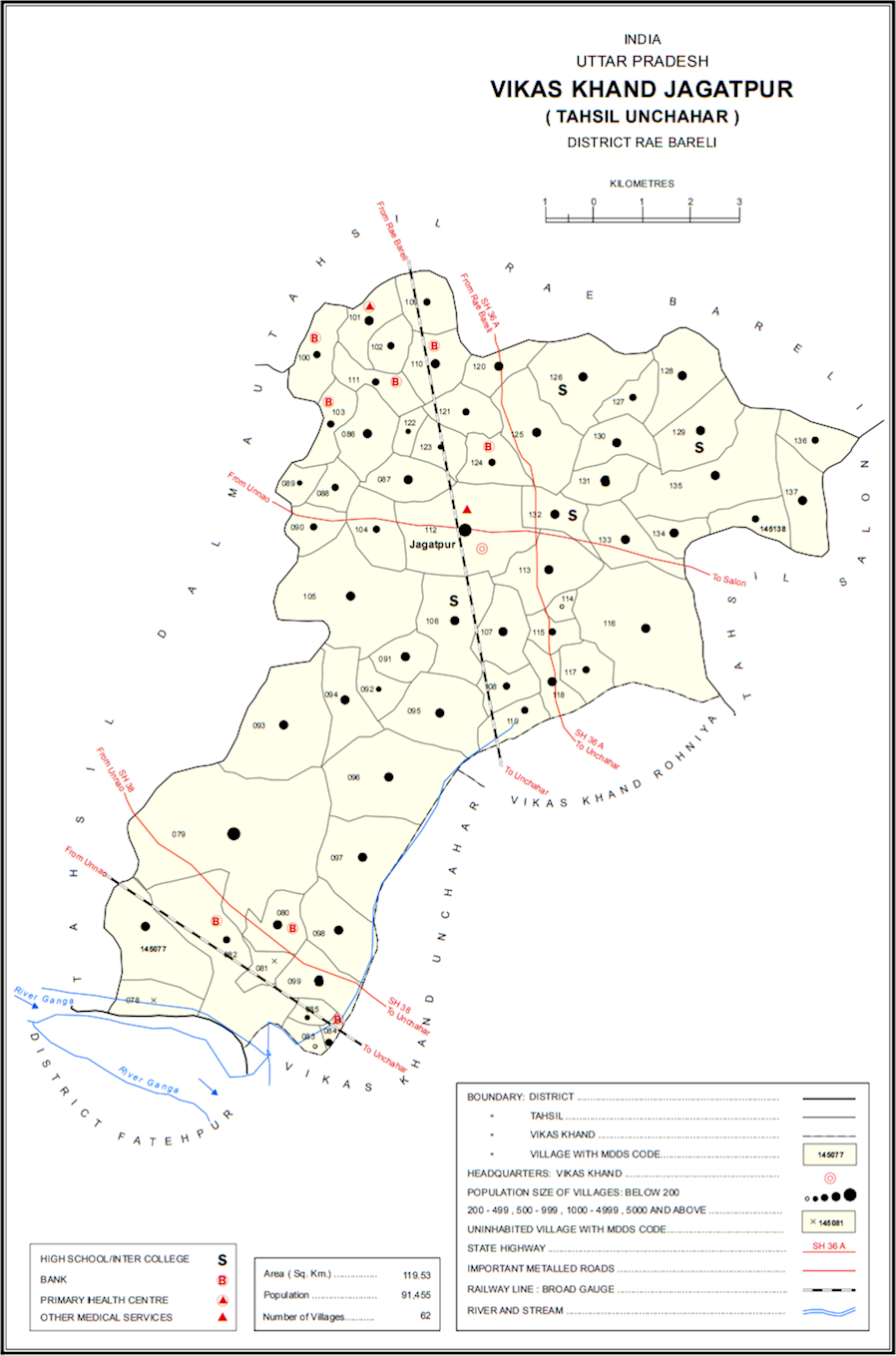
- Map showing Sikandarpur (#092) in Jagatpur CD block

- Location in Uttar Pradesh, India
- Coordinates: 26.023631°N 81.242732°E
- Country India: India
- State: Uttar Pradesh
- District: Raebareli

Area
  - Total: 0.602 km^{2} (0.232 sq mi)

Population (2011)
  - Total: 494
  - Density: 821/km^{2} (2,130/sq mi)

Languages
  - Official: Hindi
- Time zone: UTC+5:30 (IST)
- Vehicle registration: UP-35

Sikandarpur is a village in Jagatpur block of Rae Bareli district, Uttar Pradesh, India. As of 2011, it has a population of 494 people, in 86 households. It has no schools and no healthcare facilities.

The 1961 census recorded Sikandarpur as comprising one hamlet, with a population of 135 people (67 male and 68 female), in 32 households. The area of the village was given as 153 acres.

The 1981 census recorded Sikandarpur as having a population of 211 people, in 41 households, and having an area of 61.11 ha (151.0 acres). The main staple foods were listed as wheat and rice.

Rai Sikander, a gautam rajput who came from the province of Oudh during the imperial rule of Mohmmad Ibrahim, defeated bhars, subduing them, founded this village and named it Sikandarpur.
