= Chichauli =

- Village
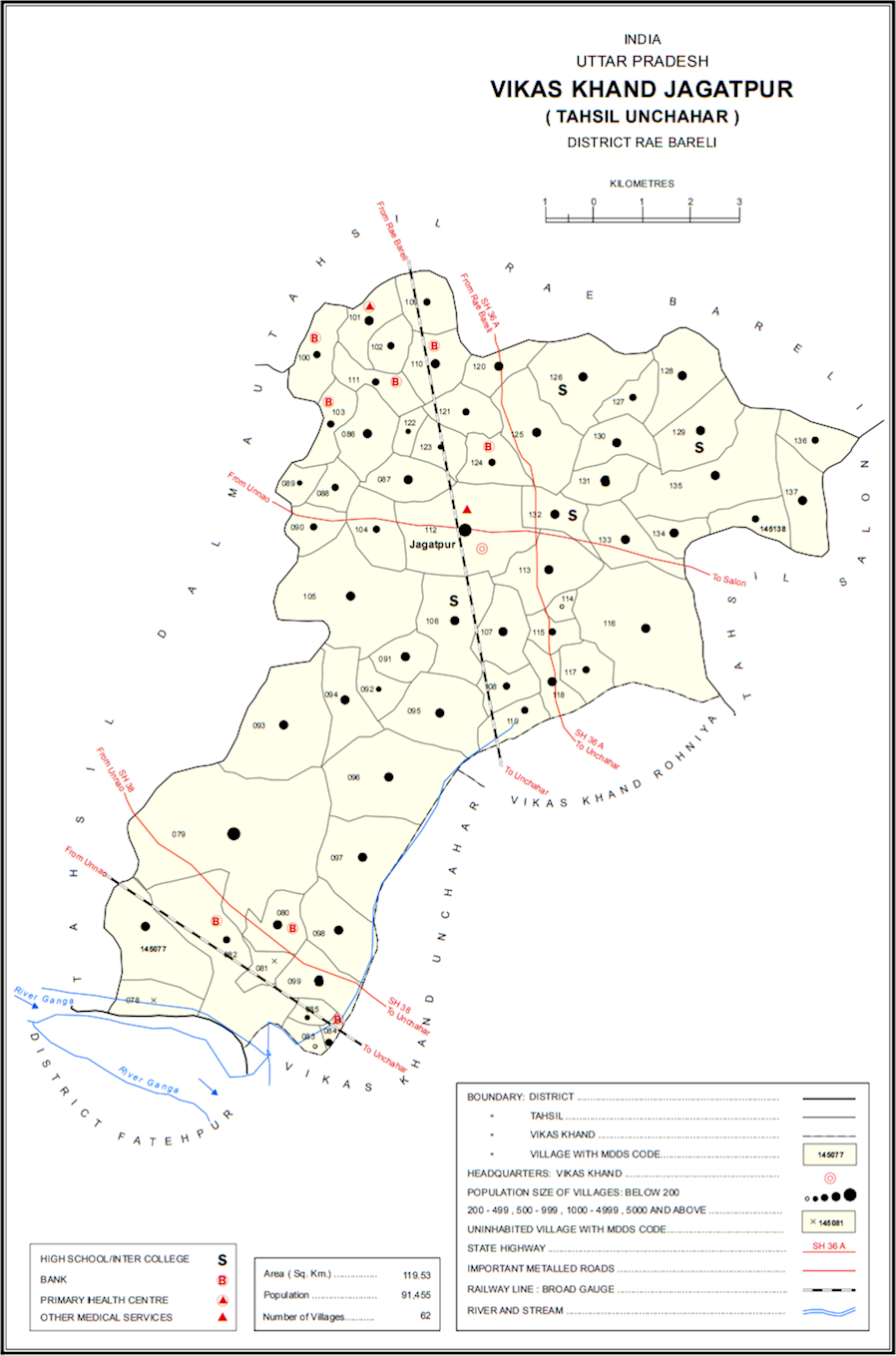
- Map showing Chichauli (#105) in Jagatpur CD block

- Location in Uttar Pradesh, India
- Coordinates: 26.046704°N 81.240061°E
- Country India: India
- State: Uttar Pradesh
- District: Raebareli

Area
  - Total: 5.704 km^{2} (2.202 sq mi)

Population (2011)
  - Total: 4,189
  - Density: 734.4/km^{2} (1,902/sq mi)

Languages
  - Official: Hindi
- Time zone: UTC+5:30 (IST)
- Vehicle registration: UP-35

Chichauli is a village in Jagatpur block of Rae Bareli district, Uttar Pradesh, India. As of 2011, it has a population of 4,189 people, in 711 households. It has 3 primary schools and no healthcare facilities.

The 1961 census recorded Chichauli as comprising 16 hamlets, with a total population of 1,864 people (953 male and 911 female), in 369 households and 345 physical houses. The area of the village was given as 1,439 acres.

The 1981 census recorded Chichauli as having a population of 2,308 people, in 475 households, and having an area of 582.34 hectares. The main staple foods were listed as wheat and rice.
