= Khajuri, Raebareli =

Khajuri
- Village
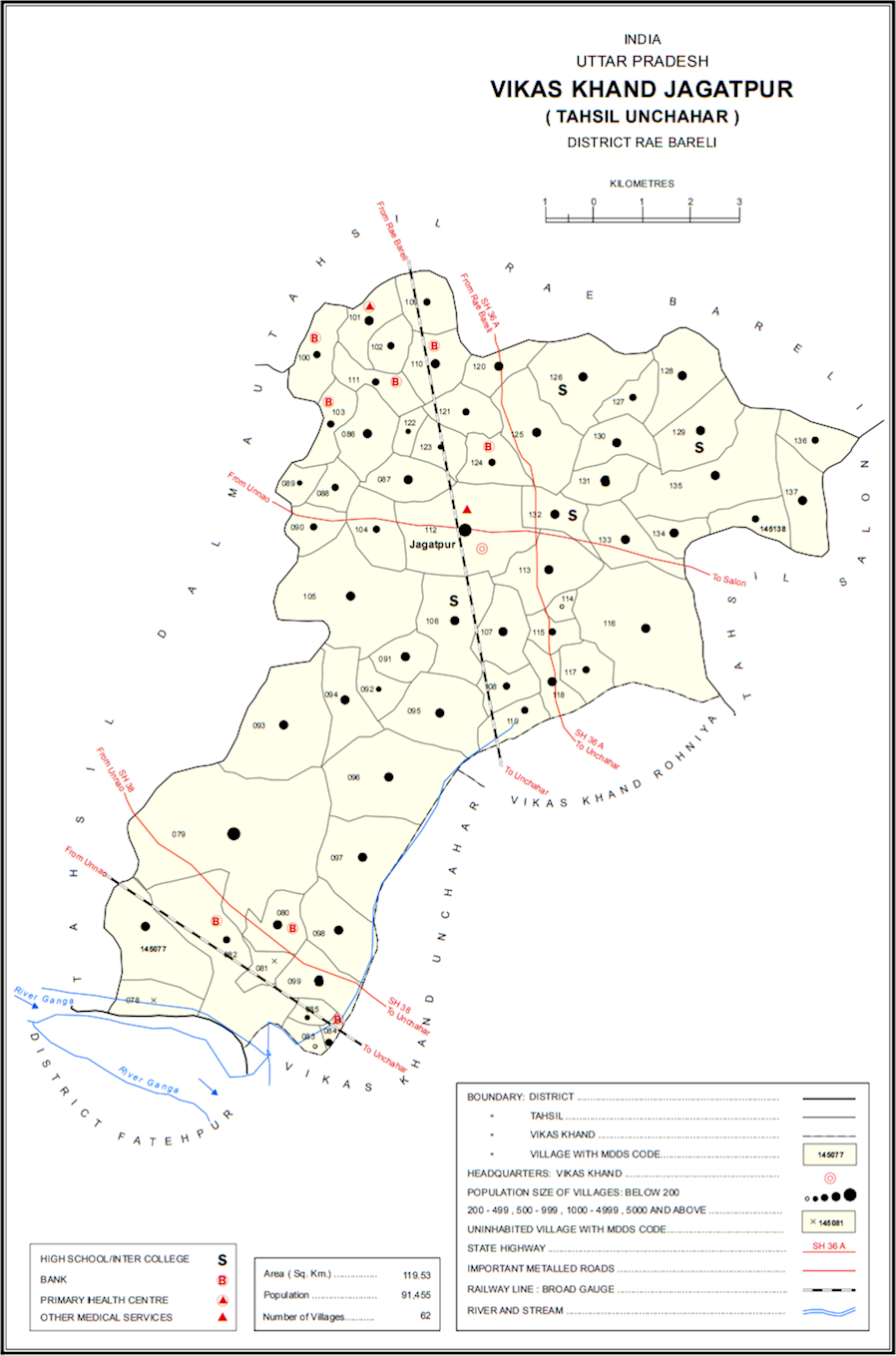
- Map showing Khajuri (#093) in Jagatpur CD block

- Location in Uttar Pradesh, India
- Coordinates: 26.017643°N 81.216723°E
- Country India: India
- State: Uttar Pradesh
- District: Raebareli

Area
  - Total: 4.09 km^{2} (1.58 sq mi)

Population (2011)
  - Total: 2,062
  - Density: 504/km^{2} (1,310/sq mi)

Languages
  - Official: Hindi
- Time zone: UTC+5:30 (IST)
- Vehicle registration: UP-35

Khajuri is a village in Jagatpur block of Rae Bareli district, Uttar Pradesh, India. As of 2011, it has a population of 2,062 people, in 364 households.

The 1961 census recorded Khajuri as comprising 6 hamlets, with a total population of 902 people (450 male and 452 female), in 178 households and 165 physical houses. The area of the village was given as 1,047 acres.

The 1981 census recorded Khajuri as having a population of 1,260 people, in 207 households, and having an area of 423.71 hectares. The main staple foods were listed as wheat and rice.
