= Khajuri Khurd =

- village
- Location in Uttar Pradesh, India Khajuri Khurd (India)
- Coordinates: 24°56′29″N 082°02′48″E
- Country: India
- State: Uttar Pradesh
- District: Allahabad
- Tehsil: Koraon

Government
  - Body: Gram panchayat

Population (2001)
  - Total: 2,012

Languages
- Time zone: UTC+5:30 (IST)

Khajuri Khurd is a panchayat village in Koraon Tehsil in Allahabad District, Uttar Pradesh, India. It is approximately 1.5 km (by road) south of the village of Khajuri Kalan, and about 2 km (by road) northeast of the village of Kukurhata. Administratively, it is a gram panchayat under Koraon Tehsil. There are six villages in the Khajuri Khurd gram panchayat: Khajuri Khurd, Chak Dadar, Khajuri Kalan, Koilariha, Pachauha, and Patka Bodaha.

In the 2001 census, the village of Khajuri Khurd had a population of 2,012, with 1,036 males and 976 females.
