= Khajoori Sadak =

- village
- Location within Madhya Pradesh Location within India
- Coordinates: 23.2409778°N 77.2419522°E
- Country: India
- State: Madhya Pradesh
- District: Bhopal
- Tehsil: Huzur
- Elevation: 519 m (1,703 ft)

Population (2011)
  - Total: 2,509
- Time zone: UTC+5:30 (IST)
- PIN: 462030
- ISO 3166 code: MP-IN
- 2011 census code: 482480

Khajoori Sadak is a village in the Bhopal district of Madhya Pradesh, India. It is located in the Huzur tehsil and the Phanda block.

== Demographics ==
According to the 2011 census of India, Khajoori Sadak has 491 households. The effective literacy rate (i.e. the literacy rate of population excluding children aged 6 and below) is 72.31%.

Demographics (2011 Census)
	Total	Male	Female
Population	2509	1337	1172
Children aged below 6 years	335	187	148
Scheduled caste	541	285	256
Scheduled tribe	43	20	23
Literates	1572	952	620
Workers (all)	1021	681	340
Main workers (total)	737	607	130
Main workers: Cultivators	218	189	29
Main workers: Agricultural labourers	243	164	79
Main workers: Household industry workers	13	10	3
Main workers: Other	263	244	19
Marginal workers (total)	284	74	210
Marginal workers: Cultivators	131	18	113
Marginal workers: Agricultural labourers	102	26	76
Marginal workers: Household industry workers	4	3	1
Marginal workers: Others	47	27	20
Non-workers	1488	656	832
