= Khajuriya Kalan =

- Village
- Location within Madhya Pradesh Location within India
- Coordinates: 23.774994°N 77.267940°E
- Country: India
- State: Madhya Pradesh
- District: Bhopal
- Tehsil: Berasia

Population (2011)
  - Total: 673
- Time zone: UTC+5:30 (IST)
- ISO 3166 code: MP-IN
- Census code: 482066

Khajuriya Kalan is a village in the Bhopal district of Madhya Pradesh, India. It is located in the Berasia tehsil.

== Demographics ==
According to the 2011 census of India, Khajuriya Kalan has 146 households. The effective literacy rate (i.e. the literacy rate of population excluding children aged 6 and below) is 68.11%.

Demographics (2011 Census)
	Total	Male	Female
Population	673	356	317
Children aged below 6 years	118	57	61
Scheduled caste	116	71	45
Scheduled tribe	6	2	4
Literates	378	265	113
Workers (all)	340	180	160
Main workers (total)	248	144	104
Main workers: Cultivators	173	101	72
Main workers: Agricultural labourers	70	39	31
Main workers: Household industry workers	0	0	0
Main workers: Other	5	4	1
Marginal workers (total)	92	36	56
Marginal workers: Cultivators	5	1	4
Marginal workers: Agricultural labourers	86	35	51
Marginal workers: Household industry workers	0	0	0
Marginal workers: Others	1	0	1
Non-workers	333	176	157
