= Khajuri, Yamunanagar =

Khajuri
- Village
- Location in Haryana, India Khajuri (India)
- Coordinates: 30.1°N 77.28°E
- Country: India
- State: Haryana
- District: Yamunanagar
- Sarpanch: Randeep Singh

Population
  - Total: Around 1,500

Languages
  - Official: Hindi
- Time zone: UTC+5:30 (IST)
- PIN: 135001
- Telephone code: 911732
- ISO 3166 code: IN-HR
- Vehicle registration: HR 02
- Nearest city: Yamuna Nagar
- Lok Sabha constituency: Kurukshetra
- Vidhan Sabha constituency: Radaur
- Website: haryana.gov.in

Khajuri is a village in the district Yamunanagar, in the state of Haryana, India.The name of sarpanch is Rana Randeep Singh. It is situated on the khajuri road(Yamunanagar to Karnal via Gumthala). This is the village of Rajput's. This village is known for its development.

== Education ==
- Government Middle School, Khajuri
- Shri Krishna Public School, Khajuri
