= Khajuri Kalan =

- village
- Location in Uttar Pradesh, India Khajuri Kalan (India)
- Coordinates: 24°57′14″N 082°03′03″E
- Country: India
- State: Uttar Pradesh
- District: Prayagraj
- Tehsil: Koraon

Government
  - Body: Gram panchayat

Population (2001)
  - Total: 973

Languages
- Time zone: UTC+5:30 (IST)

Khajuri Kalan is a village in Koraon Tehsil in Prayagraj district, Uttar Pradesh, India. It is about 1.5 km by road south of the village of Pathertal, and about 1.5 km by road north of the village of Khajuri Khurd. Administratively, it is under the gram panchayat of Khajuri Khurd.

In the 2001 census, the village of Khajuri Kalan had a population of 973, with 498 males and 475 females.
