= Khajuri, Kalaburagi =

Khajuri
- village
- Country: India
- State: Karnataka
- District: Gulbarga
- Talukas: Aland

Population (2001)
  - Total: 6,273

Languages
  - Official: Kannada
- Time zone: UTC+5:30 (IST)

Khajuri is a village in the southern state of Karnataka, India. It is located in the Aland taluk of Kalaburagi district in Karnataka.

== Demographics ==
As of 2001 India census, Khajuri had a population of 6273 with 3162 males and 3111 females.

== See also ==
- Gulbarga
- Districts of Karnataka
