= Rani Khajuri =

Rani Khajuri Khajuri Rani
- village
- Location within Madhya Pradesh Location within India
- Coordinates: 23.733622°N 77.583036°E
- Country: India
- State: Madhya Pradesh
- District: Bhopal
- Tehsil: Berasia

Population (2011)
  - Total: 737
- Time zone: UTC+5:30 (IST)
- ISO 3166 code: IN-MP
- Census code: 482170

Rani Khajuri is a village in the Bhopal district of Madhya Pradesh, India. It is located in the Berasia tehsil.

== Demographics ==
According to the 2011 census of India, Rani Khajuri has 176 households. The effective literacy rate (i.e. the literacy rate of population excluding children aged 6 and below) is 78.89%.

Demographics (2011 Census)
	Total	Male	Female
Population	737	384	353
Children aged below 6 years	126	59	67
Scheduled caste	97	51	46
Scheduled tribe	0	0	0
Literates	482	291	191
Workers (all)	235	206	29
Main workers (total)	233	204	29
Main workers: Cultivators	85	81	4
Main workers: Agricultural labourers	138	116	22
Main workers: Household industry workers	0	0	0
Main workers: Other	10	7	3
Marginal workers (total)	2	2	0
Marginal workers: Cultivators	0	0	0
Marginal workers: Agricultural labourers	2	2	0
Marginal workers: Household industry workers	0	0	0
Marginal workers: Others	0	0	0
Non-workers	502	178	324
