= Khajuri (food) =

Nepalese snack

Khajuri is a traditional Nepali fried sweet snack, also found in some North Indian and broader South Asian culinary contexts. It is typically made from flour and sugar and is traditionally deep-fried in ghee, though oil may also be used as an alternative. Khajuri is commonly associated with festivals or special occasions in Nepal and is particularly prepared during Chhath Parva and Tihar as a ritual offering or for celebrating events such as weddings. During festivals, family gatherings, and community celebrations, Khajuri is often prepared or purchased as part of offerings to deities, guests, and neighbors. One blog describes Khajuri as a "favorite tea-time sweet snack" in Kathmandu, indicating that it is also a part of everyday consumption and not limited solely to festive occasions.

== Regional and community associations ==
Khajuri is especially popular in the southern Terai region of Nepal, where it forms part of mithai, the category of traditional Nepali sweets. It is widely sold and consumed in the Terai and is also commonly available in sweet shops throughout the Kathmandu Valley and other regions. The sweet traditions of the Terai reflect strong influences from neighboring Indian culinary practices, and due to this overlap, deep-fried sweets such as Khajuri are more prevalent in the plains than in Nepal’s hill or mountain regions.

== Production ==
Khajuri is typically prepared using flour, semolina, sugar, ghee, salt and milk, which are combined to form a dough. After resting, the dough is divided into small portions, rolled into rounds or shaped, and then deep-fried in ghee or oil until golden and crisp. In some preparations, the surface of the dough is pressed using a wooden khajuri press to create a vertically lined pattern before frying, while in other cases a wooden mold known as a thasaa is used for shaping.

== Taste and texture ==
Khajuri is generally crispy, flaky and buttery, qualities attributed to deep-frying in ghee, which imparts a rich flavor. It is sweet. though not excessively so, as sweetness is derived from sugar or powdered sugar rather than syrup,, resulting in a mild sweetness that pairs well with tea or coffee. For this reason, Khajuri is often consumed as a light snack or tea-time sweet.
