= Chandauli, Jagatpur, Raebareli =

Chandauli
- Village
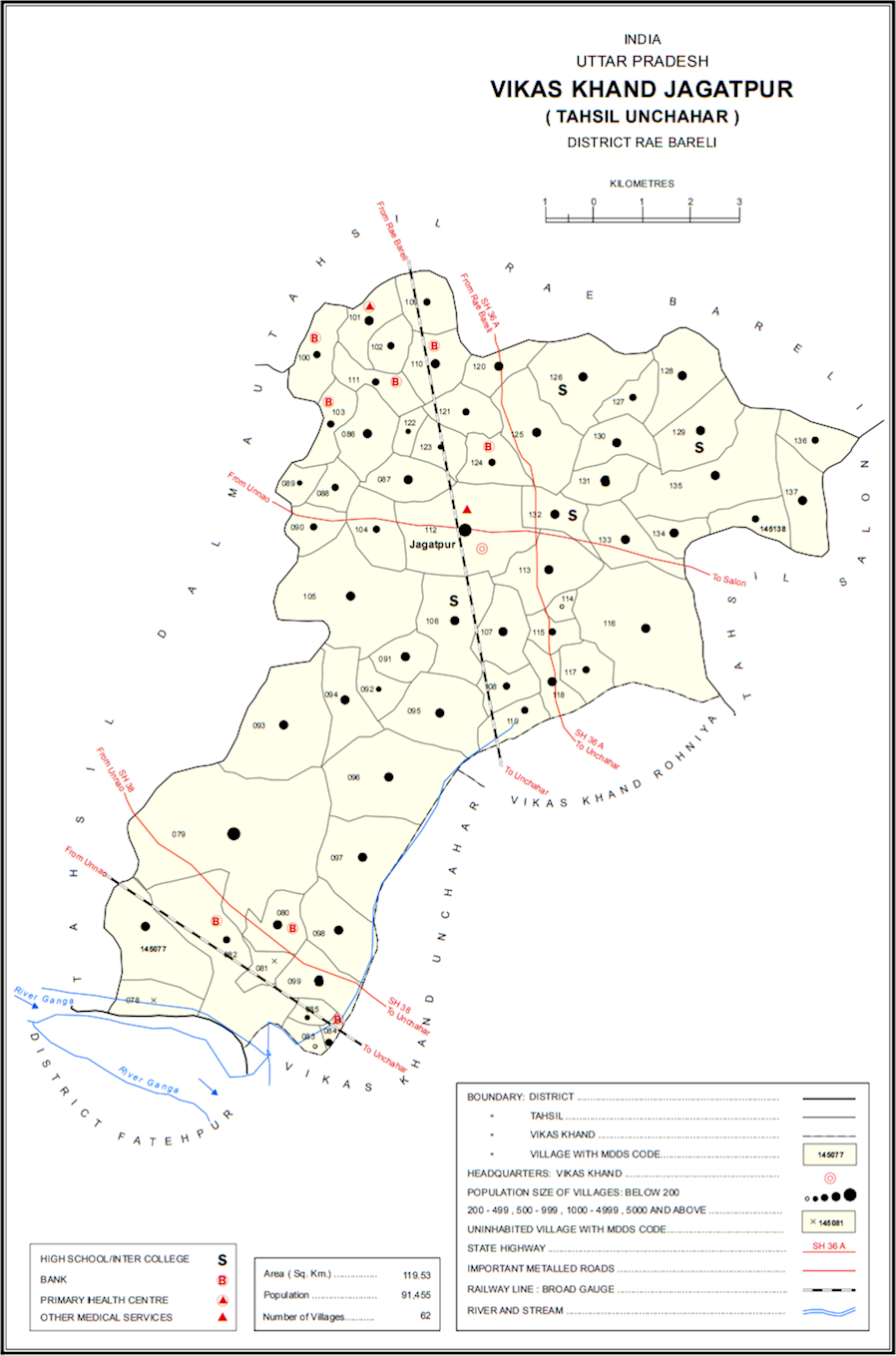
- Map showing Chandauli (#102) in Jagatpur CD block

- Location in Uttar Pradesh, India
- Coordinates: 26.088901°N 81.246523°E
- Country India: India
- State: Uttar Pradesh
- District: Raebareli

Area
  - Total: 0.77 km^{2} (0.30 sq mi)

Population (2011)
  - Total: 516
  - Density: 670/km^{2} (1,700/sq mi)

Languages
  - Official: Hindi
- Time zone: UTC+5:30 (IST)
- Vehicle registration: UP-35

Chandauli is a village in Jagatpur block of Rae Bareli district, Uttar Pradesh, India. As of 2011, it has a population of 516 people, in 98 households. It has no schools and no healthcare facilities.

The 1961 census recorded Chandauli as comprising 2 hamlets, with a total population of 197 people (103 male and 94 female), in 59 households and 51 physical houses. The area of the village was given as 191 acres.

The 1981 census recorded Chandauli as having a population of 324 people, in 67 households, and having an area of 76.48 hectares. The main staple foods were listed as wheat and rice.
