= Khajuri, Bhopal =

Khajuri
- village
- Location within Madhya Pradesh Location within India
- Coordinates: 23.37609862°N 77.37544298°E
- Country: India
- State: Madhya Pradesh
- District: Bhopal
- Tehsil: Huzur
- Elevation: 547 m (1,795 ft)

Population (2011)
  - Total: 894
- Time zone: UTC+5:30 (IST)
- ISO 3166 code: MP-IN
- 2011 census code: 482384

Khajuri is a village in the Bhopal district of Madhya Pradesh, India. It is located in the Huzur tehsil and the Phanda block.

== Demographics ==
According to the 2011 census of India, Khajuri has 173 households. The effective literacy rate (i.e. the literacy rate of population excluding children aged 6 and below) is 77.73%.

Demographics (2011 Census)
	Total	Male	Female
Population	894	483	411
Children aged below 6 years	117	61	56
Scheduled caste	140	76	64
Scheduled tribe	0	0	0
Literates	604	368	236
Workers (all)	398	269	129
Main workers (total)	154	120	34
Main workers: Cultivators	77	63	14
Main workers: Agricultural labourers	31	22	9
Main workers: Household industry workers	4	4	0
Main workers: Other	42	31	11
Marginal workers (total)	244	149	95
Marginal workers: Cultivators	5	4	1
Marginal workers: Agricultural labourers	171	115	56
Marginal workers: Household industry workers	2	0	2
Marginal workers: Others	66	30	36
Non-workers	496	214	282
