= Khajuria Ranku =

- village
- Location within Madhya Pradesh Location within India
- Coordinates: 23.670240°N 77.628164°E
- Country: India
- State: Madhya Pradesh
- District: Bhopal
- Tehsil: Berasia

Population (2011)
  - Total: 495
- Time zone: UTC+5:30 (IST)
- ISO 3166 code: MP-IN
- Census code: 482182

Khajuria Ranku is a village in the Bhopal district of Madhya Pradesh, India. It is located in the Berasia tehsil.

== Demographics ==
According to the 2011 census of India, Khajuria Ranku has 119 households. The effective literacy rate (i.e. the literacy rate of population excluding children aged 6 and below) is 79.09%.

Demographics (2011 Census)
	Total	Male	Female
Population	495	257	238
Children aged below 6 years	55	27	28
Scheduled caste	167	88	79
Scheduled tribe	0	0	0
Literates	348	209	139
Workers (all)	281	159	122
Main workers (total)	65	57	8
Main workers: Cultivators	47	45	2
Main workers: Agricultural labourers	12	9	3
Main workers: Household industry workers	0	0	0
Main workers: Other	6	3	3
Marginal workers (total)	216	102	114
Marginal workers: Cultivators	93	37	56
Marginal workers: Agricultural labourers	123	65	58
Marginal workers: Household industry workers	0	0	0
Marginal workers: Others	0	0	0
Non-workers	214	98	116
