= Khajuria Ramdas =

- village
- Location within Madhya Pradesh Location within India
- Coordinates: 23.6076473°N 77.4156889°E
- Country: India
- State: Madhya Pradesh
- District: Bhopal
- Tehsil: Berasia
- Elevation: 482 m (1,581 ft)

Population (2011)
  - Total: 1,119
- Time zone: UTC+5:30 (IST)
- ISO 3166 code: MP-IN
- 2011 census code: 482253

Khajuria Ramdas is a village in the Bhopal district of Madhya Pradesh, India. It is located in the Berasia tehsil.

== Demographics ==
According to the 2011 census of India, Khajuria Ramdas has 231 households. The effective literacy rate (i.e. the literacy rate of population excluding children aged 6 and below) is 78.44%.

Demographics (2011 Census)
	Total	Male	Female
Population	1119	587	532
Children aged below 6 years	168	90	78
Scheduled caste	573	309	264
Scheduled tribe	0	0	0
Literates	746	440	306
Workers (all)	407	291	116
Main workers (total)	270	240	30
Main workers: Cultivators	90	85	5
Main workers: Agricultural labourers	138	118	20
Main workers: Household industry workers	3	3	0
Main workers: Other	39	34	5
Marginal workers (total)	137	51	86
Marginal workers: Cultivators	24	7	17
Marginal workers: Agricultural labourers	95	33	62
Marginal workers: Household industry workers	3	1	2
Marginal workers: Others	15	10	5
Non-workers	712	296	416
