= Jagatpur, Raebareli =

Jagatpur
- Village
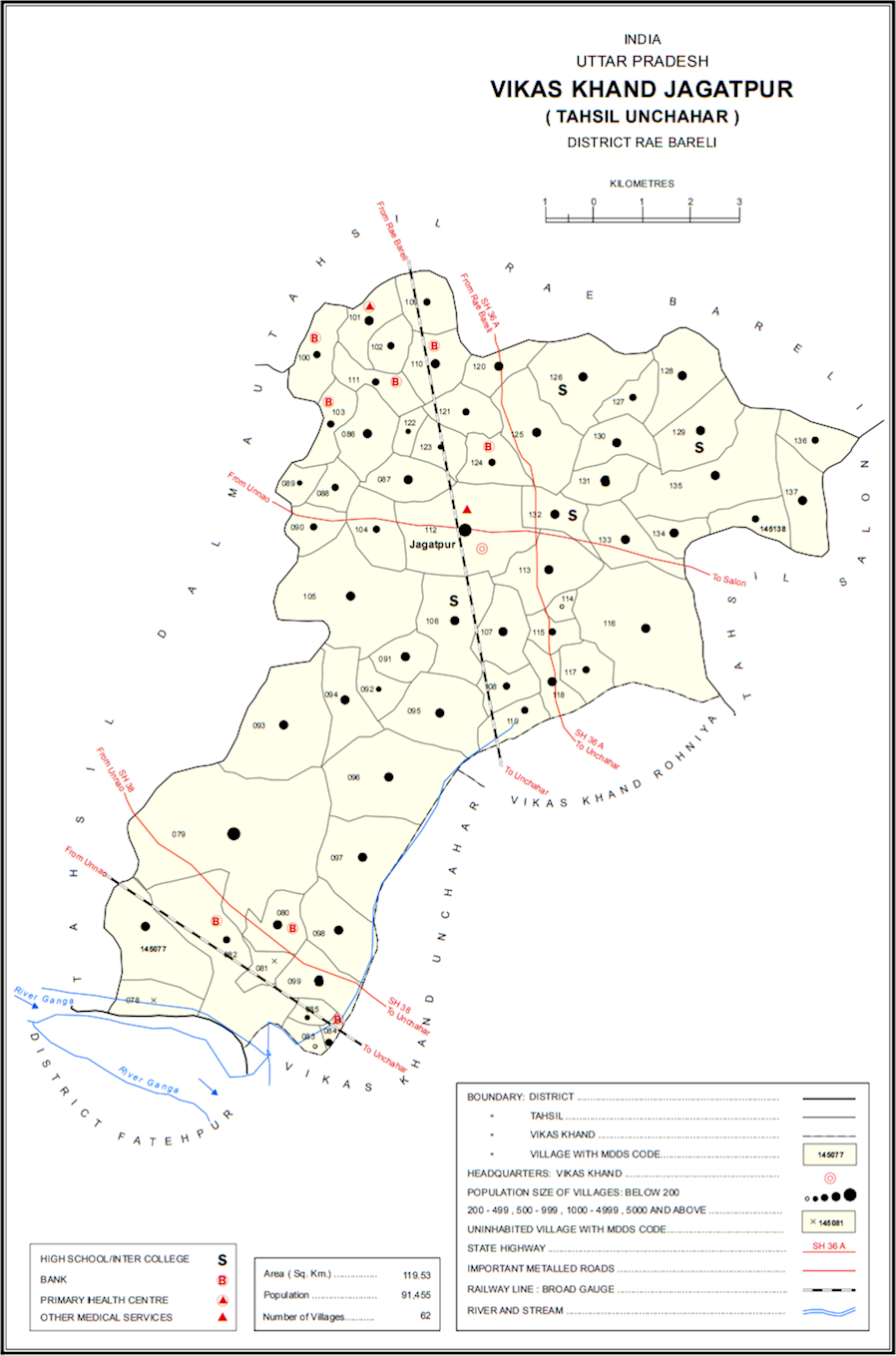
- Map of Jagatpur CD block

- Location in Uttar Pradesh, India
- Coordinates: 26.052917°N 81.272683°E
- Country India: India
- State: Uttar Pradesh
- District: Raebareli

Area
  - Total: 5.49 km^{2} (2.12 sq mi)

Population (2011)
  - Total: 7,267
  - Density: 1,320/km^{2} (3,430/sq mi)

Languages
  - Official: Hindi
- Time zone: UTC+5:30 (IST)
- Vehicle registration: UP-35

Jagatpur is a village and corresponding community development block in Unchahar tehsil of Rae Bareli district, Uttar Pradesh, India. It is located 18 km from Raebareli, the district headquarters, on the road to Allahabad at the point where it intersects the road from Dalmau to Salon. There is a large Buddhist-era ruin site at Tanghan to the south. As of 2011, Jagatpur has a population of 7,267 people, in 1,336 households. It has 4 primary schools and 1 healthcare centre.

== History ==
During the 19th century, Jagatpur formed part of the taluqdari estate of Rana Beni Madho Bakhsh, who had a major fort at the village of Shankarpur a short distance to the northeast. At the turn of the 20th century, Jagatpur was held by Babu Bhubhanaranjan Mukarji, who was taluqdar of Shankarpur at the time. His predecessor, Raja Dakhinaranjan Mukarji, had founded a dispensary in the village, and Bhubhanaranjan continued to maintain it. The village's population in 1901 was 1,537 people, including a large number of Ahirs. Besides the dispensary, it also had a police station, a post office, a cattle pound, and a large primary school.

The 1961 census recorded Jagatpur as comprising 22 hamlets, with a total population of 2,413 people (1,251 male and 1,162 female), in 528 households and 520 physical houses. The area of the village was given as 1,335 acres and it had a post office at that point. It also had the following small industrial establishments: 5 grain mills, 2 miscellaneous food processing facilities, 5 clothing manufacturers, 2 shoemakers, 1 shoe repairer, and 8 bicycle repair shops. There was a dispensary run by a local body. The village's police staff consisted of 1 sub-inspector, 1 head constable, and 14 constables.

The 1981 census recorded Jagatpur as having a population of 3,487 people, in 741 households, and having an area of 540.26 hectares. The main staple foods were listed as wheat and rice.

== Villages ==
Jagatpur CD block has the following 62 villages:

Village name	Total land area (hectares)	Population (in 2011)
Dhoota Mu.	622.1	4,694
Dhoota Ahat Mali	814.6	0
Sudamapur	983.2	6,986
Kajiyana	199.6	2,978
Pure Saidwara	18.5	0
Mutawallipur Rana Sahab	60.8	910
Said Alipur	28.3	175
Purey Nasiran	43.4	804
Purey Said Raju	55.1	263
Saray Sri Bux	169	1,671
Kewalpur Baretha	124	1,024
Bhanwa Mau	86	524
Mame Mau	61	305
Jalalpur Behi	69	595
Tewaripur	113.3	1,143
Sikandarpur	60.2	494
Khajuri	409	2,062
Chhichhe Mau	162	1,024
Kalyanpur Sarjai	226	2,703
Kusumi	396	2,406
Hathkui	217.3	1,120
Manihar Sharki	189.8	1,433
Makhadumpur Urf Munimabad	92.7	1,089
Gaura Lakhmi	177	929
Hardi Tikar	148	1,570
Chandauli	77	516
Tikatha Musallepur	99	645
Mohanpur Urf Gopiapur	77	567
Chichauli	570.4	4,189
Dhobaha	173.5	1,761
Jigna	147	1,593
Ibrahimpur Jarhaia	128.9	890
Beni Kopa	101	501
Beni Kama	183	1,243
Dharamdaspur	126	828
Jagatpur (block headquarters)	549	7,267
Taghan	201.4	1,846
Gobardhanpur	24.2	130
Bairihat	82.2	884
Ramgarh Tikaria	544.3	3,774
Rojhaia Bhikham Shah	68	711
Rojhaia Gokulpur	114	1,161
Purey Jham Singh	55	672
Nabab Ganj	129	1,271
Sanhoo Kuwan	140.1	753
Jogpatti Keshav	39	217
Jogpatti Damodar	51	468
Jog Magdipur	114.9	812
Bhikh	306	2,546
Hewtaha Newarhia	340.9	1,654
Koria	78.8	847
Jamori	218	1,391
Umari	213	1,388
Siddhaur	132.8	1,203
Shitalpur Urf Shankarpur	141.4	1,167
Manoharganj	98.7	1,760
Purab Gaon	177.5	2,237
Daulatpur	119.8	1,196
Urwa	379.1	3,542
Bhatauli	107	523
Singhpur	186.1	1,449
Bichhiya Wadi	133.4	951
