= Beehama =

- village
- Location in Jammu and Kashmir, India Beehama (India)
- Coordinates: 34°13′48″N 74°46′48″E
- Country: India
- Union territory: Jammu and Kashmir
- District: Srinagar

Government
  - Type: Democracy
  - Body: Government of Jammu and Kashmir
- Elevation: 1,585 m (5,200 ft)

Languages
  - Official: Kashmiri, Urdu, Hindi, Dogri, English
- Time zone: UTC+5:30 (IST)
- Postal Code: 191201
- Vehicle registration: JK16

Beehama is a village located in the central area of district Ganderbal, Jammu and Kashmir. It is situated 18 km (11 mi) from Srinagar. The route of Beehama leads towards Kheer Bhawani, Manasbal, Sonamarg, Gadsar, Harmukh Mountain and Gangbal.
