= Gogjigund =

- Panchayat Halqa
- Gogjigund
- Location in Jammu and Kashmir, India Gogjigund (India)
- Coordinates: 34.1833°N 74.7183°E
- Country: India
- Union territory: Jammu and Kashmir
- District: Ganderbal
- Settled: Ancient
- Elevation: 1,619 m (5,312 ft)

Languages
  - Official: Kashmiri, Urdu, Hindi, Dogri, English
- Time zone: UTC+5:30 (IST)
- PIN: 191131
- Distance from Delhi: 835 kilometres (519 mi)

Gogjigund is a village and a Panchayat Halqa in Sherpathri Block of Ganderbal district in the union territory of Jammu and Kashmir, India. Most of the area in this village is under woods.

== Geography ==
Gogjigund is located at 34.1833°N 74.7183°E, 7 km towards west from district headquarters in Ganderbal, 20 km from Union territory capital Srinagar. River Sind flows through the nearby forests located in the area.

== Demographics ==
The population of Gogjigund is 574. Males constitute 51% of the total population while female constitute 49% of the total population. The total geographical area of village is 42.9 hectares. Agriculture is the mainstay of the population. Urdu is the official language here, people also speak their native language (Kashmiri) as well as English (both of which are also official, as well as Hindi).

== See also ==
- Ganderbal
- Kangan
- Kheer Bhawani Temple
- Sherpathri
- Wakura
- Shallabugh
- Paribal Shallabugh
