= Sherpathri =

Sherpathri Shairpather
- Block (Sub-Tehsil)
- Location in Jammu and Kashmir, India Sherpathri (India)
- Coordinates: 34.1733°N 74.7283°E
- Country: India
- Union territory: Jammu and Kashmir
- District: Ganderbal
- Settled: Ancient
- Elevation: 1,619 m (5,312 ft)

Languages
  - Official: Kashmiri, Urdu, Hindi, Dogri, English
- Time zone: UTC+5:30 (IST)
- PIN: 191131
- Distance from Delhi: 837 kilometres (520 mi)

Sherpathri or Shairpather (شیر پٔتھر) is one of the Blocks in District Ganderbal, Jammu and Kashmir, India. It was formed in 2014 by the J&K Govt and is located 5 km from the main town. It is one of 7 Blocks in the Ganderbal District. Sherpathri Consists of 5 Halqas: Gogjigund, Sehpora, Rabitar, Shallabugh and Hakim Gund. Mr. Rafeeq Ahmad Wani is currently the Naib Tehsildar Sherpathri.

== Geography ==
Sherpathri is located 34.1733°N 74.7283°E 5 km west of Ganderbal town and 22 km from the Srinagar center, at an average elevation of 1,650 metres (5,410 ft). The famous Sonamarg hill station is at a distance of 70 km from here. The Sind River, a major tributary to the Jehlum River flows through Sherpathri. The sand (bajri) of this river has a great value for money for its quality.

== Shallabugh Wetland ==
Sherpathri consists one of Asia's largest Wetland Shallabugh Wetland in the Shallabugh village of the Sherpathri Block. A large number of migratory birds from different countries visit this wetland every year.

== Demographics ==
The population of Block Sherpathri is 51355. Males constitute 52% of its total population while females constitute 48% of the total population. The total geographical area of this Block is 25.42 km^{2}. Agriculture is the mainstay of the population. While Urdu is the official language in the region, people also speak their native language (Kashmiri) as well as English (both of which are also official, as well as Hindi).

== Climate ==
Sherpathri has a humid subtropical climate (Köppen Cfa). The valley is surrounded by the Himalayas on all sides. Winters are cool, with daytime temperature averaging to 2.5 °C (36.5 °F), and drops below freezing point at night. Moderate to heavy snowfall occurs in winter and the highway connecting Kashmir with the rest of India faces frequent blockades due to icy roads and avalanches. Summers are warm with a July daytime average of 24.1 °C (75.4 °F). The average annual rainfall is around 720 millimetres (28 in). Spring is the wettest season while autumn is the driest. The highest temperature reliably recorded is 39.5 °C (103.1 °F) and the lowest is −20.0 °C (−4.0 °F).

== See also ==
- Ganderbal
- Gogjigund
- Sind River
- Wakura
- Shallabugh Wetland
- Paribal Shallabugh
