= Safapora =

Model village in Ganderbal, J&K

Coordinates: 34°15′35″N 74°39′58″E

Main market of Safapora

Safapora, also pronounced as Safapur is a model village in Ganderbal District, Jammu and Kashmir, India in the disputed Kashmir region. It is 13 km (8.1 mi) away from district headquarter Ganderbal and 30 km (19 mi) away from the summer capital Srinagar via Sumbal as well as via Ganderbal. Manasbal Lake, the deepest lake in India, is located in Safapora and is surrounded by two Mughal gardens built by Nur Jahan, Qazi Bagh and Jarokha Bagh (meaning bay window). There is a Wular Manasbal development authority run by state government in Safapora. The area serves as the education hub for the adjoining areas of Chanderger, Hakbara, Asham, Chewa, and Kondabal. In addition, some students from Bandipora District (especially the areas of Ajas and SK Bala) also prefer to receive their education in Safapora. The Safapora area has also good literacy rate. Safapora is also a tourist destination and most tourists visit the Manasbal Lake, the surrounding two parks, Fisheries. Jammu and Kashmir Government College of Engineering and Technology is also located in Safapora.

== Geology ==
Safapora has an average elevation of 1,619 metres (5,312 feet). The Safapora hamlet is blessed with a limestone quarry exposed along the roadside. The limestone outcrop present in the area has a total thickness of more than 100 meters. The quarry blocks, located in the northwest–southeast ridge, being worked out in different beds in dip direction, exposing 50–60 meters of thickness of limestone. The strike of the exposed limestone outcrops are in a northeast–southwest direction. The dip of the limestone outcrop is gentle, at an angle of 20–35 degree due northwest, indicating moderate influence of tectonic activity. Jointed and thinly bedded limestone offers a boon to the quarry workers. The Safapora limestone is of late Triassic age.

== Notable people ==
- Khawaja Abdul Samad Wani, journalist and politician

== Sources ==
- Mohsin Noor et al (2019). Limestone deposits of Saderkote Bandipora Kashmir
