= Paribal Shallabugh =

Village in Jammu & Kashmir, India

Paribal Shallabugh Ganderbal Shallabugh-C
- Village
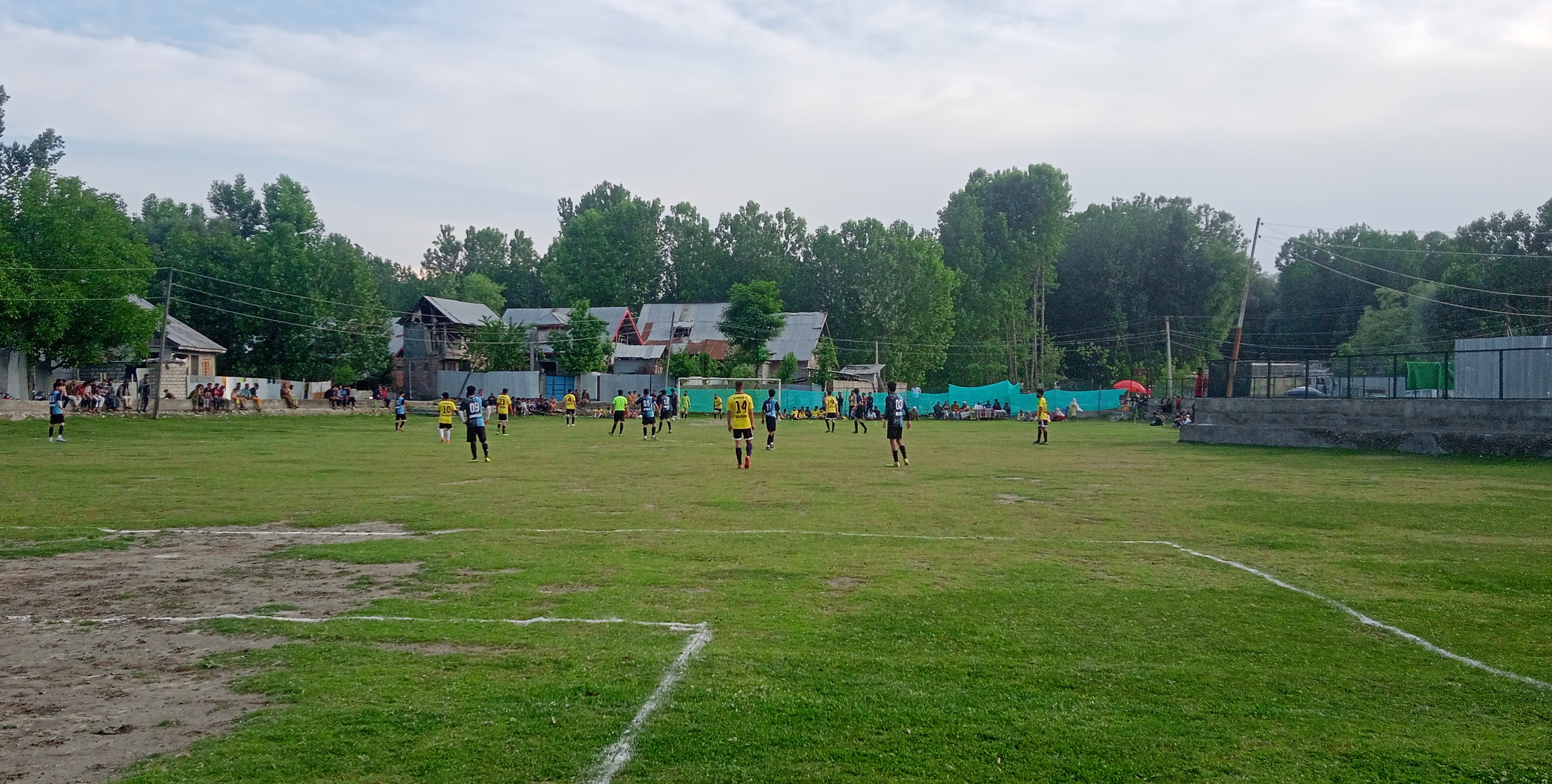
- Paribal Playground

- Location in Jammu & Kashmir, India Paribal Shallabugh Ganderbal (India)
- Coordinates: 34°10′11.79″N 74°43′20.52″E
- Country: India
- Union Territory: Jammu & Kashmir
- Division: Kashmir
- District: Ganderbal
- Tehsil: Tulmulla
- Block: Sherpathri
- Post Office: Tulmulla (191131)
- Demonym(s): Paribaluk, Paribali

Languages
  - Official: Kashmiri
  - Other: Urdu, Hindi, English
- Time zone: UTC+05:30 (IST)
- Pincode: 191131
- Area code: 194
- ISO 3166 code: 0194
- Vehicle registration: JK-16

Paribal or Paribal Shallabugh (Kashmiri: پَرٕ بَل شالہٕ بۆگ) is a small notified village and locality forming part of the tourist village of Shallabugh. It is situated between the villages of Shallabugh, Chundina Deh Nowabad, and Takenwaripora in the Sherpathri block of Tulmulla tehsil, Ganderbal district, in the Kashmir Valley of the Union Territory of Jammu and Kashmir India.

== Etymology ==
The name Paribal generally refers to three localities: Paribal, Pethkundal, and Tull Mohalla. Locals from neighboring villages often collectively refer to all these localities as Paribal. These villages, are also officially documented as Shallabugh-C by government sources, and are the part of Shallabugh-A Panchayat Halqa. The name Paribal traces back to Kashmiri words Par (پَر) meaning chisels and Bal (بل) meaning riverside, forming Par Bal, which later became Paribal. This village was a key center for river trade. Boatmen used chisels to anchor their boats along the Sind River, giving the village its name.

== History ==
Paribal's history dates back to ancient times when it served as a crucial trade route for the people of nearby villages in Sherpathri. Situated on the bank of the Sind River, this route played a vital role in transporting goods during ancient times through the Sind River towards Shadipora town and further areas of Srinagar and Bandipora districts via the Jhelum River.

Despite serving as the hub for trade, Paribal also served as the primary source of drinking water for dozens of villages in the Sherpathri belt of Ganderbal district. During ancient times, when water facilities were nonexistent, communities often relied on natural sources such as rivers, lakes, and wells for their water needs. Locals from nearby villages such as Hathbura, Pirpora, Hakeemgund, Chundina Deh Nowabad, and Gogjigund used to bring drinking water as well as water for other purposes from the Sind River at Paribal.

== Geography ==
The village spans thousands of hectares of forest containing millions of willow trees, stretching across both sides of the river. This forest, known as the Sindh Forest Division (Harran/Shallabugh Range), consists of two ranges: Shallabugh I on one side of the riverbank and Shallabugh II on the other side. These forests play a crucial role in maintaining the ecological balance of the area.

Paribal village enjoys a pleasant climate similar to other areas of Kashmir. The Sind River plays a crucial role in irrigation and other fish-related economic activities.

== Demographics ==
The population of Paribal village totals 2,500. The primary language spoken by the people is Kashmiri, with Urdu, Hindi, and English also being prominent.

== Economy ==
The majority of the people in this area depend on agriculture, cultivating rice paddies in their fields to sustain their livelihoods.

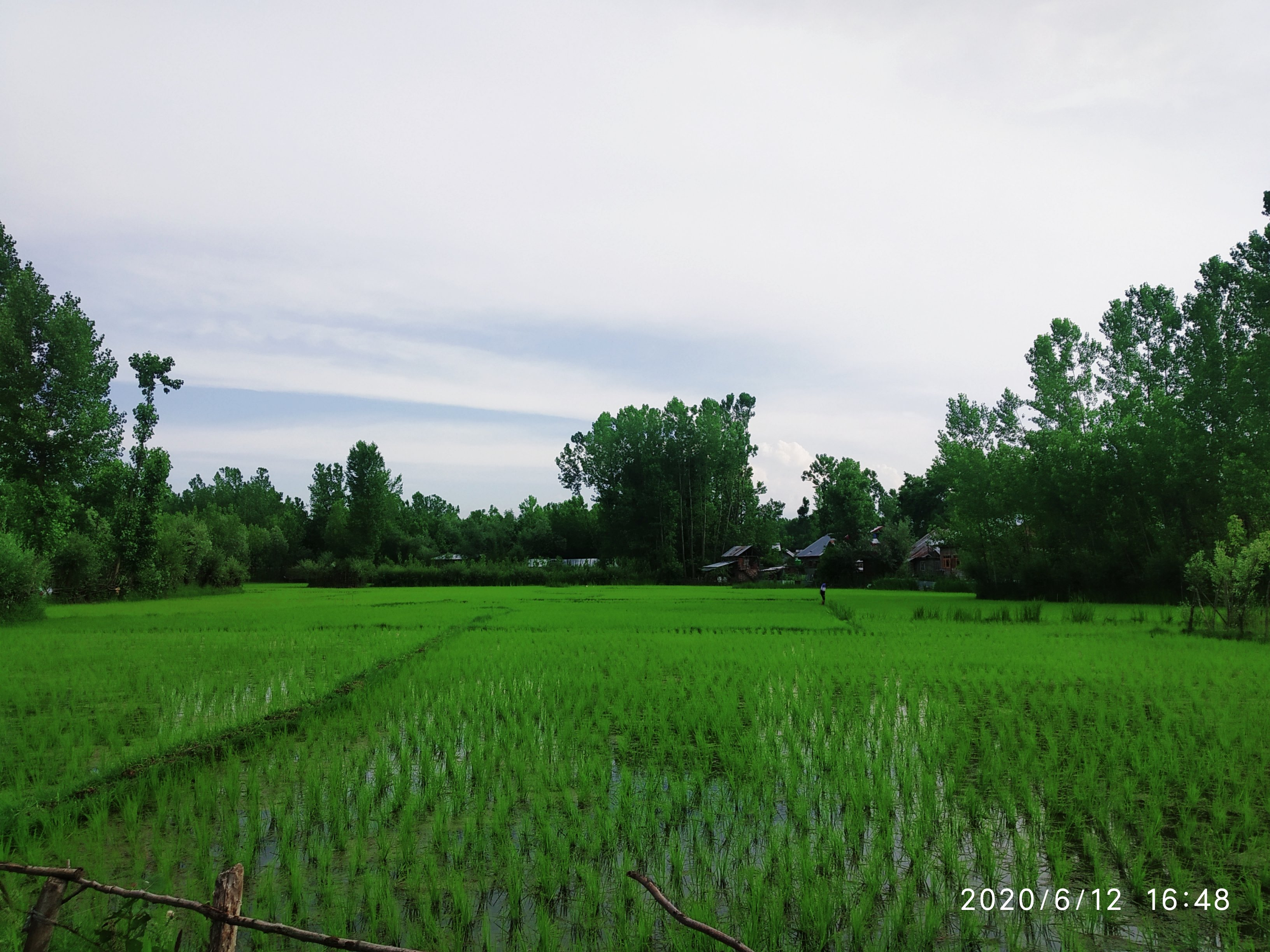
View of Paddy fields during spring season located in Paribal Shallabugh

The Sind River and the Shallabugh Wetland are the primary sources of income for the local economy of the nearby villages. Many people are involved in wickerwork, creating decorative items from locally grown willow stems found on the marshy lands along the banks of the Sind River and Shallabugh Wetland.

== Infrastructure ==
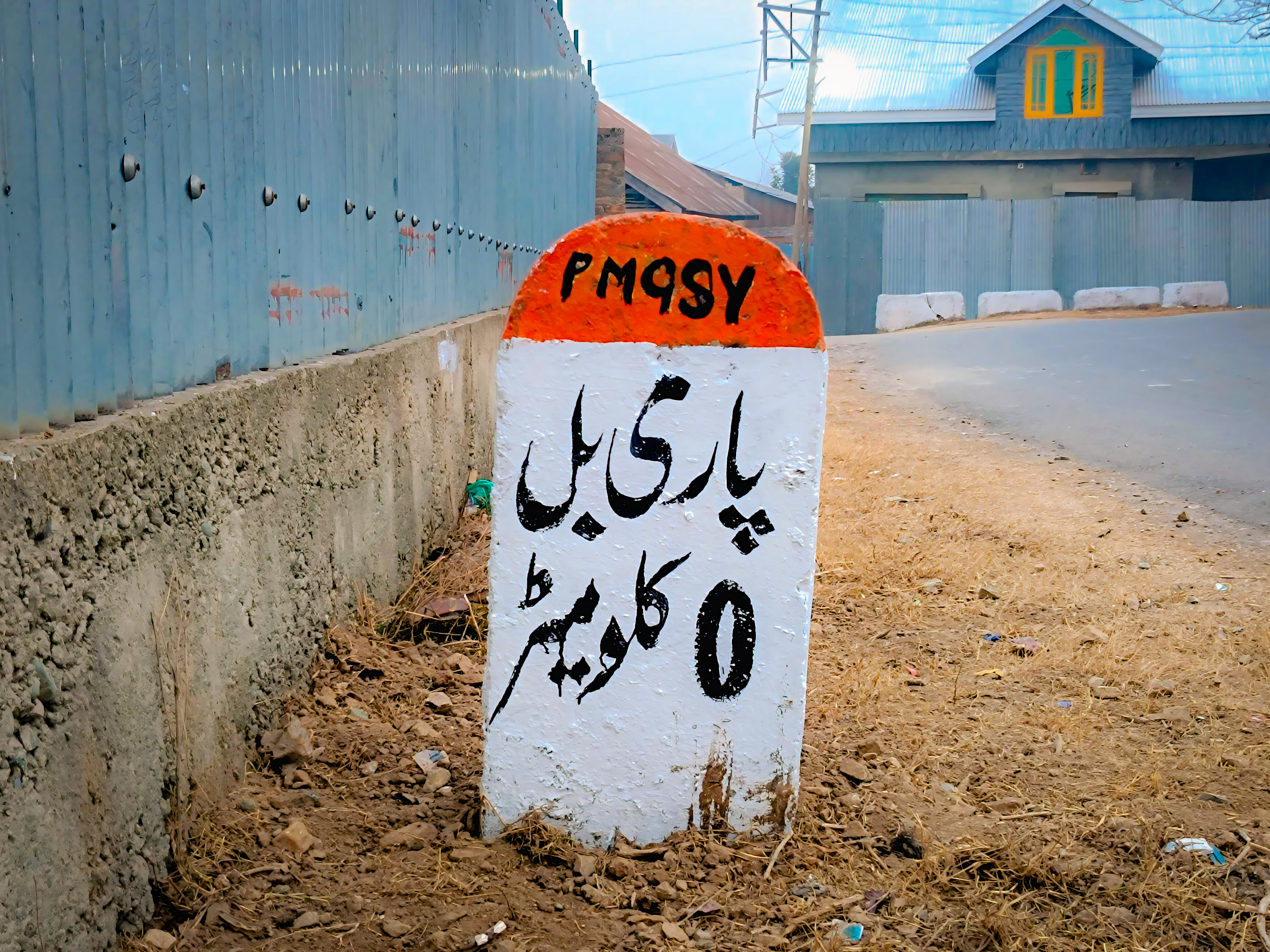
Milestone marker indicating the starting point of Paribal village

Paribal village is well-connected by roads to Ganderbal city, located just 8 km away. However, despite its proximity to Srinagar city it is located just 15 km from the Srinagar, it is not directly connected. The construction of the Paribal-Takanwari Bridge, inaugurated by Chief Minister of Union Territory of Jammu and Kashmir Shri. Omar Abdullah, in November 2024 is underway. This bridge will connect the villages of Sherpathri belt of Ganderbal district with Srinagar district, Baramulla district, and Bandipora district.

== Landmarks and attractions ==
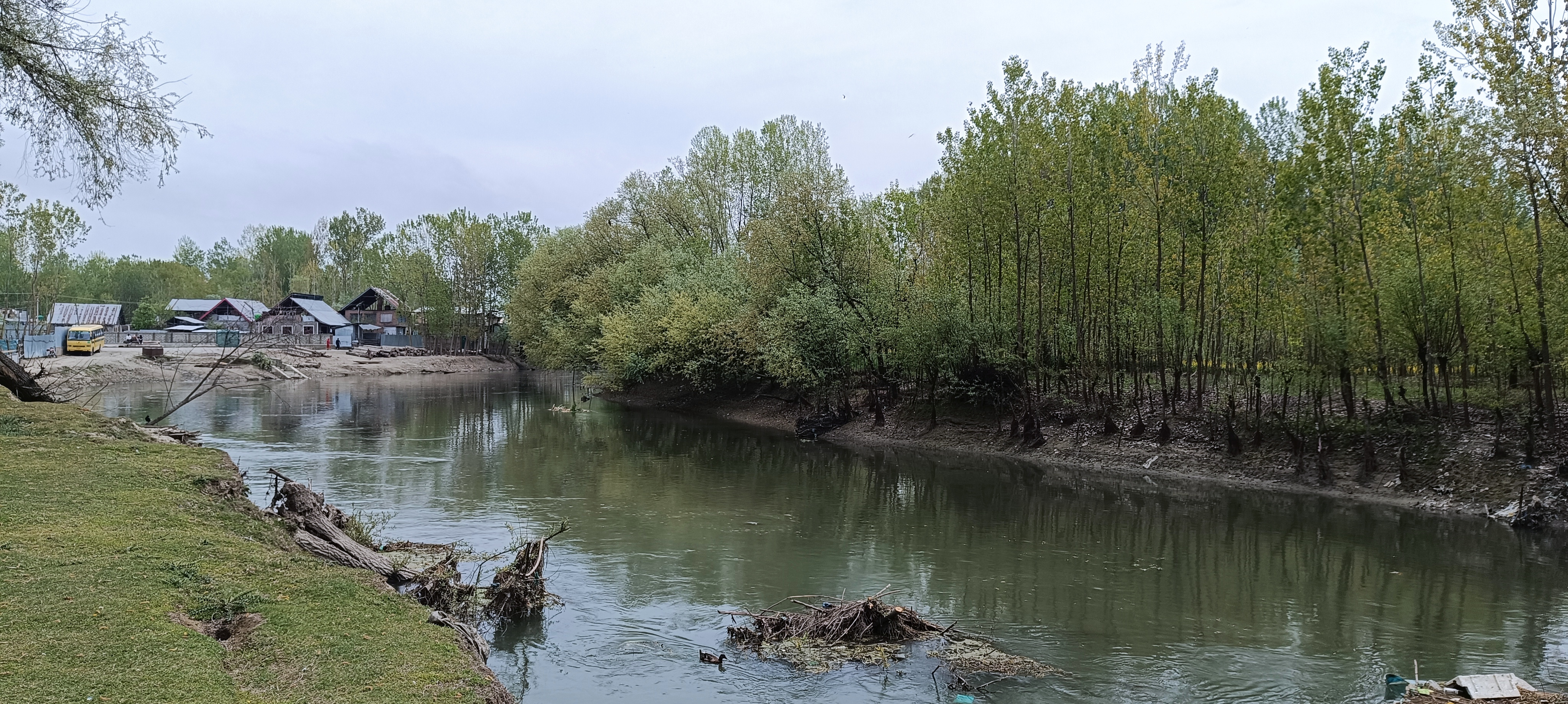
View of Sindh river, flowing through Sindh Forest Division

The Sindh Forest Division Shallabugh I and II, spanning across the Sind River, attract tourists for camping and picnics, as well as fishing enthusiasts. The Ramsar-declared site, Shallabugh Wetland, can also be accessed via a pedestrian route through this village. The Paribal Playground, located on the Sind riverbank, is famous for organizing football tournaments every year, attracting thousands of players and spectators. The Pethkundal Playground, located on the other side of the Sind River, is ideal for playing cricket, enjoyed by the locals.

== Religious places ==
- Jamia Masjid Shareef Paribal
- Masjid Shareef Laway Mohalla
- Masjid Shareef Sultan ul Arifeen (ra) Gulshanabad Ghat

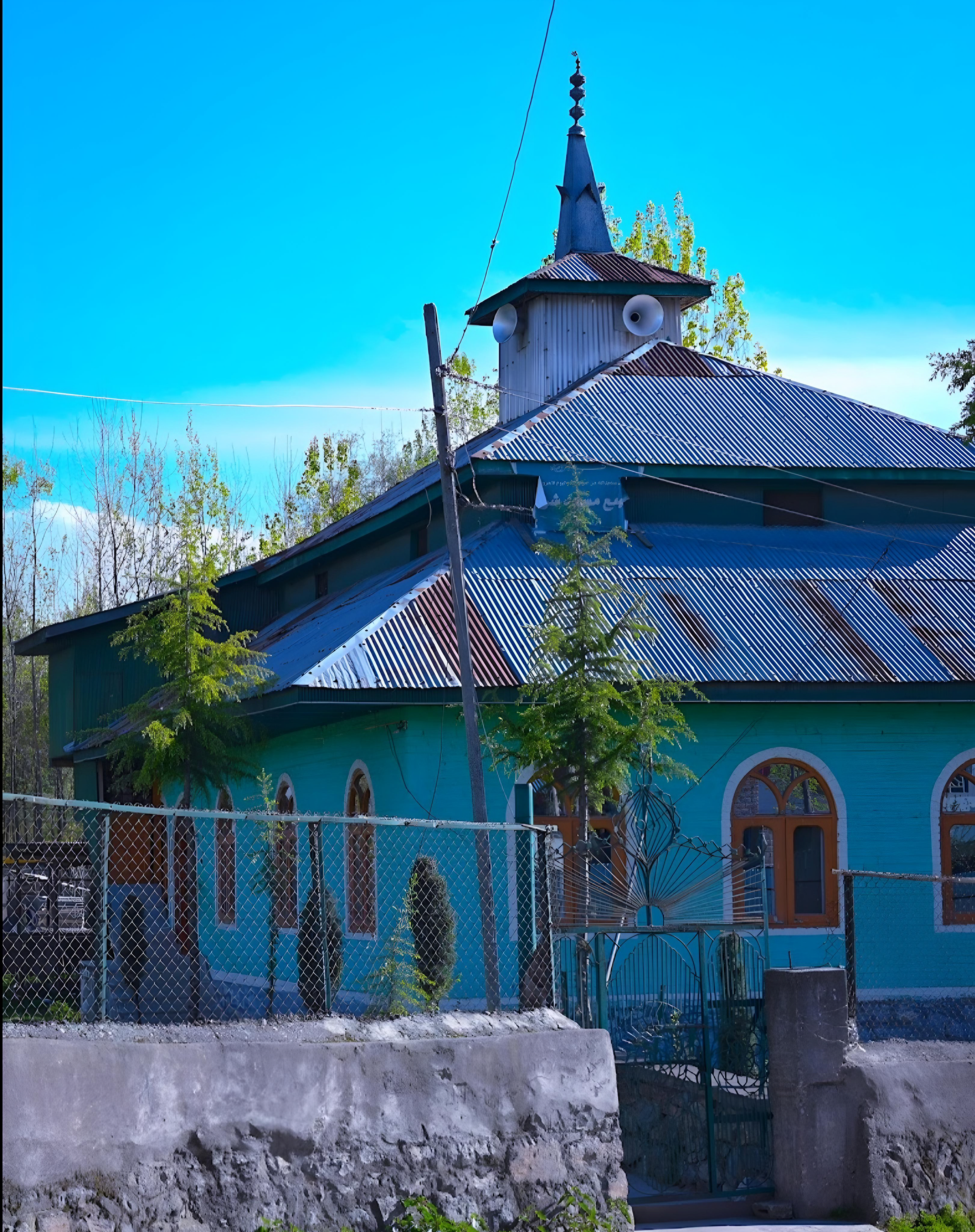
Jamia Masjid Paribal Shareef Shallabugh Ganderbal

== Education institutes ==
- Government Primary School Paribal
- Government Primary School Pethkundal
- Government Primary School Tull Mohalla
