= Shallabugh Wetland =

Wetland conservation area in Jammu and Kashmir, India

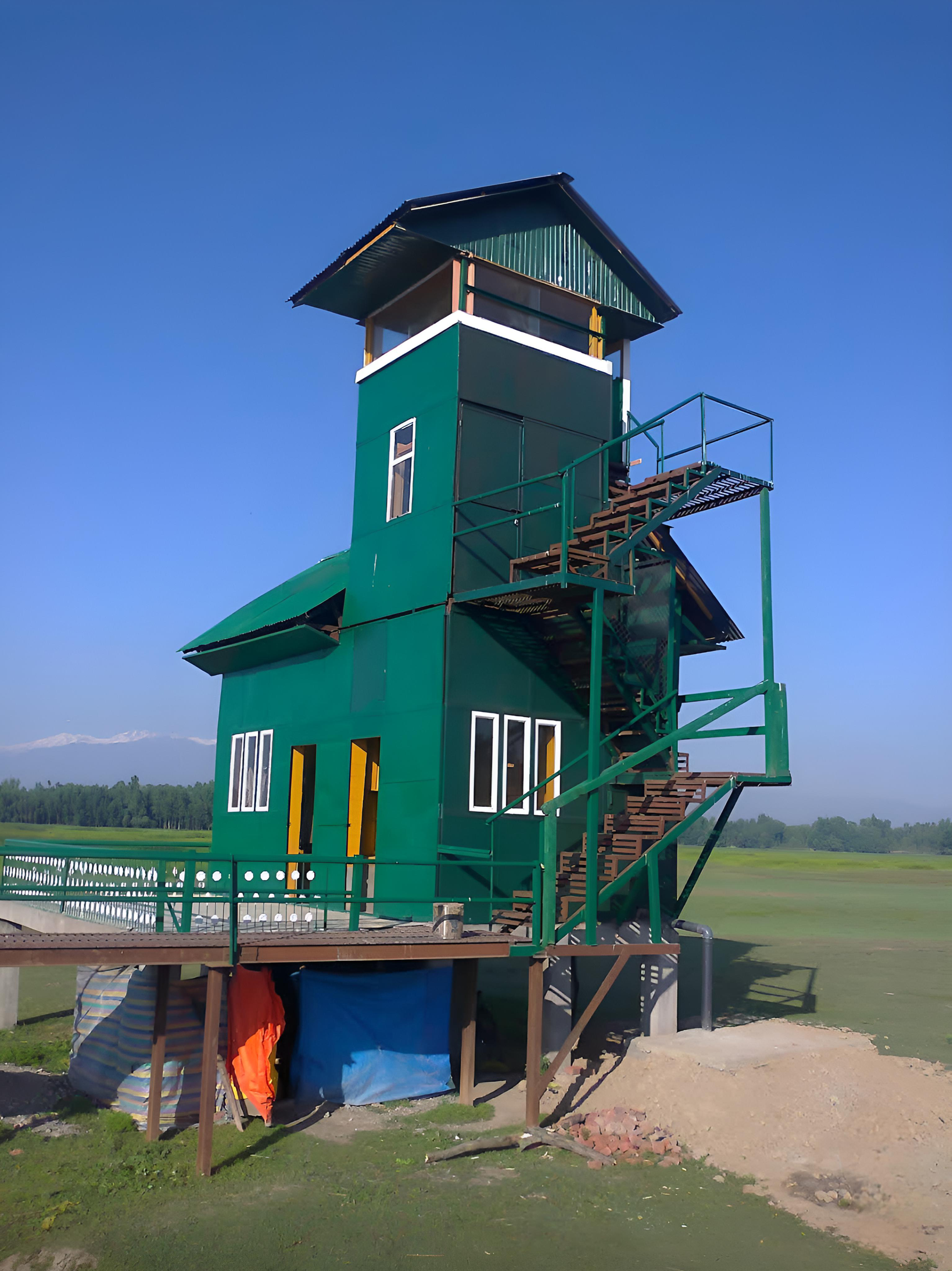
- Bird Watch Tower at Shallabugh Wetland

- Location within Jammu and Kashmir
- Location: Shallabugh, Ganderbal, Jammu and Kashmir, India
- Nearest city: Srinagar city
- Coordinates: 34°09′42″N 74°43′27″E
- Area: 1,675 hectares (4,140 acres)
- Governing body: Jammu & Kashmir Department of Wildlife Protection

Ramsar Wetland
- Designated: 8 June 2022
- Reference no.: 2488

The Shallabugh Wetland is located in Shallabugh Sherpathri area of district Ganderbal, Jammu and Kashmir, India. The Shallabugh Wetland, which spreads over 1,675 hectares (16.75 km^{2}), is a designated bird sanctuary.

== Geography ==
Shallabugh Wetland Conservation Reserve is located to Anchar Lake, which is located at the west end of the Sind River delta and plays an essential role in the local aquatic ecosystems by relying on diverse water sources., it forms a significant habitat for diverse bird species. Together with the nearby Ramsar Site Hosker Wetland, these areas create an important ecological landscape.

The wetland serves as a crucial resource for the local community. It support fisheries, provides clean water, manages flooding, and is a carbon sink. However, it faces a pressing threat in the form of excessive siltation, endangering its unique ecological characteristics.

== Access ==
There are two main routes to access Shallabugh Wetland:

- Pedestrian Route via Paribal Shallabugh:

Located about 8 km from Ganderbal town, this route includes a 1 km pedestrian walkway leading directly to the wetland. It is ideal for walkers, birdwatchers, and local visitors.

- Vehicle Route via Takenwari (from Srinagar):

This route comes straight from Srinagar and is approximately 15 km long. It is motorable and commonly used by eco-tourists and officials visiting the wetland.
