= Khawaja Abdul Samad Wani =

Pakistani journalist and politician

- Born: 2 October 1935; Safapora, Jammu and Kashmir, India
- Died: 31 December 2001 (aged 66); Muzaffarabad, Azad Kashmir, Pakistan
- Education: University of Azad Jammu and Kashmir
- Occupations: Journalist, Chief Editor, Politician, Advisor

Khawaja Abdul Samad Wani (2 October 1935 – 31 December 2001) was a Kashmiri journalist, chief editor and politician. He was born in Safapora, Jammu and Kashmir and died in Muzaffarabad, Azad Kashmir. He was the owner of the largest weekly newspapers named Weekly Kasheer and Weekly Azad Kashmir. He was the special advisor to the prime minister of Azad Kashmir at the time of his death.
