= Shallabugh =

Village in Kashmir

- Tourist Village
- Shallabugh/Shalla Bug
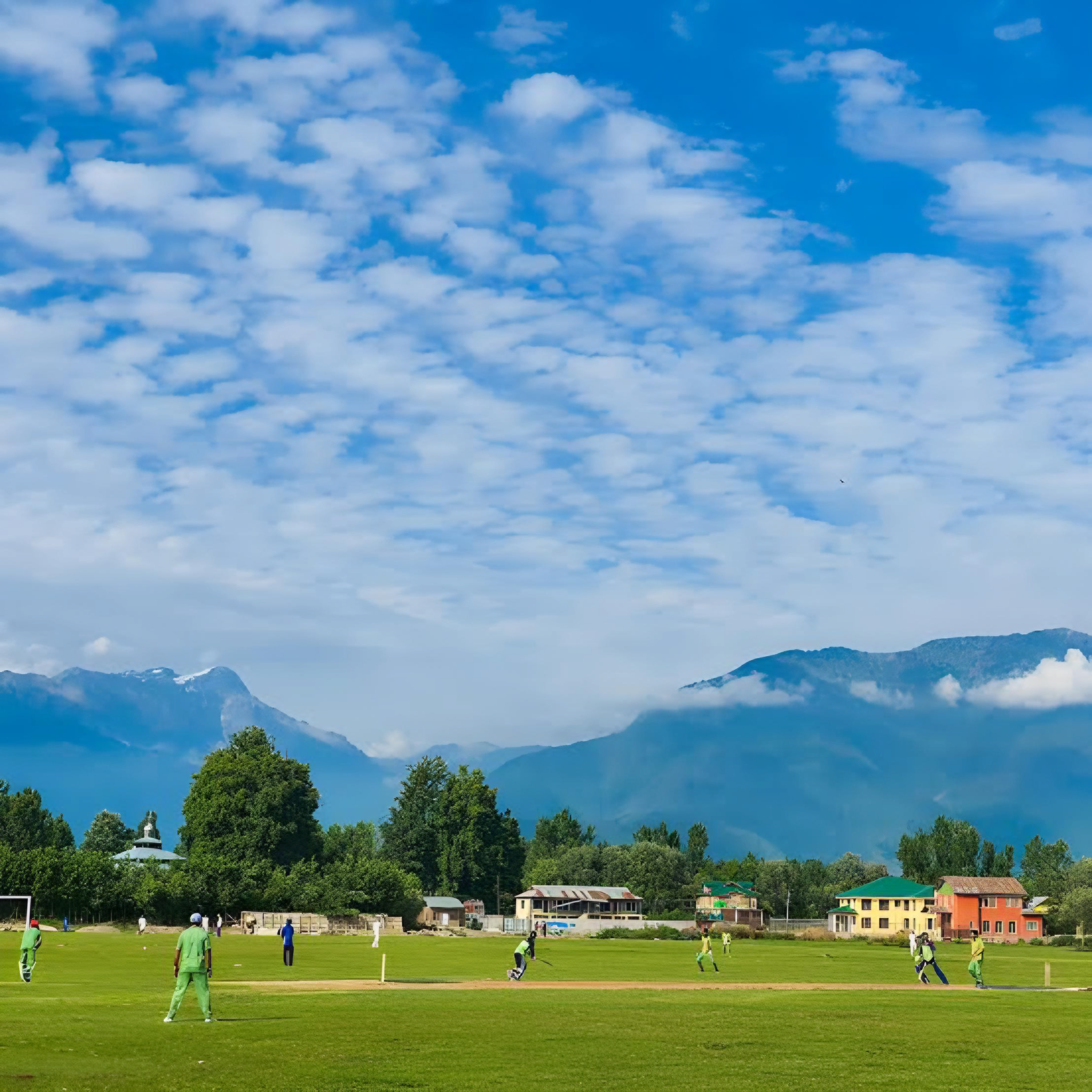
- Shallabugh Playground

- Location within Jammu and Kashmir Location within India
- Coordinates: 34.16792°N 74.73832°E
- Country: India
- Union territory: Jammu and Kashmir
- District: Ganderbal
- Elevation: 5,229 m (17,156 ft)
- Demonym: Shalbuguk or Shalbugi

Languages
  - Official: Kashmiri, Urdu, Hindi & English
- Time zone: UTC+5:30 (IST)
- PIN: 191131
- Vehicle registration: JK-16

Shallabugh is a tourist village in Sherpathri, a block of Tullamulla tehsil of Central Kashmir's Ganderbal district in the union territory of Jammu and Kashmir, India.

== Location ==
Shallabugh village is considered Sherpathri's largest village, spanning two rivers in Kashmir. The total area of Shallabugh is 2243.6 hectares. The main village, Shallabugh-A, rests along the Sind River and includes Addah Mohalla, Mokdam Mohalla, Astan Mohalla, Umar Colony, Shah-e-Hamdan Colony, Sama Mohalla, Khanday Mohallah, Laway Mohalla, Tul Mohalla, Pethkundal, and Paribal. Shallabugh-B, locally known as Taken Wari Pora or Pati-Shallabugh, is situated along the Jehlum River and comprises Dar Mohalla, Khan Mohalla, Gori Mohalla, Gund-Roshan, and Gaasi Mohalla.

== Etymology ==
The name "Shallabugh" has originated from the Kashmiri words (شالہٕ بۆگ) where “Shaal” (شال), means golden jackal, and “Bugh” (بۆگ), meaning garden or orchard. In Kashmiri toponymy, "Bugh" is a common suffix used to denote areas associated with greenery, plantations, or cultivated land. Hence, "Shaalbugh" can be interpreted as “the garden of golden jackals.” The area is covered with dense plantations that served as a habitat for golden jackals, which preyed on waterfowl and domestic poultry, often causing distress to the local population. The name eventually evolved into its Urdunised form "Shallabugh" (also spelled as "Shalla Bug") (شالہ بگ), as commonly used in administrative and written records.

== See also ==
- Shallabugh Wetland
- Sind River
- Jehlum River
- Anchar Lake
- Ganderbal District
- Sherpathri
- Srinagar District
- Paribal Shallabugh
