= Babawayil =

Village in Jammu and Kashmir, India

Babawayil (Baba Wayil)
- Village
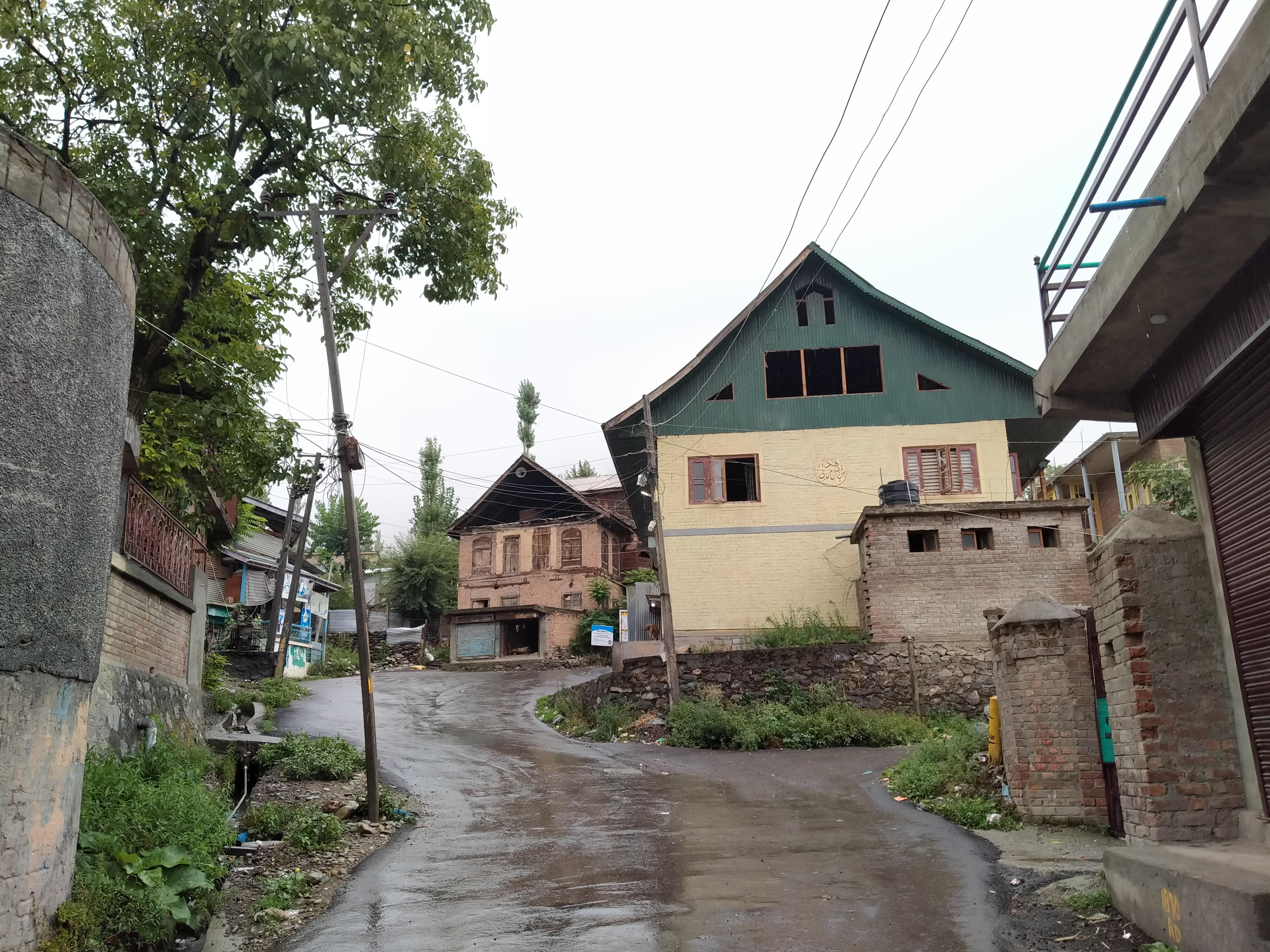

- Location in Jammu and Kashmir, India
- Coordinates: 34.1619°N 74.4920°E
- Country: India
- Union territory: Jammu and Kashmir
- District: Ganderbal

Population
  - Total: 1,330+

Languages
  - Spoken: Kashmiri, Urdu, Pashto, English
- Time zone: UTC+5:30 (IST)
- Postal code: 191201

Babawayil, also known as Baba Wayil and The dowry free village is a small village in Indian-administered Kashmir's Ganderbal district, around 30 km away from Srinagar, and at an elevation of 1786 meters (5859 feet). It is known for its banning of dowries.
