= Rangil water treatment plant =

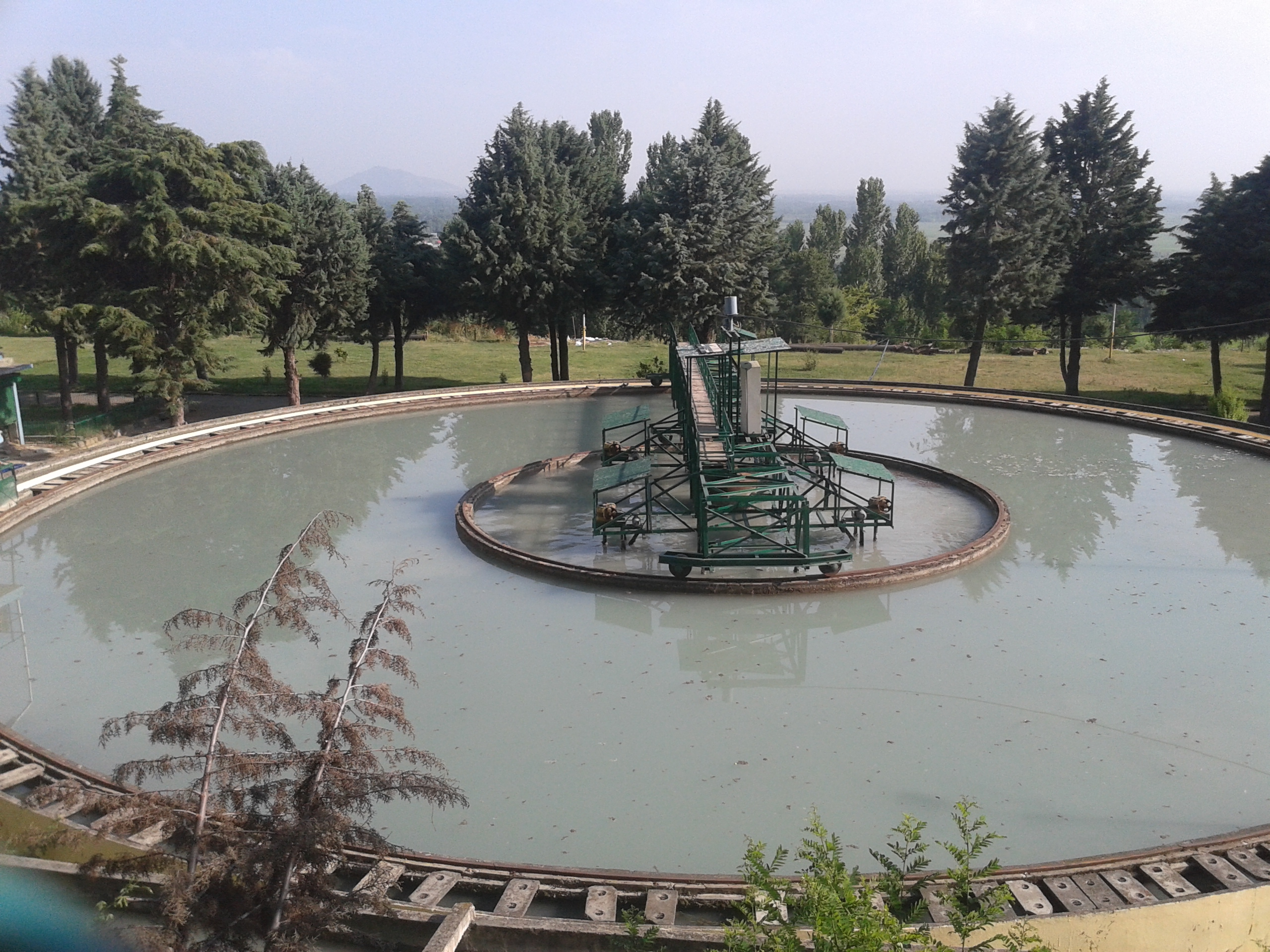
Rangil water treatment plant flocculator

Rangil water treatment plant is situated on rangil mountain of Ganderbal district about 21 km from commercial centre of Kashmir. The water project was inaugurated by Farooq Abdullah on 15 March 2010 and its cost was estimated as Rs 31 crore.

== Construction ==
The project was completed by Economic Reconstruction Agency (ERA) and was handed over to Public Health Engineering department of Kashmir on the same day. The main aim of the project was to provide fresh drinking water to the people of Srinagar. The construction company under Rangil water supply project has liad 51.63 km long pipeline which has been tested for efficiency across the city.

== Features ==
The filtration plant has water storing capacity of 10 MGD (million gallons per day). The water in the plant comes from Sind River which runs through the heart of Ganderbal district. The water treatment plant is also installed with electromagnetic and mechanical flow meters at the control room of the plant and at bifurcation points to regulate water supply as per demand.

== Treatment process ==
The water entering the plant at the first place undergoes screening and after that alum is added to aid sedimentation. The setter water enters 10 filtration units from where it is transported for disinfection using chlorine in disinfection unit. The water thus obtained is stored in storage reserviours for supply purposes.

== See also ==
- 1 Gallon=3.785 Litres
