= Manasbal Lake =

Lake in Jammu and Kashmir, India

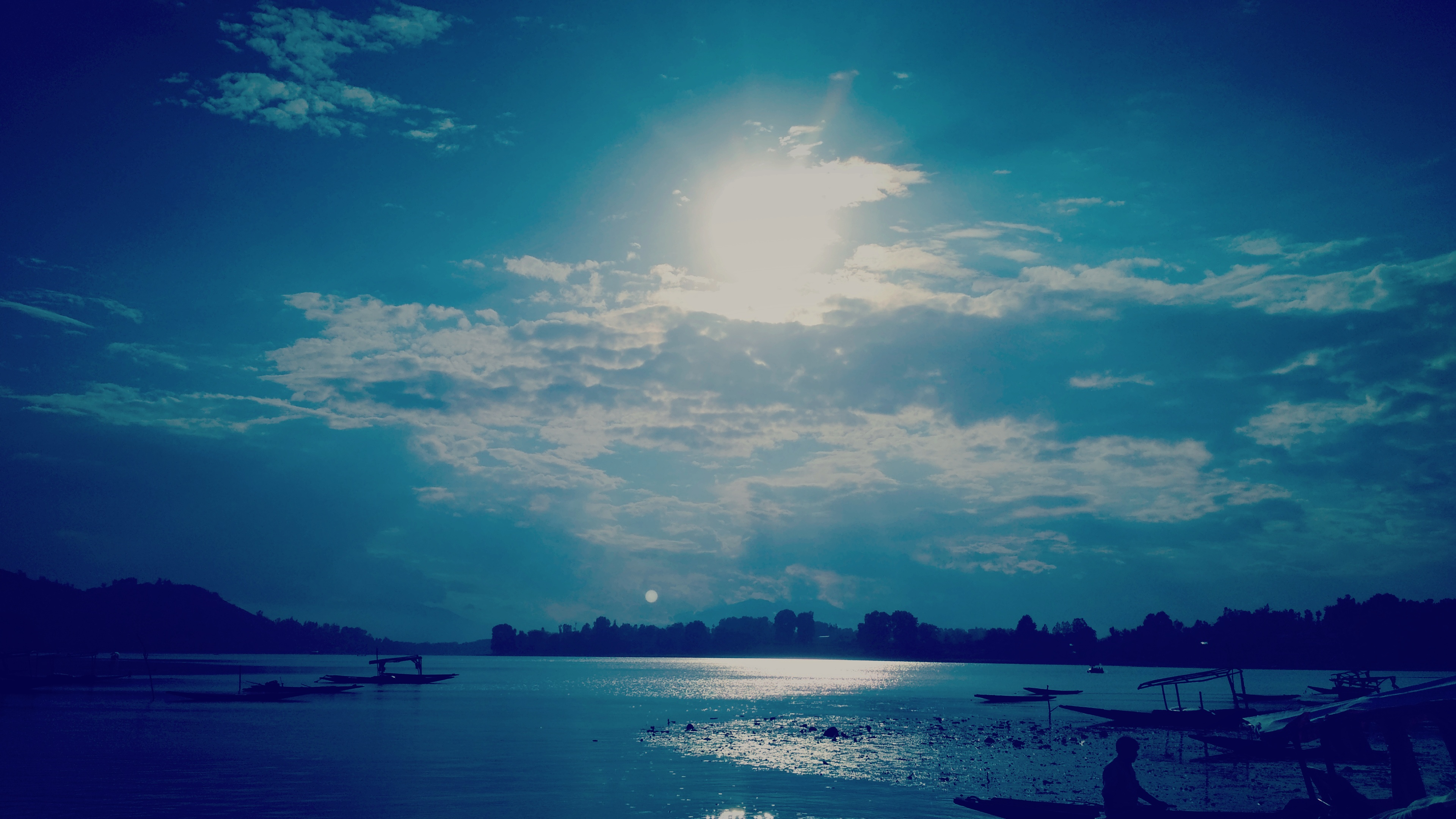
- View of Manasbal Lake

- Location within Jammu and Kashmir
- Location: Ganderbal district, Jammu and Kashmir, India
- Coordinates: 34°15′N 74°40′E
- Lake type: Fresh water
- Catchment area: 33 km^{2} (13 sq mi)
- Basin countries: India
- Max. length: 5 km (3.1 mi)
- Max. width: 1 km (0.62 mi)
- Surface area: 2.81 km^{2} (1.08 sq mi)
- Average depth: 4.5 m (15 ft)
- Max. depth: 13 m (43 ft)
- Water volume: 0.0128 km^{3} (0.0031 cu mi)
- Residence time: 1.2 years
- Shore length^{1}: 10.2 km (6.3 mi)
- Surface elevation: 1,583 m (5,194 ft)
- Settlements: Kondabal
- ^{1} Shore length is not a well-defined measure.

Manasbal Lake is the deepest freshwater lake found in the Safapora area of Ganderbal district of Jammu and Kashmir, India. Named after the sacred Manasarovar. The lake is encircled by four villages, viz., Jarokbal, Kondabal, Nesbal (situated on the north-eastern side of the lake), and Gratbal. It's renowned for its lotus blooms (Nelumbo nucifera) at the periphery of the lake (blooms during July and August) adds to the beauty of the clear waters of the lake. The Mughal garden, called the Jaroka Bagh (meaning bay window), built by Nur Jahan, overlooks the lake.

The lake is a popular place for birdwatching as it is one of the largest natural spawning grounds of Aquatic birds in Kashmir and has the epithet "supreme gem of all Kashmir Lakes". The rootstocks of the lotus plant, which grows extensively in the lake, are harvested and marketed, and also eaten by the local people.

== Access ==
The lake is approached from Srinagar by a 30-kilometre (19 mi) road via Shadipora, Nasim, and Ganderbal. The road to Wular Lake, the largest lake in Kashmir, passes through this lake via Safapora. It is also easy to reach Manasbal from Sonmarg via Ganderbal.

== History ==
It is believed to be an ancient lake by locals, but exact dating is yet to be done. Close to the northern shore of the lake are the ruins of a 17th-century fort, called the Jharokha Bagh, built by the Mughals, used in the past by caravans traveling from Punjab to Kashmir.

== Topography ==
The lake is surrounded by the Baladar mountains on the east, by an elevated plateau known as 'Karewa' comprising lacustrine, fluviatile, and loessic deposits on the north, and bounded by the Ahtung hills in the south, which are used for limestone extraction.

Along the course of the Jhelum River, the Manasbal Lake falls under the third series of high altitude lakes of the Himalayas (designated concerning their origin, altitudinal situation and nature of biota they contain) as the valley lakes (Dal, Anchar Lake, Manasbal etc.) situated at the altitudinal zone of 1,585–1,600 m (5,200–5,249 ft); the other two types being the high altitude wetlands (altitude 1,585–4,000 m or 5,200–13,123 ft amsl) of the second series of lakes (Nilnag) in the lower fringes of Pir Panjal ranges right amid pine forests, and the glaciated lakes of the first series situated on the inner Himalayas between 3,000–4,000 m (9,800–13,100 ft) amsl (Alipathar, Sheshnag, Kounsarnag, Tar Sar, Marsar, Vishansar, Gangbal, Kishan Sar, Kyo Tso, Pangong Tso, etc.) which have probably originated during the third Himalayan glaciation. A fissure is reported to be running from east to west at the centre of the lake.

=== Land use ===
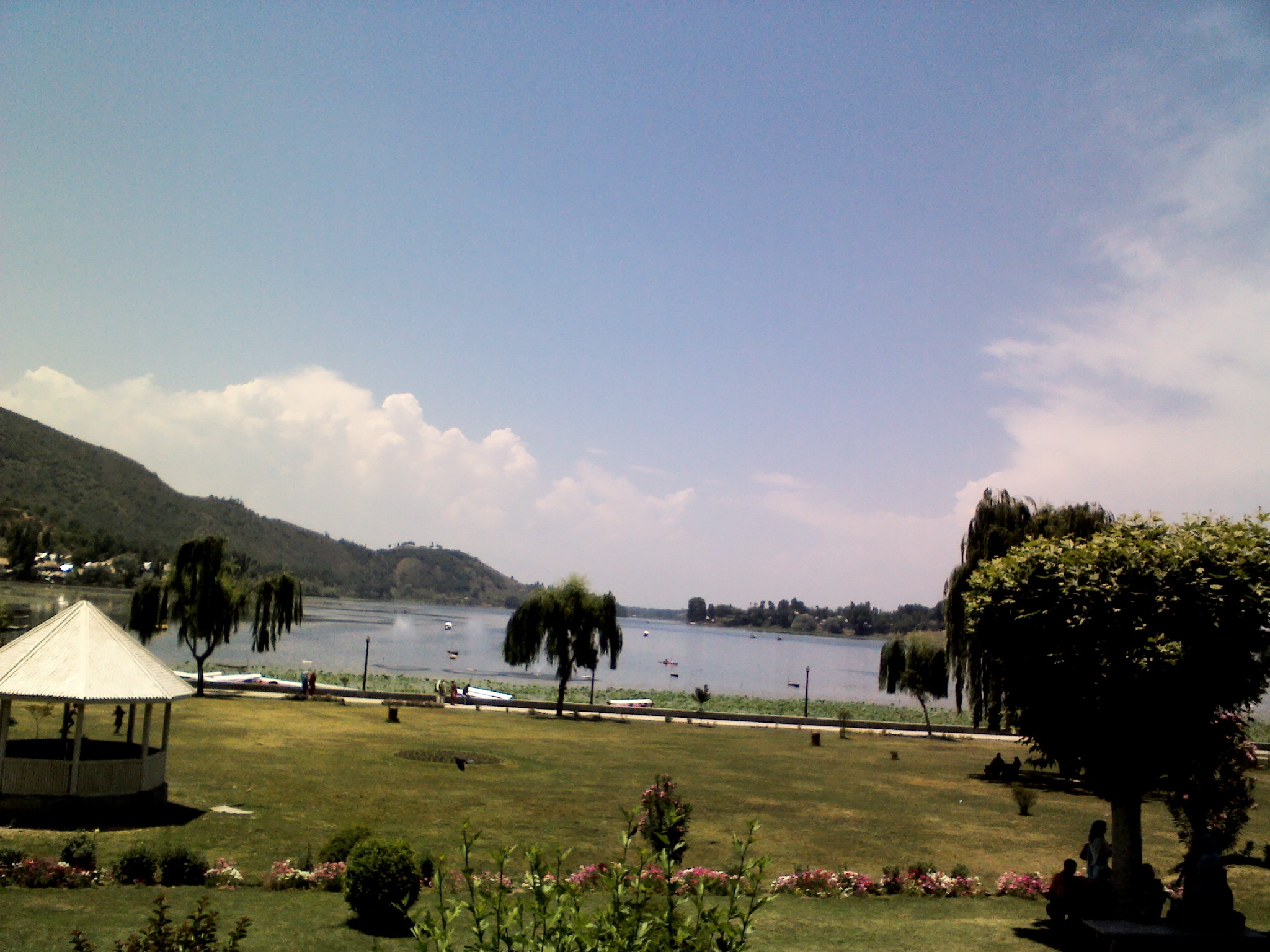
Manasbal lake

Important vegetation in the catchment of the lake comprises Orchards (apple, mulberry), some Platanus (Chinar trees), and Salix trees. Safar, adjacent to Safapur, contains an extensive grove of Chinar trees, known as Badshah Boni, royal Chinar, and was planted in imitation of the Nasim Bagh in Srinagar. Maize, mustard, and wheat are generally the main crops grown in the agricultural lands of the catchment. In recent years, land use patterns have changed with more land used for horticulture and also diversion of land for construction purposes.

== Hydrology ==
The drainage basin for the lake, covering an area of 10 km^{2} (3.9 sq mi), has no major inlet channels and is thus fed mainly by precipitation (rain and snow fall) and springs (more than 1,200 springs). Lake water outflows to the Jhelum River through a regulated outflow channel. The lake is the source of water for fishing and for obtaining food and fodder plants.

The lake not only provides a source of water but also offers facilities for navigation and transportation, fisheries, harvesting of economically useful plants, sightseeing, tourism, and recreation.

== Water quality issues ==
Some of the water quality parameters reported relate to:

- The lake is a monomictic mixing type and develops thermal stratification from March to November. The maximum depth of the Thermocline is 9 metres (30 ft). Hypolimnion temperature ranges from 8.5 °C (47.3 °F) to 11 °C (52 °F).
- pH value varied from a maximum of 8.8 on the surface to a minimum of 7.7 at 11 metres (36 ft) depth in year over the 12 months.
- DO [mg l-1] value varied from a maximum of 10.4 on the surface to a minimum of 2.2 at the bottom in year over the 12 months.
- Maximum Nitrogen Concentration (NH4-N [micro l-1] of 13 on the surface and 120 at the bottom of the lake has been reported.
- The lake water temperature varied from a minimum of 6 °C (43 °F) in January to 27.5 °C (81.5 °F) in June/July at the surface and correspondingly 6 °C (43 °F) and 19 °C (66 °F), at the bottom of the lake.

=== Flora ===
Within the lake water, the flora recorded comprises the following.

- Emerged macrophytes, floating macrophytes, submerged macrophytes, and phytoplankton. In the reported period, the biomass production due to plankton was a maximum of 864.9 milligrams/cm^{2} in June, with a minimum of 54 milligrams/cm^{2} in December.

== Fauna ==
The fauna recorded in the lake includes zooplankton, benthos, and fish. The economically important fishes reported are:

- Schizothorax niger, S. esocinus, Cyprinus carpio specularis+, C. carpio communis+ and Neomacheilus latius.

Note: + considered economically important

Cyprinus, an exotic species, has proliferated extensively after its introduction in 1956. A decline in the population of indigenous species due to rapid changes in the environment was reported.

== Deterioration of the lake ==
Eutrophication was recorded and confirmed by the test results in the lake. Ceratophyllum demersum recorded an increase in the lake area. Dense mono-specific stands have been created by the weeds. Further, a decrease in species diversity has occurred, an increase in the period of anoxic conditions, and accumulation of H_{2}S in deeper waters have been reported. Pollution has also taken place due to a lack of wastewater treatment plants.

World Wide Fund for Nature (WWF), which conducted an extensive survey of the lake in 1997, attributed the reasons for the deterioration of the lake, particularly on its banks, gradually turning it into a stinking marsh, to the following.

1. Large-scale illegal encroachment on the periphery of Ganderbal and Qazibagh sides in the form of hundreds of trees, vegetable gardens, toilets, residential structures, garbage dumping sites
2. Siltation due to noxious run-off from adjoining fields, stone quarries, and lime kilns;
3. The flow of sewage and the use of fertilizers in the agricultural fields in its adjoining villages
4. 80 per cent of the lake was seen under the thick blanket of weed

WWF recommended several measures to be undertaken for the restoration of the lake.

== Lake restoration works ==
It was only in the year 2007 that lake restoration measures could be undertaken with the formation of the Wular-Manasbal Development Authority (WMDA) under the Government of Jammu and Kashmir.

WMDA undertook the following measures for restoration and to improve the general environment of the lake.

- Removing the illegal constructions;
- Pedestrian walkway/pathway construction around the lake periphery of 11 km (6.8 mi)
- Manual de-weeding
- Dredging
- Demarcation of the lake
- Construction of STPs and
- Regulation of limestone extraction and afforestation of mountains to restore the lake's glory

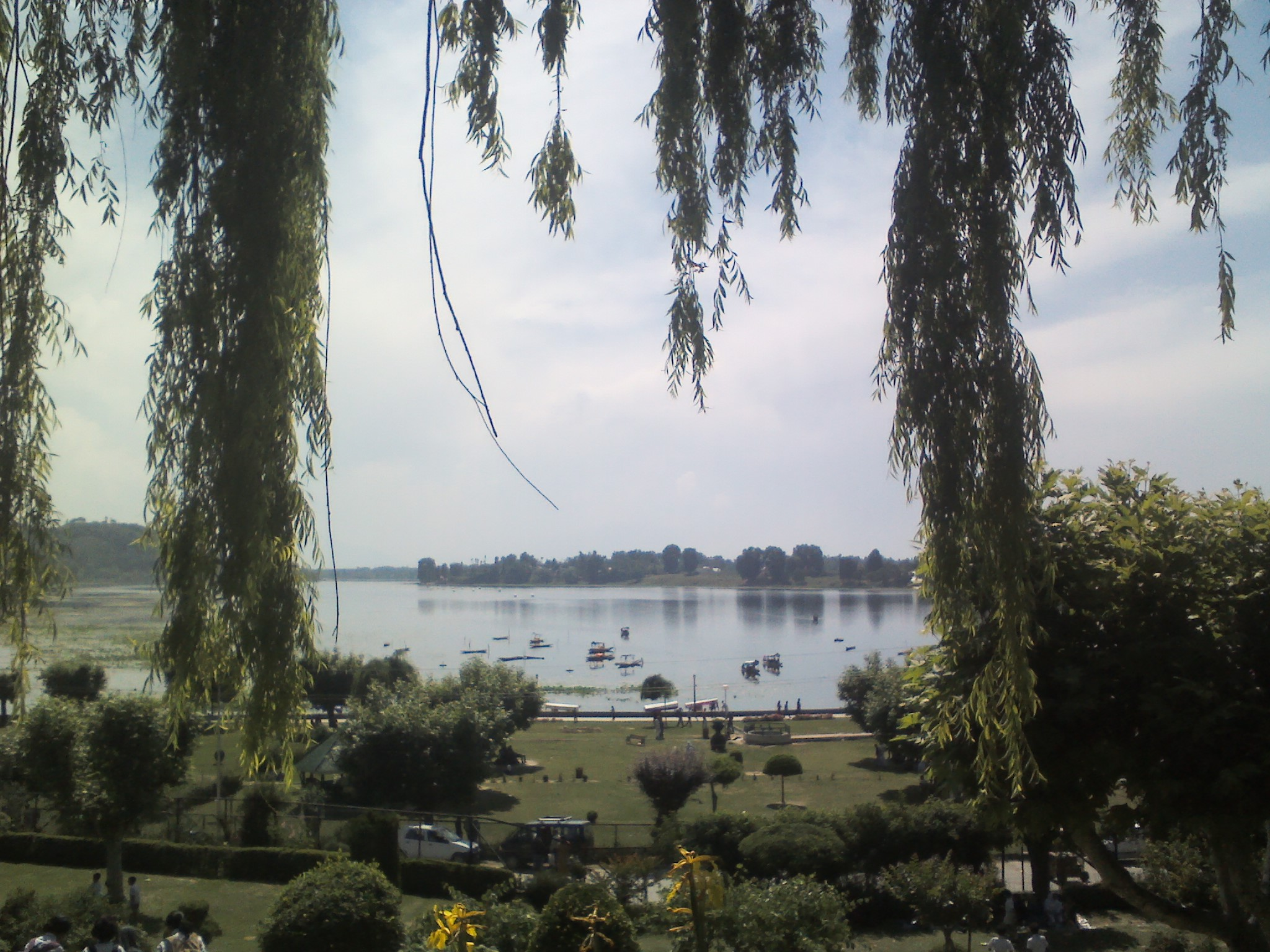
Manasbal lake from the shade of a Willow tree

The chief executive officer of the WMDA has been reported as stating that:

It was after long deliberations with locals that we could start work on the lake. We made the locals understand that Manasbal’s conservation was imperative not only from tourism point of view, but for their livelihood too. Now, there is community participation in the restoration process.

A Shikara operator of the Lake area has reported that "there has been a lot of improvement in its condition".

== Hindu temple ==
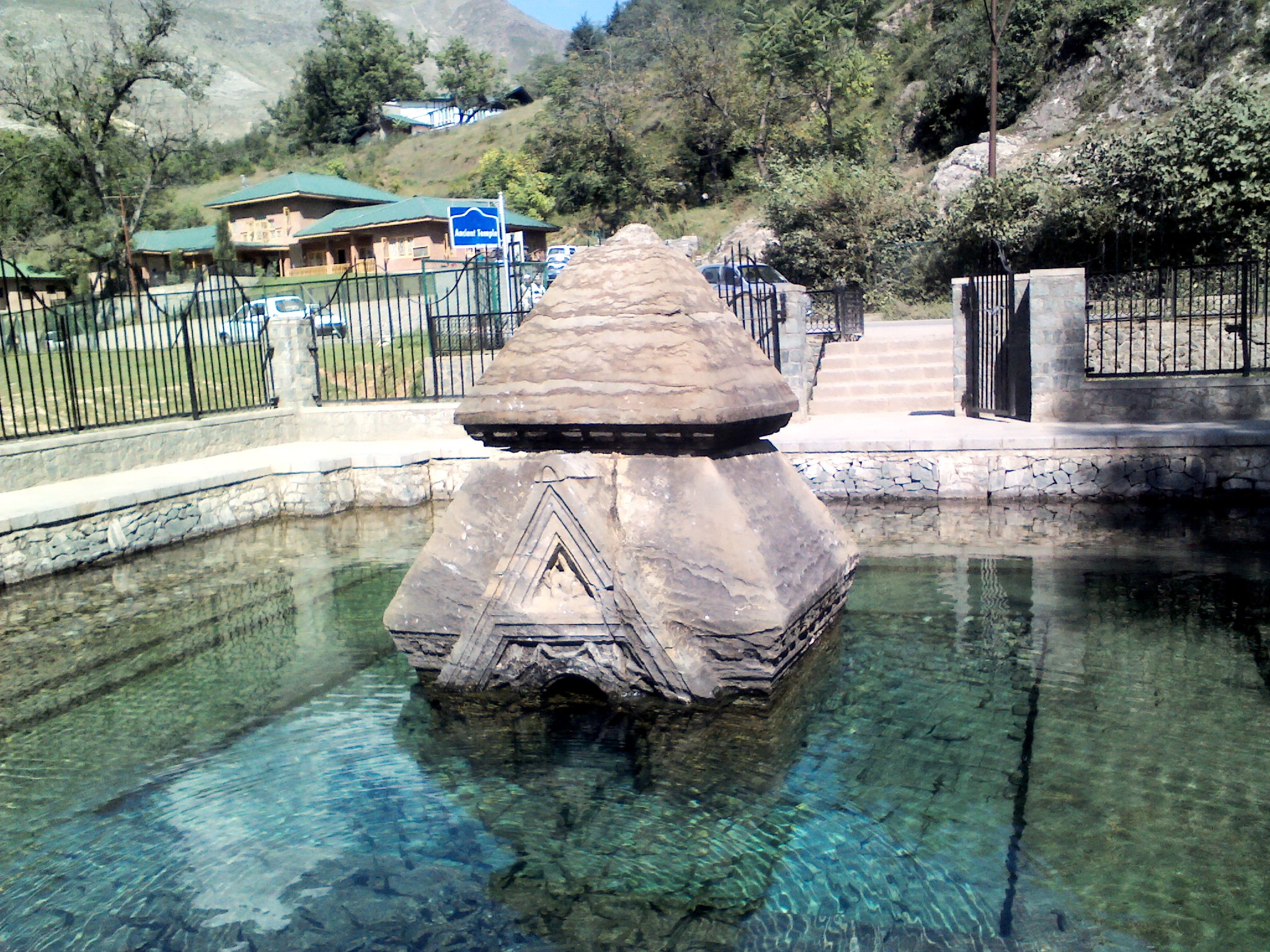
An ancient Hindu temple near the eastern and western shores of Manasbal Lake in Kashmir

Wullar-Manasbal Development Authority has reported the unearthing of an ancient Hindu temple on the eastern shore of the Manasbal Lake, built in the traditional architectural style of ancient Kashmir. The lower half of the temple, which was buried in the earth, was found during the restoration works undertaken for the lake. Dated to 800-900 AD, during Avantivarman or Sankaravarman rule, based on epigraphic writings, the temple, constructed in local grey stone, has a unique pyramid-shaped rooftop with Corinthian or floral motifs. It is stated to be a new pilgrimage attraction for pilgrims who visit the cave shrine at Amarnath and the Kheer Bhawani temple at Tulmulla in Ganderbal district. Other tourist attractions in the lake area are the Manasbal Temple, the ruins of a terraced Mughal garden and sculptured stones of some Sufi shrines on the banks of the lake.

== Naval training of NCC ==
National Cadet Corps (NCC) started its activities in Kashmir in 1965, but the training facility at Manasbal Lake was abandoned in 1989 due to the deterioration of the security situation in Jammu and Kashmir. In September 2022, the Indian Navy revived its naval training of the National Cadet Corps at the Manasbal lake. 100 NCC cadets, including girls from various colleges of Jammu and Kashmir, participate in the camp. A suitable camping site along with adequate infrastructure has been provided by the Manasbal Development Authority on the lakefront. The cadets are trained in various activities like boat pulling, sailing, signalling, and ship modelling. Earlier, due to closure, these activities were carried out in Nagrota and Mansar Lake, Jammu.

== See also ==
- Nigeen Lake
- Nundkol Lake
- Khanpursar
- Wular Lake
