= Gangabal Lake =

Lake in Jammu & Kashmir, India

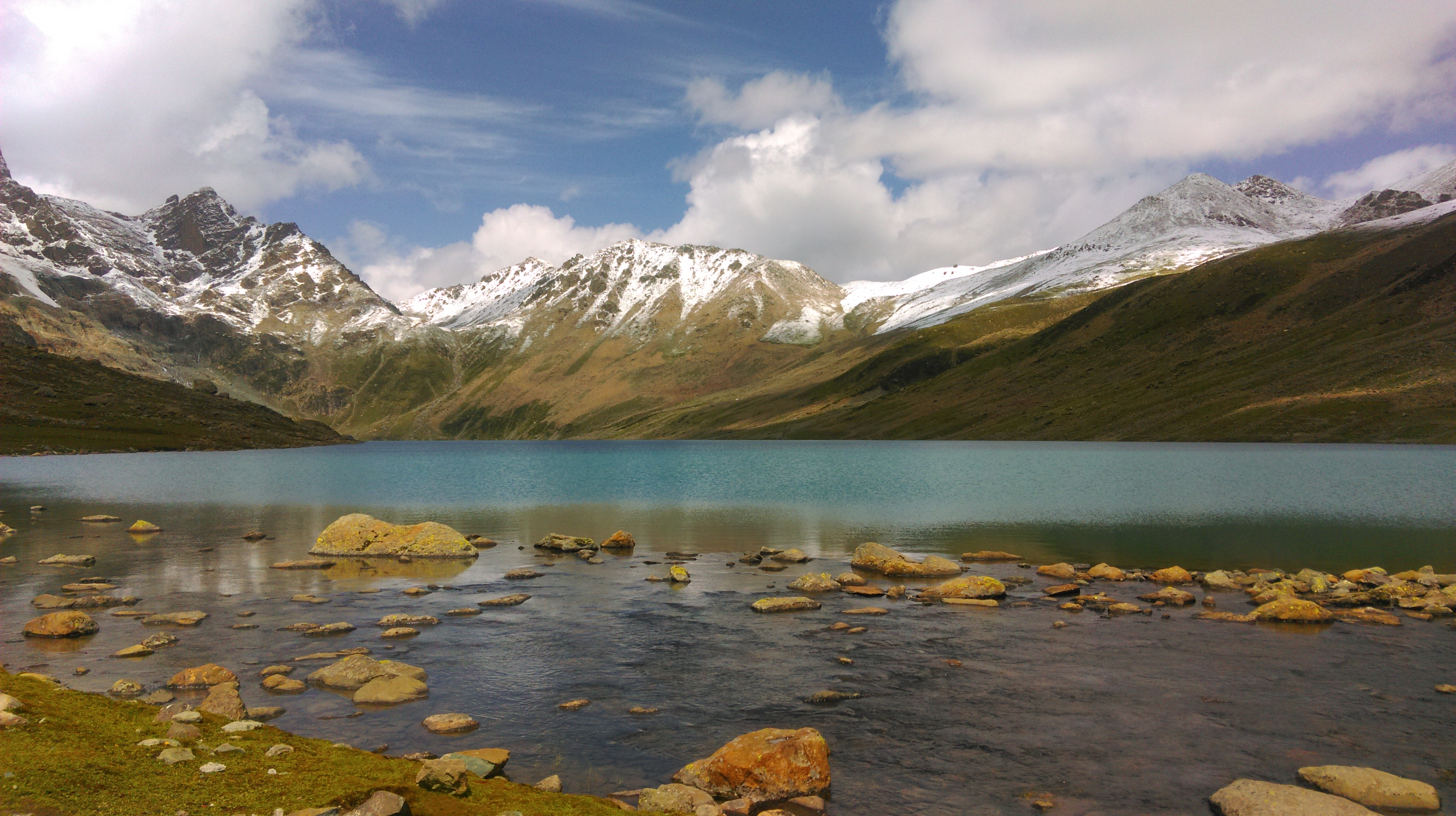
- Gangabal Lake at the foot of Harmukh

- Location in Jammu and Kashmir Gangabal Lake (India)
- Location: Ganderbal district, Jammu and Kashmir
- Coordinates: 34°25′55″N 74°55′33″E
- Type: Oligotrophic lake
- Primary inflows: Melting glaciers
- Primary outflows: Nundkol Lake, which drains into Sind River
- Basin countries: India
- Max. length: 2.7 km (1.7 mi)
- Max. width: 1 km (0.62 mi)
- Surface elevation: 3,576 m (11,732 ft)
- Frozen: November to April

Gangabal Lake (lit. 'place of Ganga'), also called Haramukh Ganga, is a high-altitude glacial lake situated at the foot of Mount Harmukh in the Himalayas of Jammu and Kashmir, India. The lake has a maximum length of 2.5 kilometres (1.6 mi) and a maximum width of 1 kilometre (0.62 mi), and is located in the Ganderbal district. It is fed by precipitation, glaciers, and springs, is oligotrophic in nature and is home to many species of fish, including the brown trout. Water from the lake flows into the nearby Nundkol Lake and then into Sind River, of which it is considered the source per tradition, via Wangath Nallah. This lake is considered sacred in Hinduism as one of the abodes of Shiva, is a site of Hindu pilgrimage and used by Kashmiri Hindus to perform ancestral and death rites.

== History ==
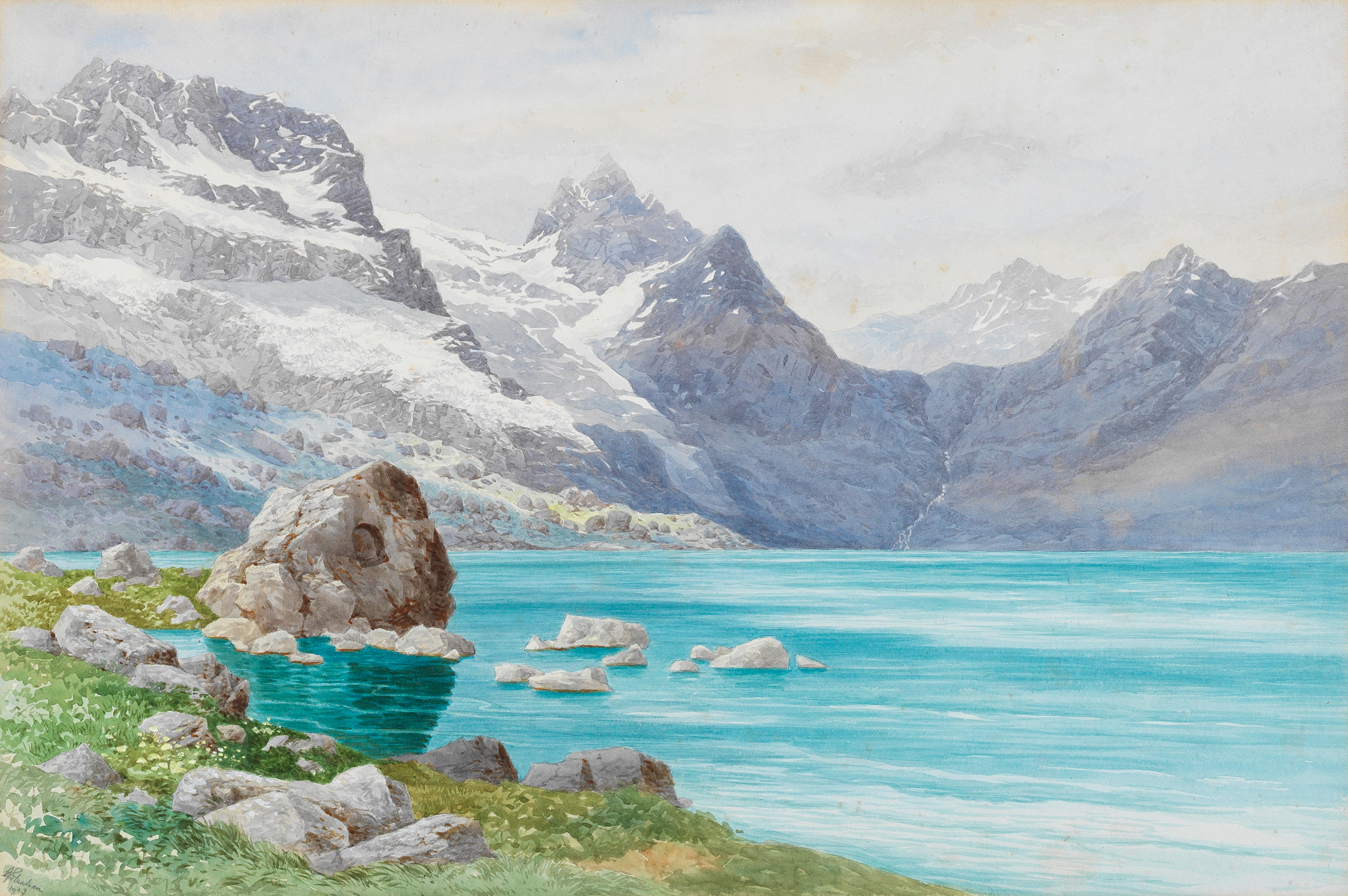
1903 painting of the lake, showing the shrine on the left

Gangabal has been mentioned in several ancient Hindu Sanskrit texts, where it is referred to as Uttaramanasa and Uttara ganga (lit. 'northern Ganga'). It is mentioned in the Mahabharata as a place of pilgrimage in Kaśmira, along with the Kalodaka or Nandikunda lake (Nundkol). The Vishnu Smriti mentions the lake as a place of pilgrimage for performing Śrāddha. It is also mentioned as a place of pilgrimage in other Hindu texts, such as the Nilamata Purana, as well as in chronicles such as the Rajatarangini. In 1519, approximately 10,000 Kashmiri Brahmins died, possibly due to landslides and early snowstorms near Mahlish Meadow during their pilgrimage to Gangabal while immersing the ashes of Kashmiri Hindus who were killed by Mir Shams-ud-Din Araqi on the day of Ashura. British authors such as Walter Roper Lawrence, Cecil Tyndale-Biscoe, and Francis Younghusband, who visited Kashmir during British colonial rule in India, also mentioned Gangabal Lake and its association with Hindu rites. In 1943, Vikram Sarabhai, along with a team, measured cosmic rays near the lake.

== Religious significance ==
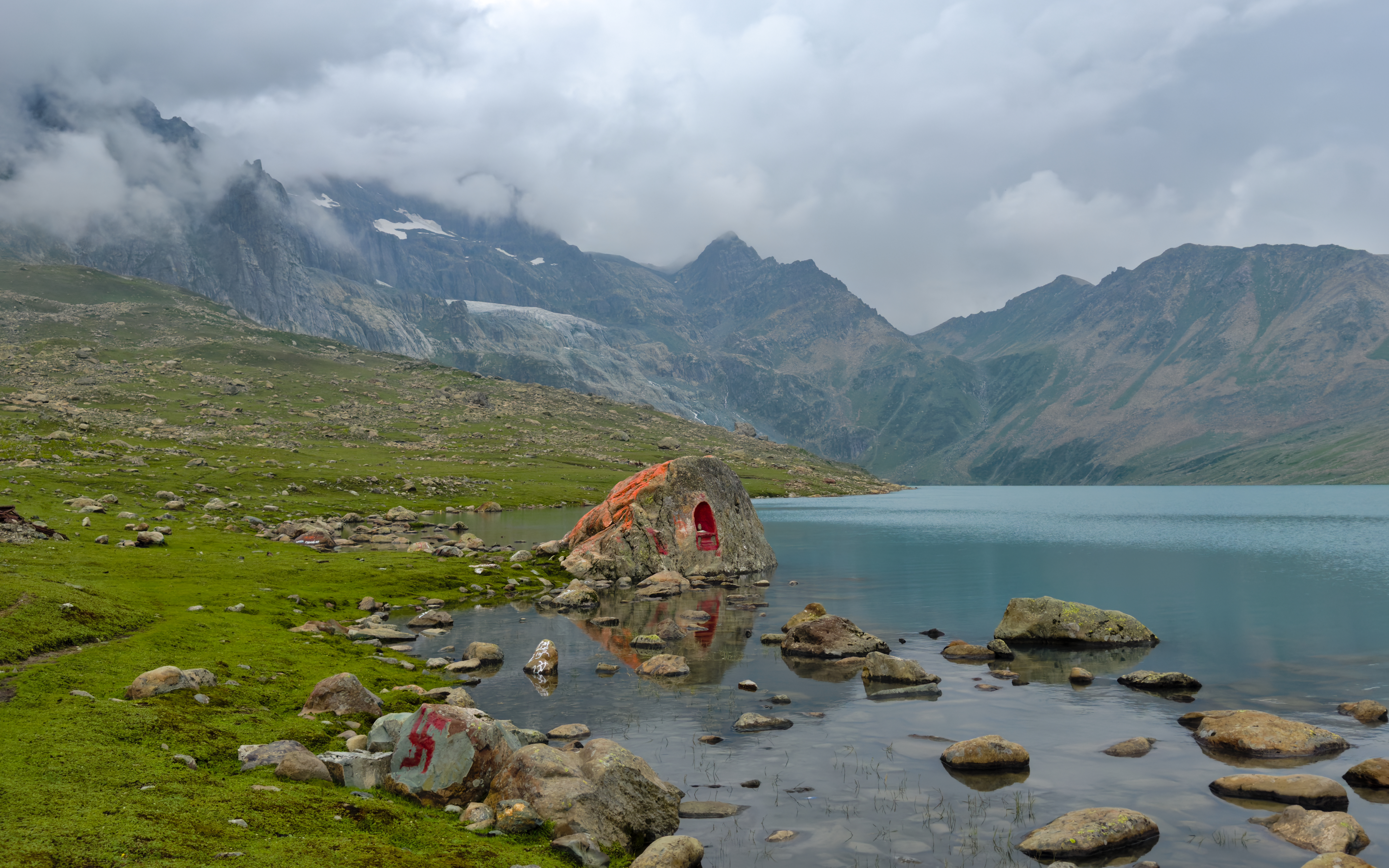
Shiva shrine at the Gangabal Lake

Gangabal Lake is sacred for Hindus, who consider it a manifestation of Ganga and the region to be an abode of Shiva. Kashmiri Hindus immerse the ashes of their dead after cremation in the lake, and consider it equivalent to the river Ganga and Haridwar for performing ancestral rites. An annual pilgrimage, called Harmukh-Gangabal Yatra, starts from the nearby 8th-century Wangath Temple complex at Naranag. The lake is also invoked during the rituals of Kaaw Punim, a Kashmiri Hindu festival. It is considered the traditional source of the Sind River.

== Access ==
Gangbal Lake is approached from Srinagar, 45 kilometers by road via Ganderbal up to Naranag, and then a trek of 15 kilometers upslope leads to the lake, which can be covered by a horse ride or on foot. The Gujjar shepherds can be seen during the trek with their flocks of sheep and goats. Another trek (25 kilometers long) leads to the lake site from Sonamarg via the Vishansar Lake, crossing three mountain passes, Nichnai pass, Gadsar pass, and Zajibal pass of an average elevation of 4100 meters. It can also be accessed through a trek from Bandipore via Arin and from Gurez via Tilel. The trek to the lake Gangabal takes place in an alpine environment, (cut crossing) with meadows, (cut from) and huts of Gujjars with their herds crossing through two passes over 4,000 m to get to the lake Gangabal.

== Gallery ==
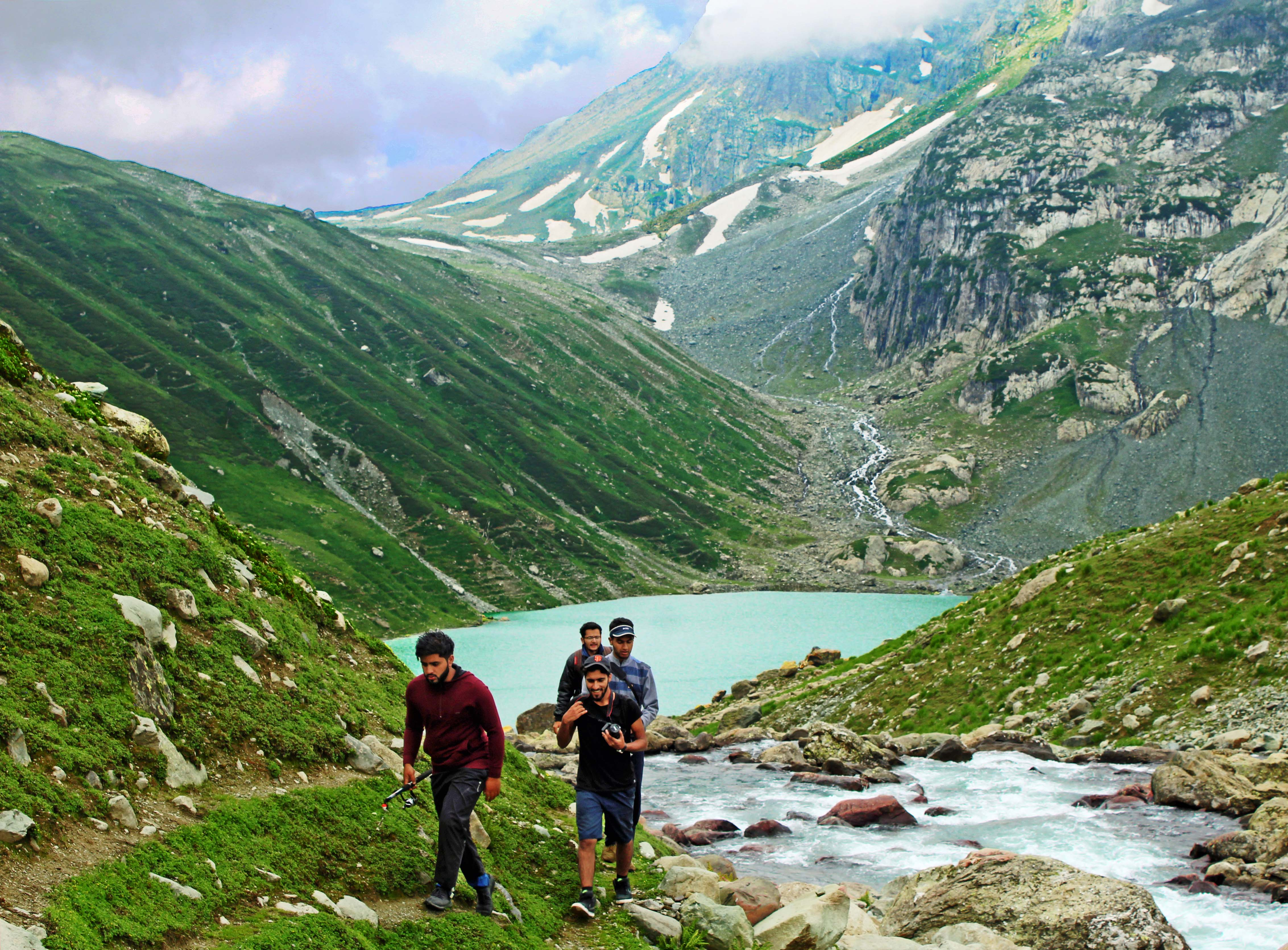

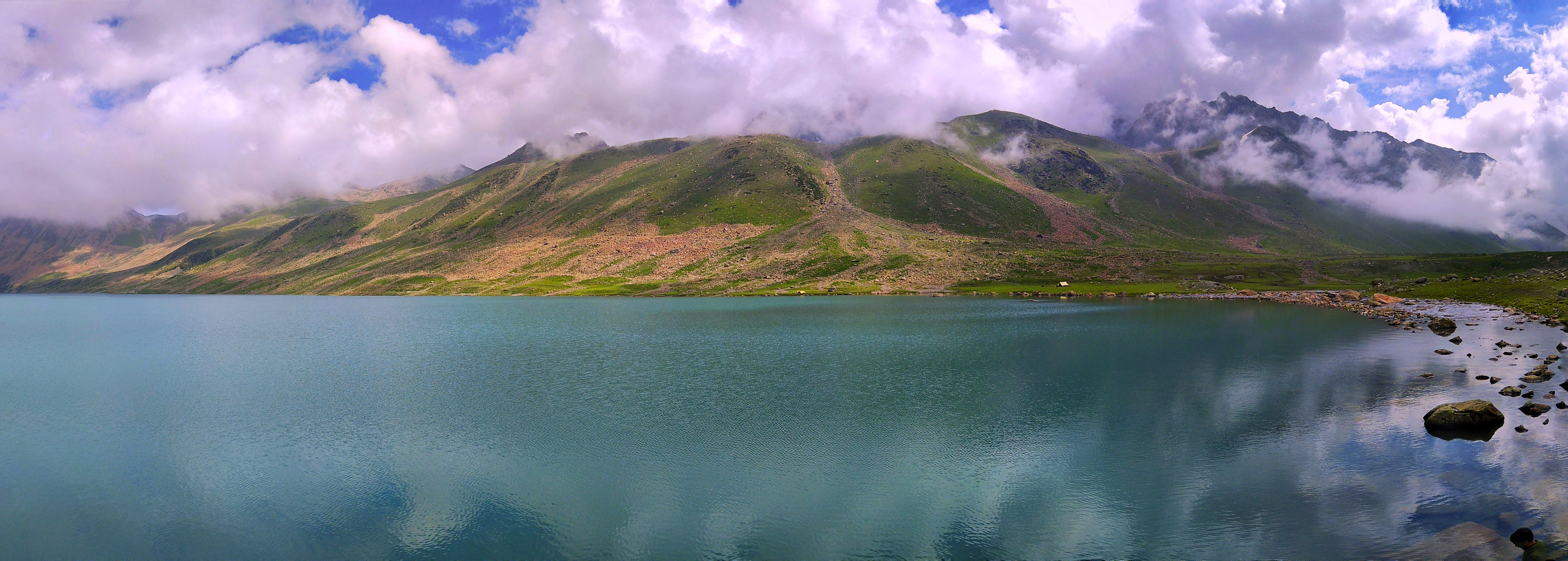

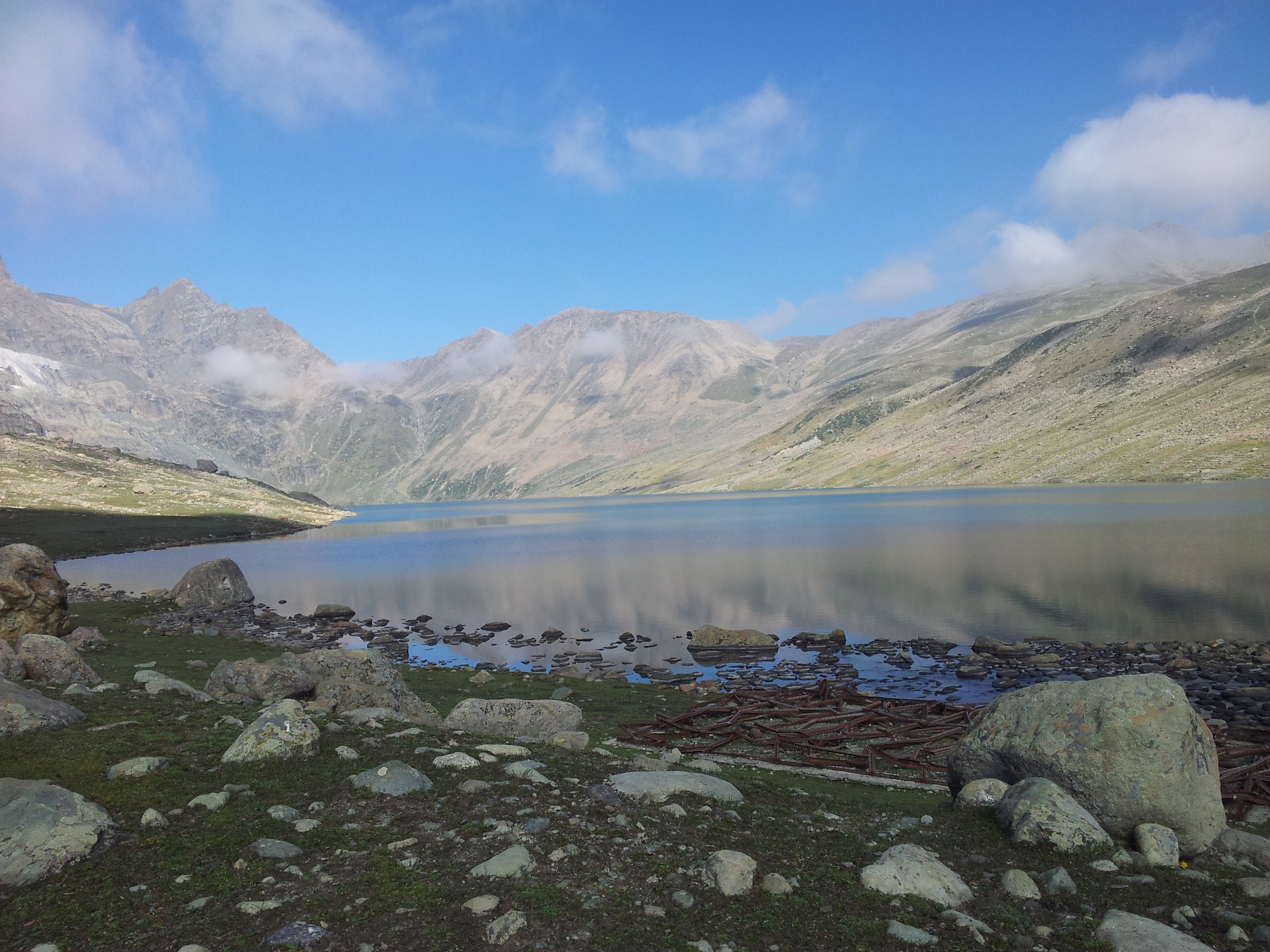

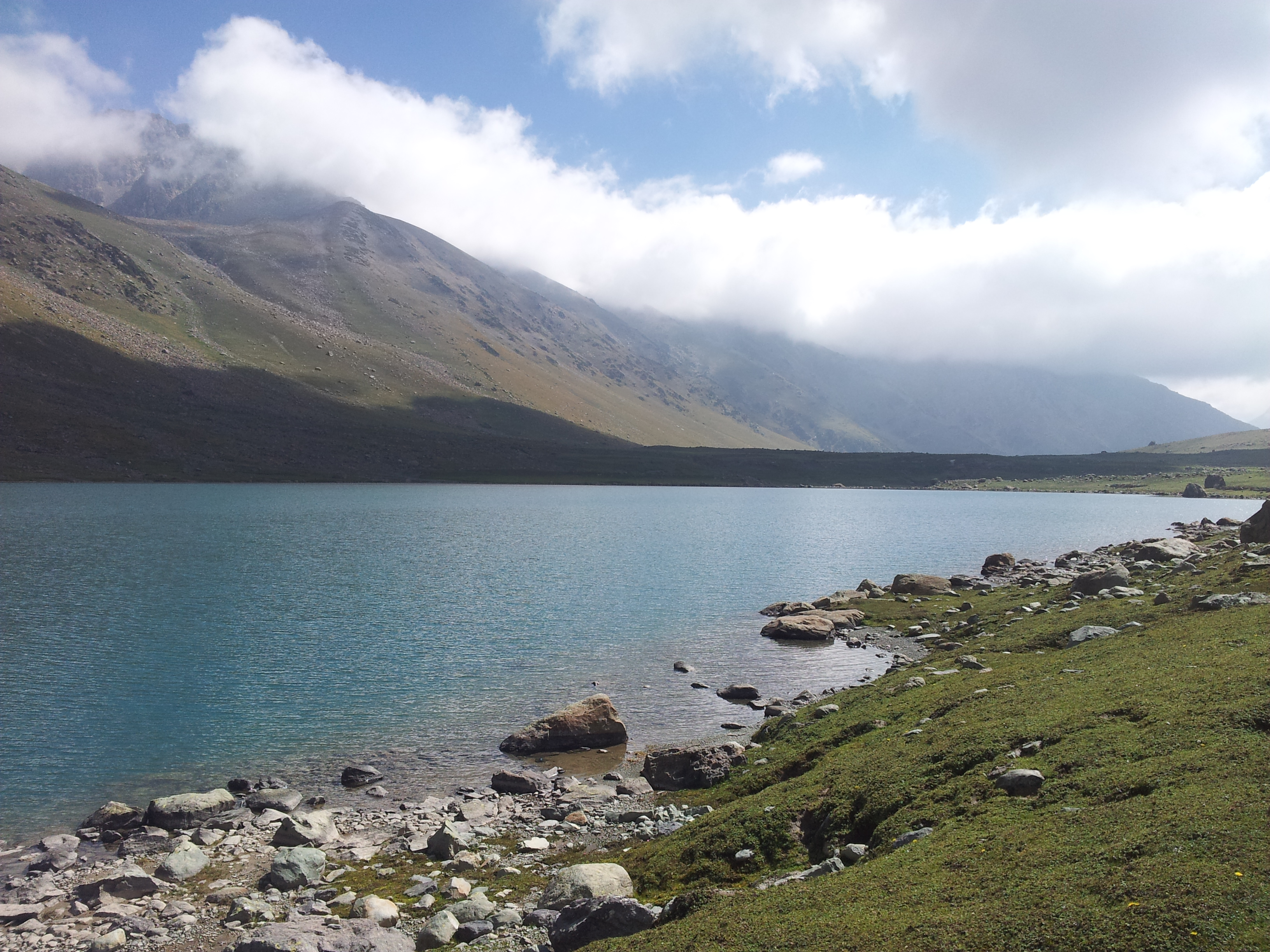

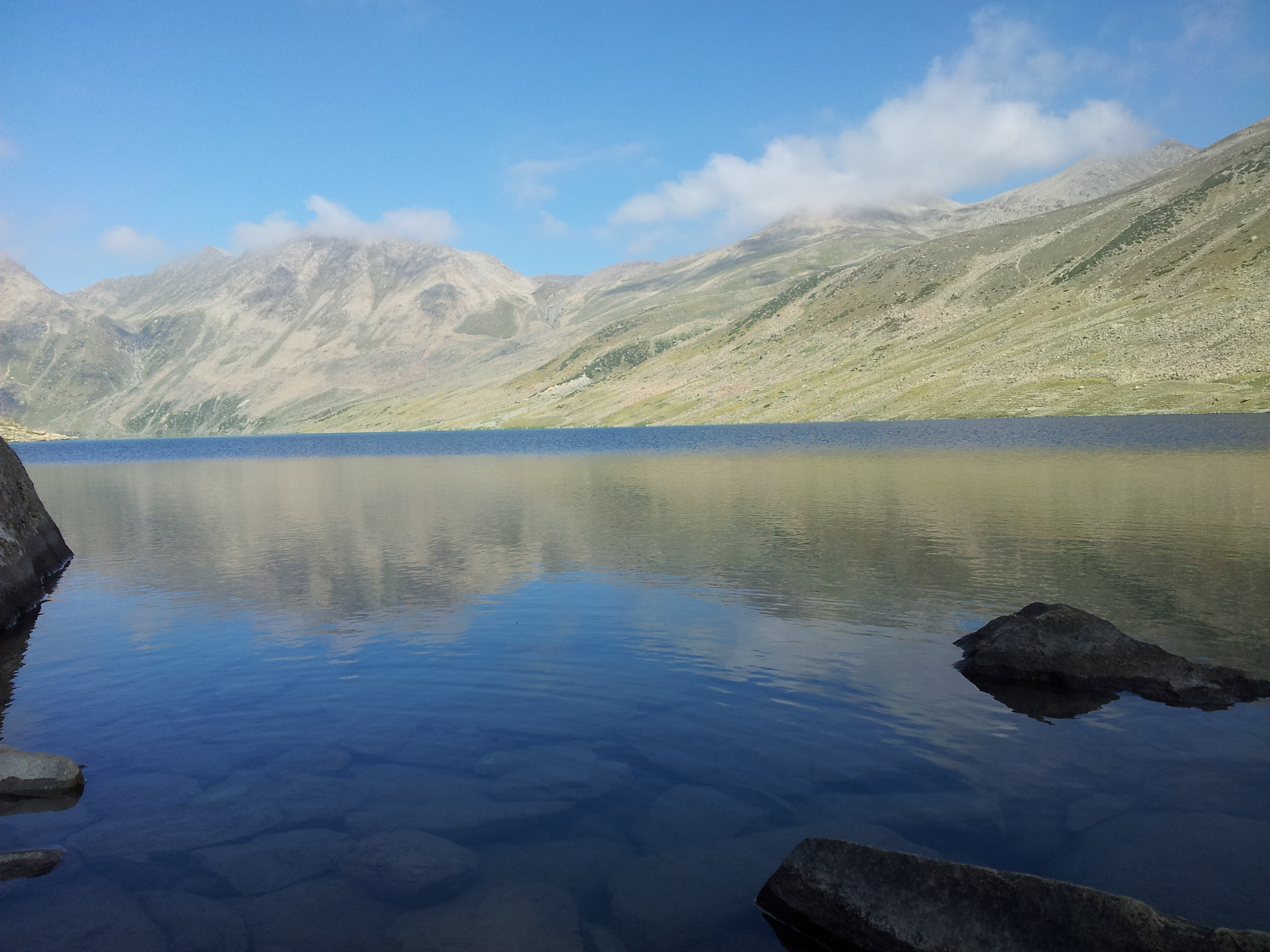

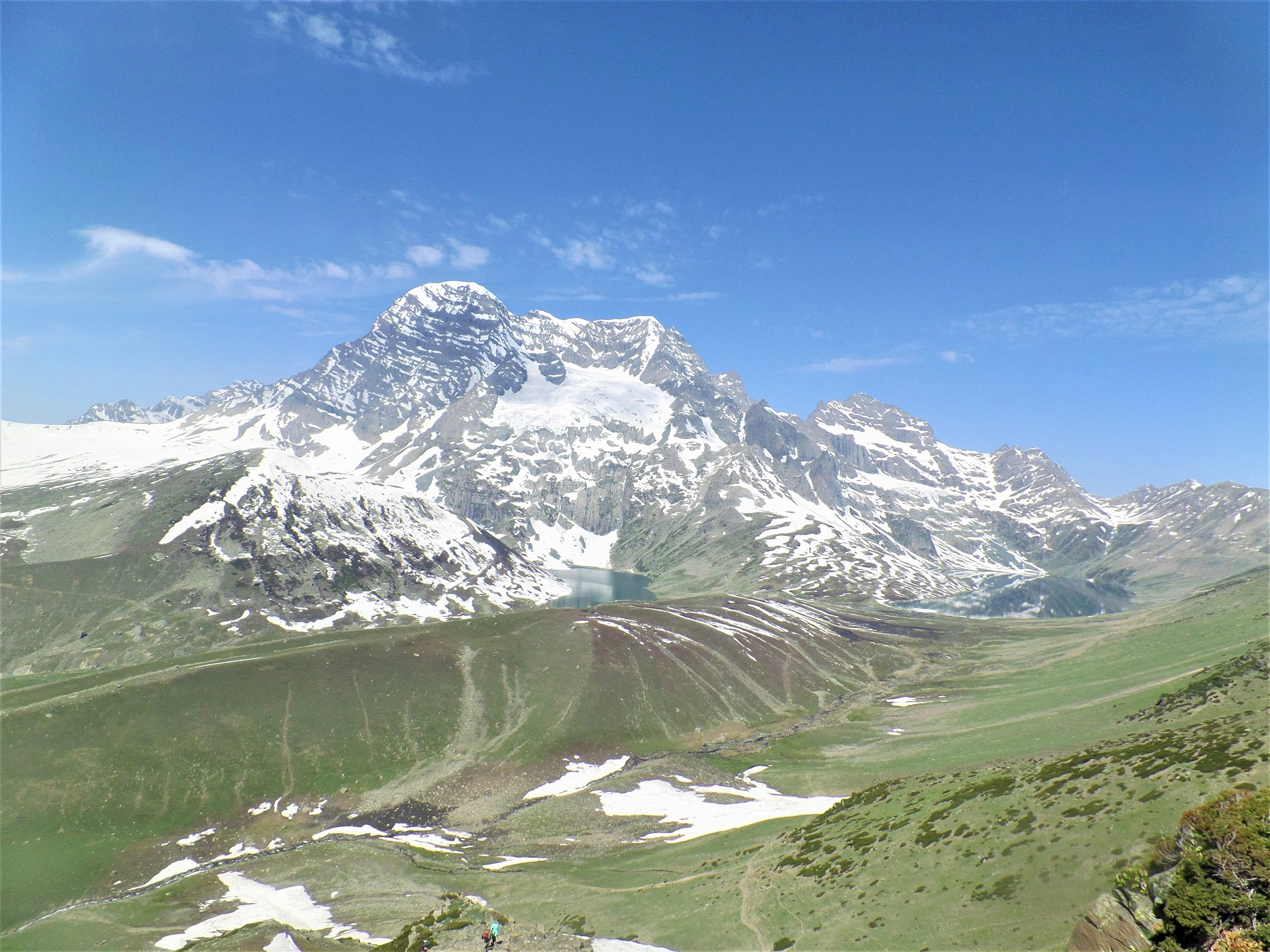

== Bibliography ==
- Ahmed, Rayees; Rawat, Manish; Wani, Gowhar Farooq; Ahmad, Syed Towseef; Jain, Sanjay Kumar; Meraj, Gowhar; Mir, Riyaz Ahmad; Rather, Abid Farooq; Farooq, Majid (24 November 2022). "Glacial Lake Outburst Flood Hazard and Risk Assessment of Gangabal Lake in the Upper Jhelum Basin of Kashmir Himalaya Using Geospatial Technology and Hydrodynamic Modeling". Remote Sensing. 14 (23): 5957. Bibcode:2022RemS...14.5957A. doi:10.3390/rs14235957.
- Inden, Ronald (2008), "Kashmir as Paradise on Earth", in Rao, Aparna (ed.), The Valley of Kashmir: The Making and Unmaking of a Composite Culture, Manohar, pp. 523–562, ISBN 978-81-7304-751-0
