= Sind River =

River in Indian-administered Jammu and Kashmir, tributary of the Jhelum River

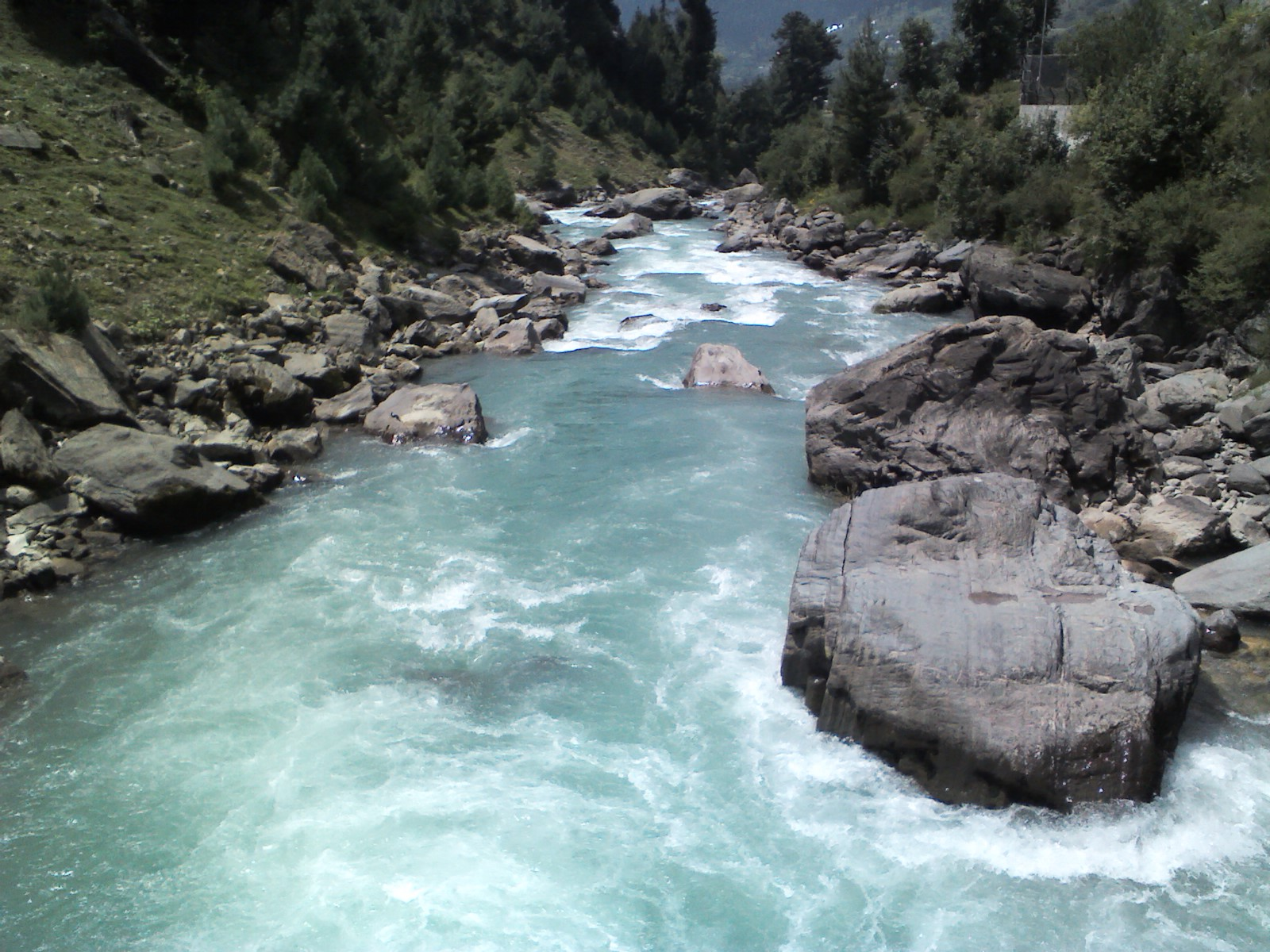
- Sind River

Location
- Country: India
- Union territory: Jammu and Kashmir
- Region: Kashmir Valley
- District: Ganderbal

Physical characteristics
- Source: 34°12′14.860″N 75°35′21.94″E
  - location: Machoi Glacier
  - elevation: 4,800 m (15,700 ft)
- Mouth: 34°11′2.382″N 74°40′36.21″E
  - location: Jhelum River at Shadipora
  - elevation: 1,600 m (5,200 ft)
- Length: 108 km (67 mi)
- Discharge
  - average: 290 m^{3}/s (10,000 cu ft/s)

The Sind River or the Sindh River is a river in the Ganderbal district of the union territory of Jammu and Kashmir, India. It is a major tributary of the Jhelum River and is 108 km (67 miles) long.

== Geography ==
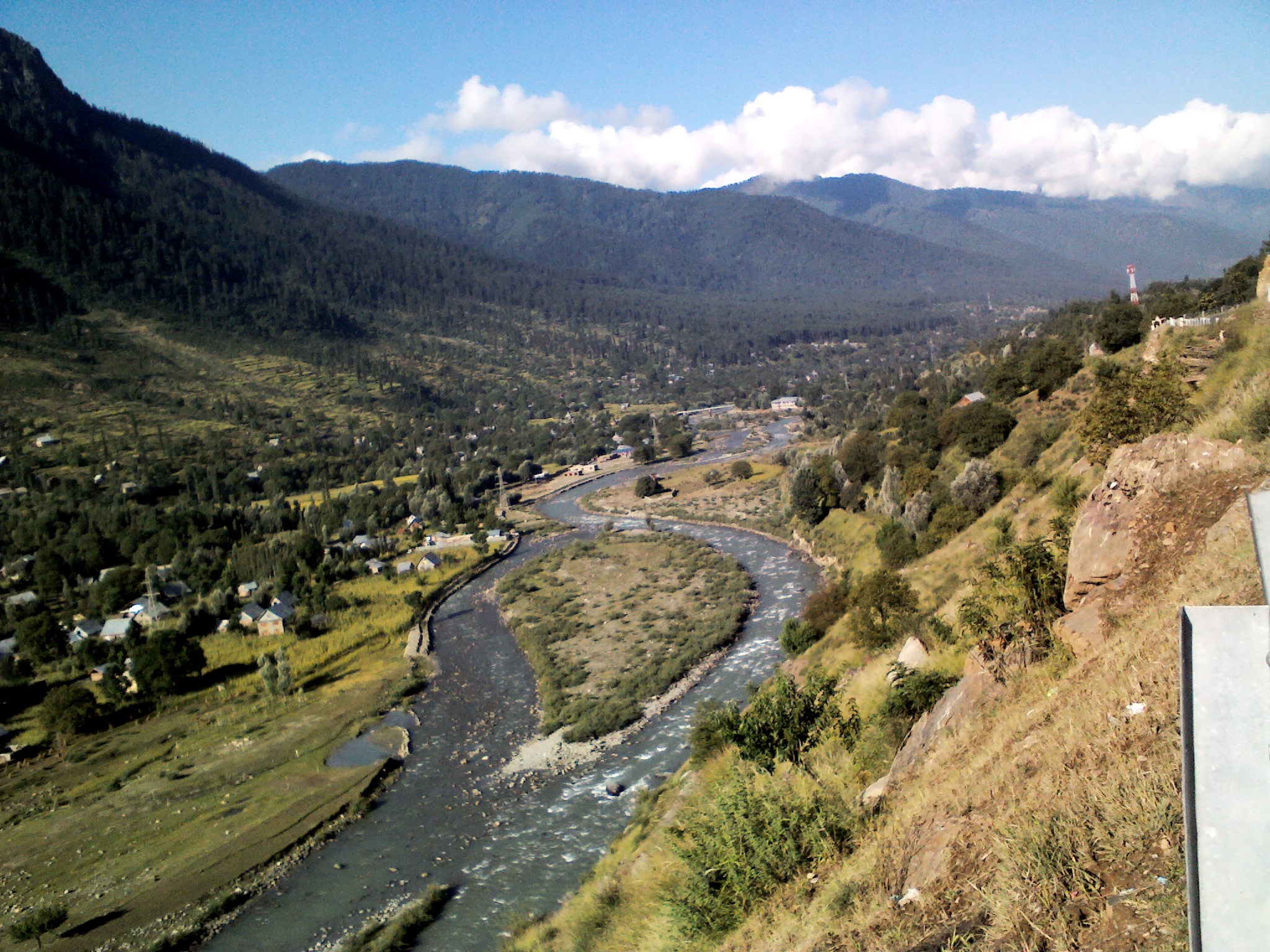
Sind River at Gatribal

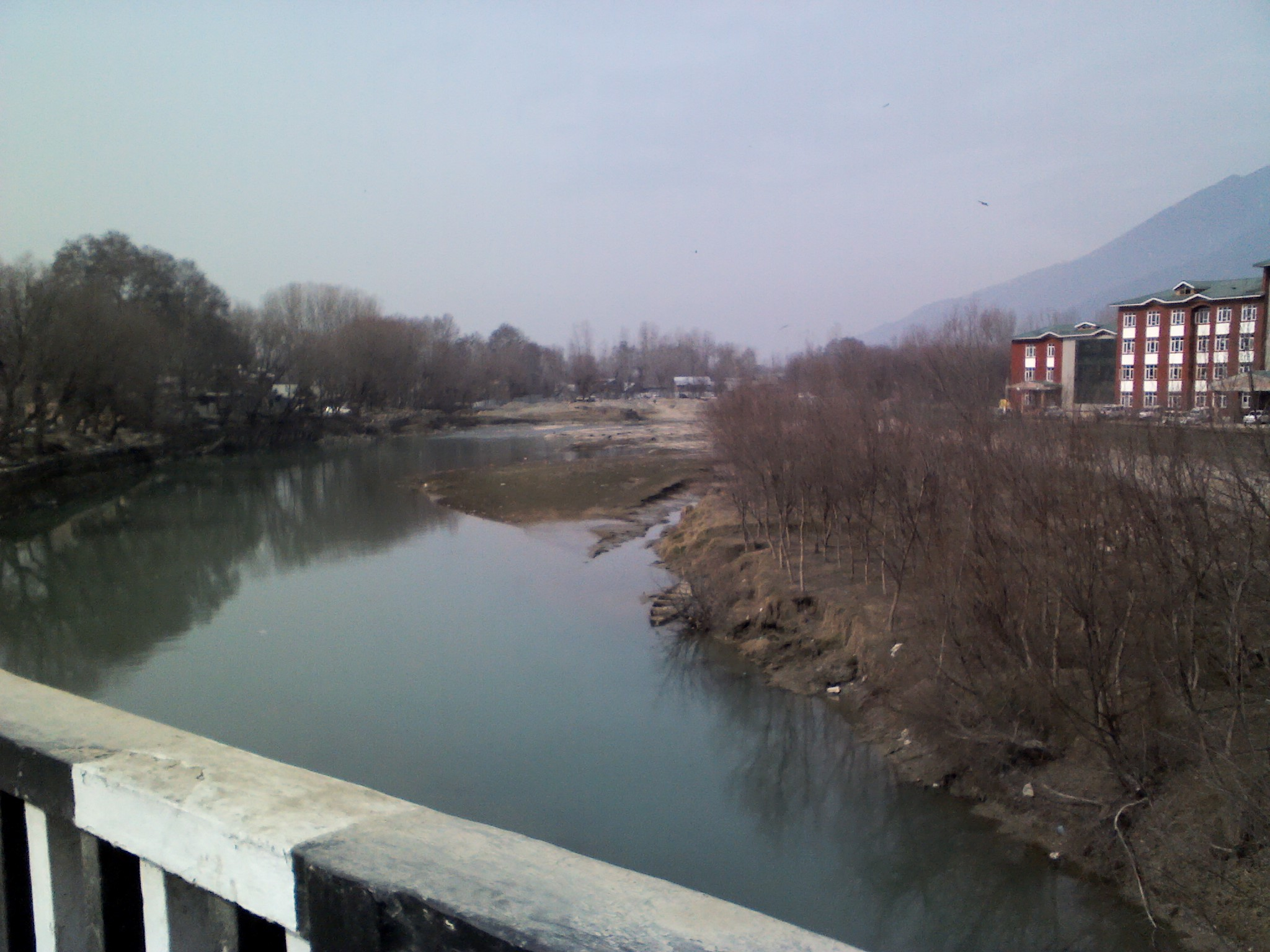
Sind seen from Duderhama Bridge

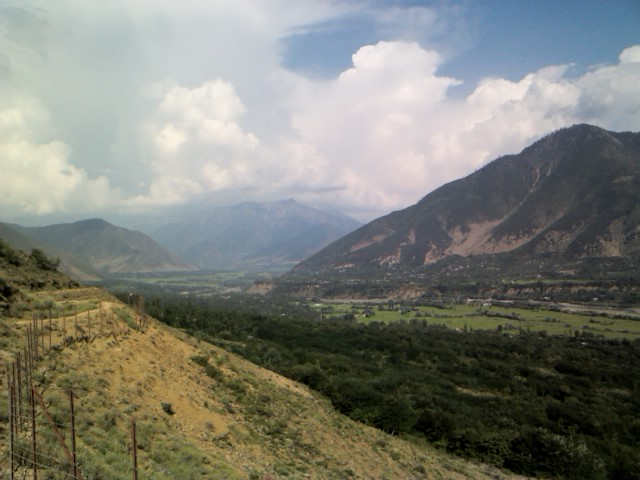
Sind Valley

The Sind River forms the Sind Valley. The source of the river lies in the Machoi Glacier at an elevation of 4,800 m (15,700 ft), east of the Amarnath temple and south of the Zoji La. It flows through Panjtarni (a camping site of Amarnath yatra) southwards up to Domail where it joins a tributary which doubles its flow from the Kolhoi Glacier. It then flows mostly westwards along the NH 1D and is fed by many glacial streams on its way to Ganderbal town. At Kichpora Preng it is fed by the Wangath river which flows down from the Gangabal Lake, which is considered the source of the river per tradition. The major tributaries of the river are: the Amarnath stream, Kolhoi Grar, Shitkadi Nallah, Gund Nallah, Surfraw Nallah and Wangath Nallah.

Surfraw Nallah is a big Nallah which joins the Sind river at Surfraw (Soraf raw). This Nallah is also known for its beauty and fish. The Sind river is navigable from Ganderbal town. It joins the Jhelum River at Shadipora, 17 kilometres northwest of Srinagar. The river also passes through the famous alpine hill station Sonamarg where river rafting tournaments are organised annually by the Tourism Department of Jammu and Kashmir. The Sind River is also the only river in Jammu and Kashmir on which three hydroelectric power plants are functional. The waters of the river are used for irrigation by way of different canals and for domestic use.

== Ecology ==
=== Fishing ===
The Sind River is the natural habitat of trout, and various other fish. The most famous among them are: brown trout, (Salmo trutta) rainbow trout (Oncorynchus mykiss), snow trout (Schizothorax plagiostomus), Shuddgurn and Anyour.

=== Issues ===
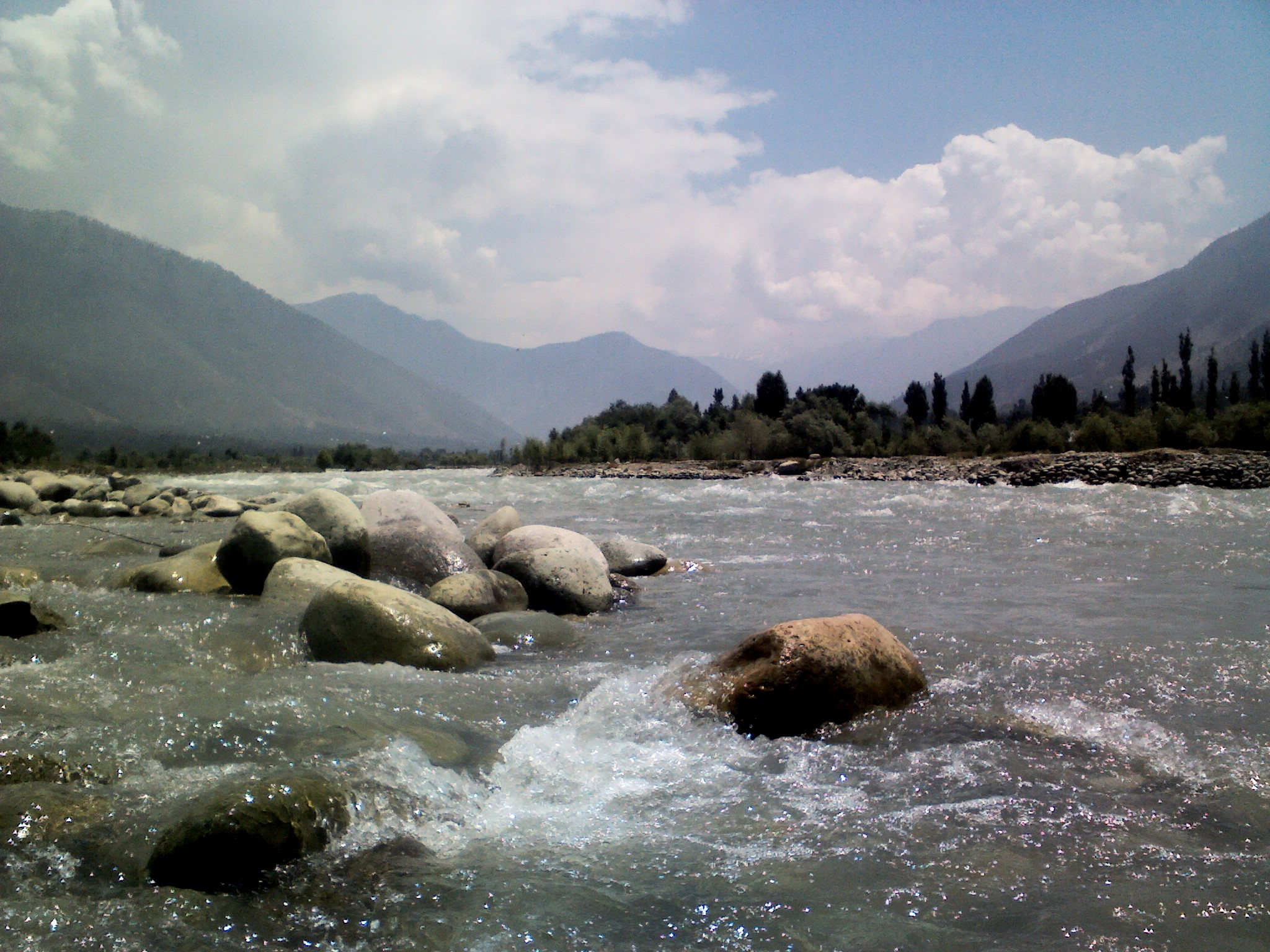
Sind River at Benhama village

Trout and hence trout fishing are at risk along the Sind river. This is for several reasons.

The extraction of sand/bajri by engagement of heavy machines is destroying the natural habitat of trout and other fish. Waste from the use of pesticides, DDT and insecticides by farmers kills many fish every day. The change in topography leads to the destruction of aquatic fauna of the river. In various riverine villages people catch fish through the conventional way of angling and using nets. These methods are replaced today by resorting to unconventional and illegal methods. The most ecologically destructive method is using bleaching powder, procured from officials of the PHE department. Bleaching powder not only kills fish but other aquatic life as well. This process is very common during summers, especially in the Wayil catchment area.

The Fisheries Department and other government agencies have not been able to effectively intervene. Mismanagement of water diversion to power canals is another concern for the survival of fish.

== Infrastructure ==
=== Dams ===
From east to west:

- Upper Sind Hydroelectric Power Project 2nd at Kangan.
- Lower Sind Hydroelectric Power project at Ganderbal.
- Upper Sind Hydroelectric Power project 1st at Sumbal.

=== Water treatment plants ===
- Rangil water treatment plant.

=== Bridges ===
Major bridges in Ganderbal district are:

- Wayil Road Bridge of NH 1D. It is a steel structure bridge for two way vehicular traffic at a time.
- Shithkadi Bridge of NH 1D. It is a steel structure bridge for two way vehicular traffic at a time.
- Hariganiwan Link Road Bridge. It is one of the major steel bridge on River Sind for two way Vehicular traffic at time.
- Ramwari Gund Link Road Bridge is another steel bridge on River Sind & The Construction work is in progress.
- Duderhama Road Bridge, connecting Ganderbal town.
- Gadoora Bridge, connecting District Ganderbal with Srinagar via Umerhaira-Gadoora Rd.
- Ahangar Mohalla Gadoora bridge,(Under Construction), will connect Gadoora and its adjacent areas with Srinagar
- Bamloora-Fatehpura Bridge connecting Saloora, Bamloora and adjacent villages to Fatehpura, Kujjar & District Hospital.
- Syed Kadal at Pati-Bamloora connecting adjacent villages with Kujjar, Fatehpur & Gadoora.
- Gundrehman Bridge connecting villages of Sherpathri with Gadoora & Srinagar.
- Paribal Shallabugh-Takenwari Bridge (under construction) connecting Ganderbal District with Srinagar and Bandipora.
- Gundroshan Bridge connecting Rabitar village with Gundroshan and Pati Shallabugh and Narayan Bagh.
- Nayaran Bagh Bridge connecting Shadipora Towm with District Ganderbal.

== See also ==
- Rivers of Jammu and Kashmir
- Dams and hydroelectric projects on Chenab
- Dams and hydroelectric projects on Jhelum
- Manasbal Lake
