= Ganderbal =

- Town
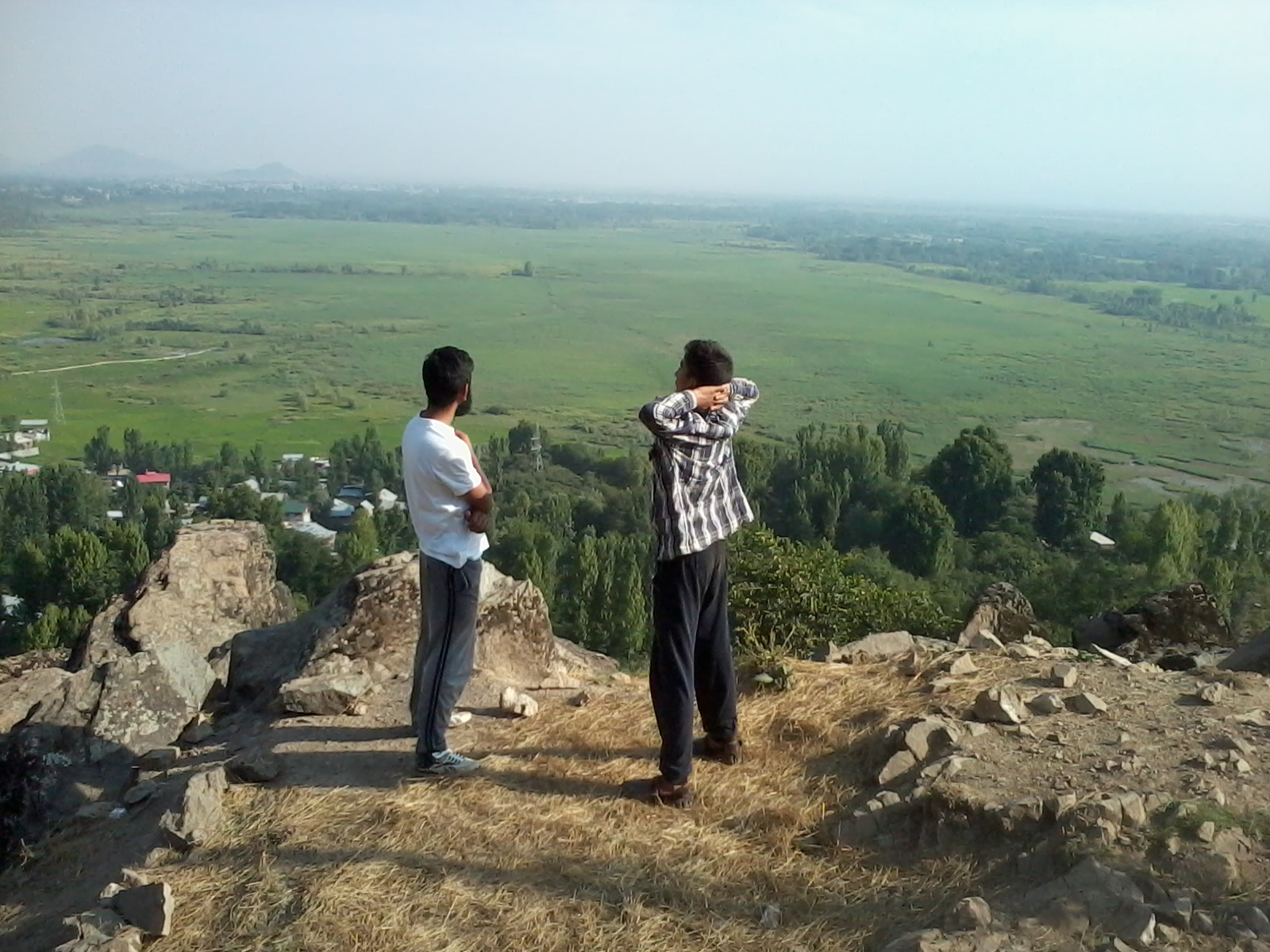
- View of Ganderbal town

- Location in Jammu and Kashmir Ganderbal (India)
- Coordinates: 34.23°N 74.78°E
- Country: India
- Union Territory: Jammu and Kashmir
- District: Ganderbal
- Founded: 2007

Area
  - Total: 1,049 km^{2} (405 sq mi)
- Elevation: 1,619 m (5,312 ft)

Population (2011)
  - Total: 297,446
  - Density: 1,148/km^{2} (2,970/sq mi)
- Demonym(s): Ganderbali, Ganderbalian, Ganderbaluk, Ganderbalia

Languages
  - Official: Kashmiri, Urdu, English
  - Spoken: Kashmiri, Pahari, Gujari, Shina, Balti, Pashto
- Time zone: UTC+5:30 (IST)
- Postal code: 191201
- Vehicle registration: JK16
- Website: ganderbal.nic.in

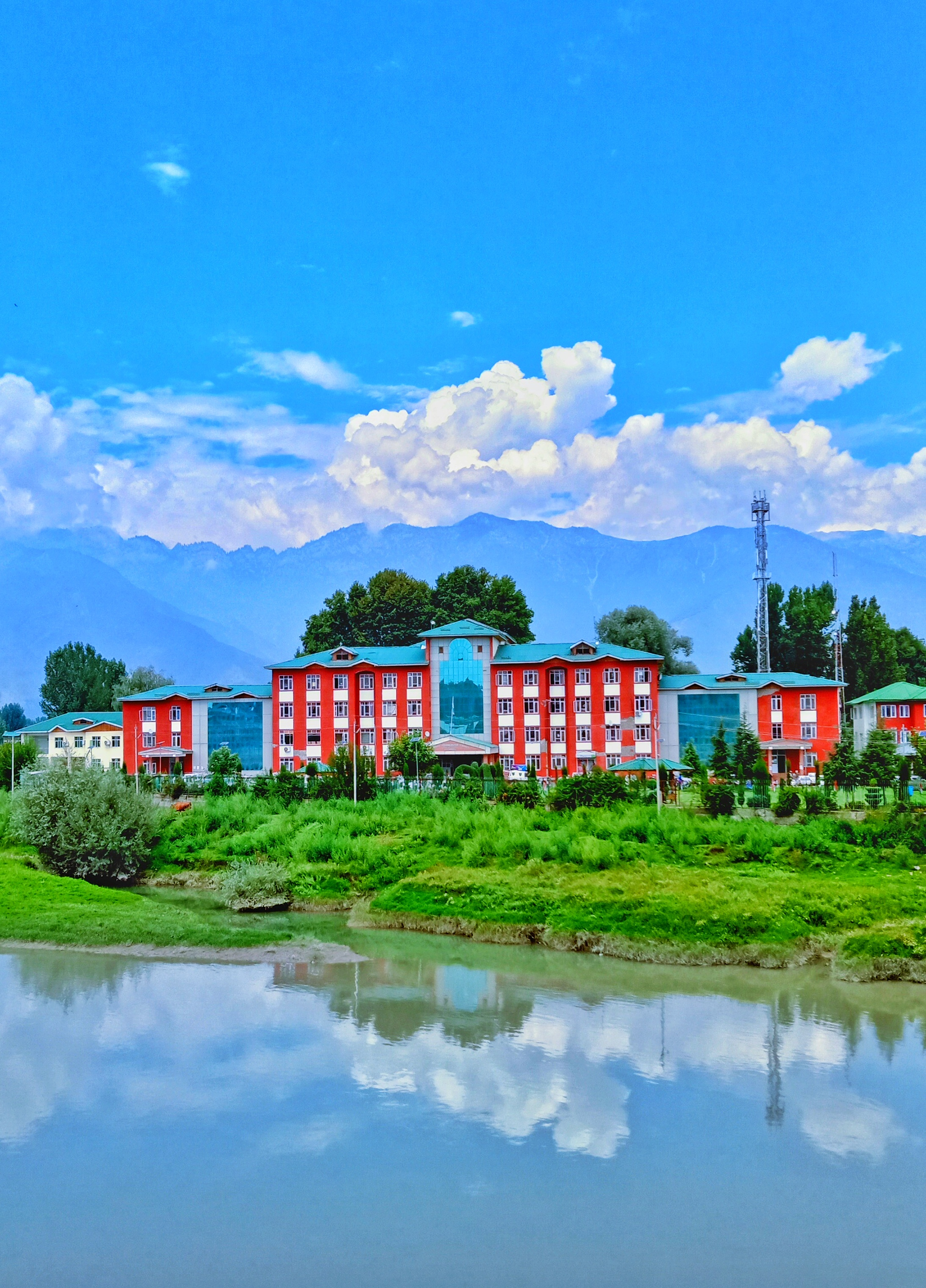
Ganderbal (constituency of the Jammu and Kashmir Legislative Assembly)

Ganderbal (Urdu: [ˈɡaːndəɾbəl], Kashmiri: [ˈɡaːn̪d̪arbal]) is a city and the headquarters of Ganderbal district in the Indian-administered union territory of Jammu and Kashmir, in the disputed Kashmir region. Ganderbal, known for its natural environment and scenery, has tourist sites like Sonamarg and Manasbal Lake, and the annual Amarnath Yatra pilgrimage also traverses through Ganderbal district.

== Geography ==
Ganderbal is located at 34.23°N 74.78°E. It has an average elevation of 1,619 metres (5,312 feet) above sea level. It is bordered by the Srinagar district in the south, Bandipore to the north, Kargil in the northeast, Anantnag to the southeast and Baramulla to the southwest.

Ganderbal is divided into two divisions viz. Kangan and Ganderbal. Ganderbal division is mainly flat lands while as Kangan is Side valley of larger Kashmir Valley. Through Kangan Valley there flows Sind River known for river rafting separates Greater Himalayas from north eastern part of Zabarwan Range. Sonamarg lies in this Kangan valley. On the Greater Himalayan side of Ganderbal there lies a famous Harmukh mountain from which the worlds second highest mountain K2 was first discovered. Ganderbal is also known for its high alpine lakes viz. Gangbal Lake, Nundkol Lake Gadsar Vishansar Krishansar Lake Satsar (small seven lakes) and numerous unnamed lakes. Through these lakes runs a summer famous KGL trek. On lower parts Sind river before entering into Jhelum River lies a Ramsar site Shallabugh Wetland.

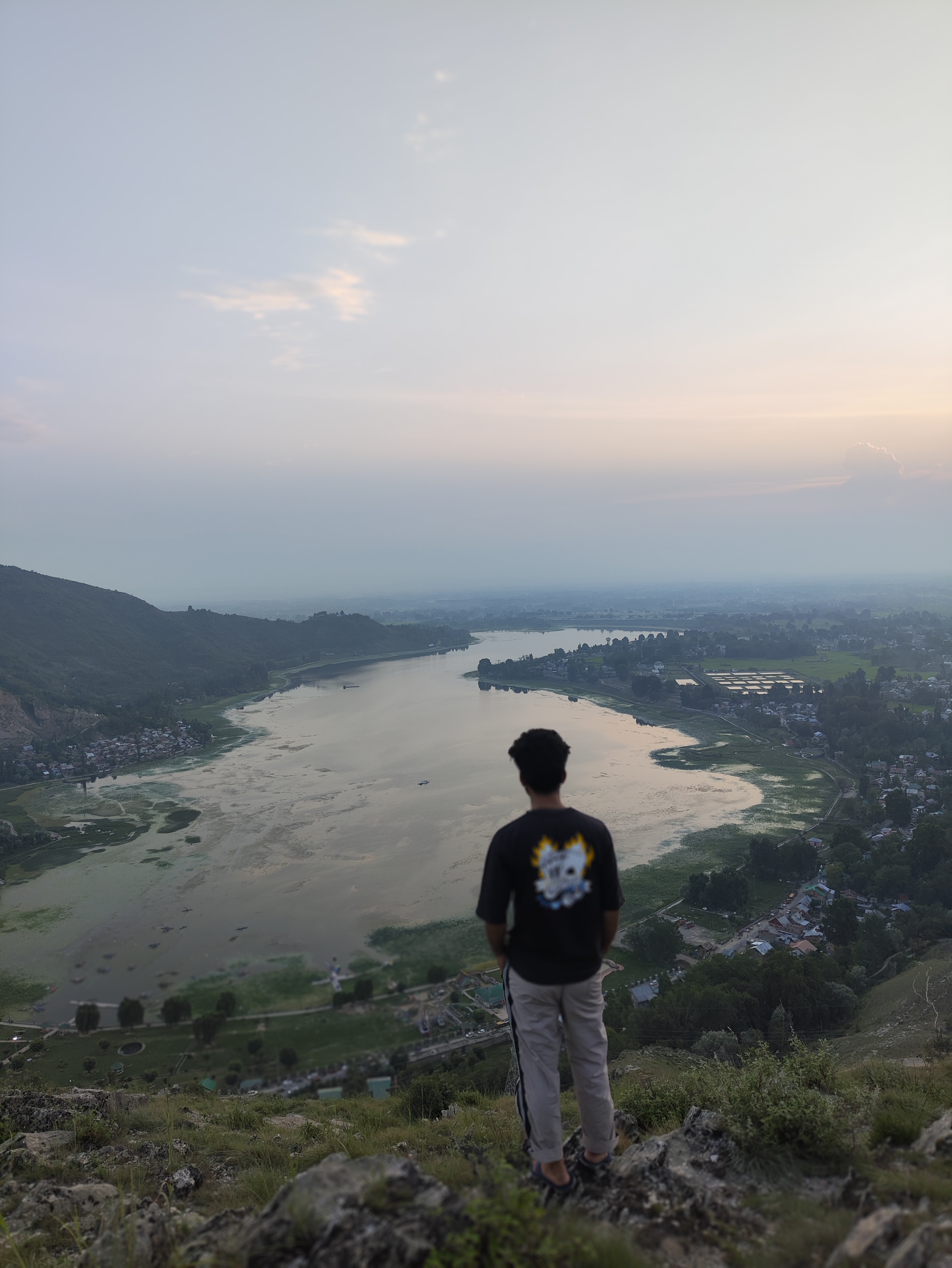
Manasbal lake from the top of a mountain.

Manasbal Lake a popular tourist resort lies on the northern part of Ganderbal, which is known for its appearance of bluish colour. Ganderbal also share Anchar Lake with Srinagar, which is known for its Nadru (Lotus Root).

== Demographics ==
Religion in Ganderbal Town (2011)
1. Islam (98.2%)
2. Hinduism (1.35%)
3. Sikhism (0.15%)
4. Christianity (0.14%)
5. Buddhism (0.01%)
6. Not Stated (0.13%)

As of 2011 India census, Ganderbal had a population of 297446. Males constitute 53.36% of the population and females 46.64%. Ganderbal has an average literacy rate of 58.04%, lower than the national average of 74.04%: male literacy is 68.85%, and female literacy is 45.71%. In Ganderbal, 17.01% of the population is under 6 years of age.

== Politics ==
The Municipal Committee Ganderbal is an Urban Local Body with 17 elected members. Its last elections took place on 16 October 2018.

Keys: BJP (2) INC (2) Independent (13)

#	Name	Municipal Ward	Reservation Status	Party
1	Samia Ahad	Beehama Nagripora	Women Open	Independent
2	Abdul Rashid Rather	Beehama Wahid Sahib	Open	Independent
3	Jeelani Ahmed Mir	Ganderbal A	Open	BJP
4	Haleema	Ganderbal B	Women Open	Independent
5	Showkat Ahmad Mir	Arampora A	Open	Independent
6	Altaf Ahmad Lone	Arampora B	Open	Independent
7	Mehak Shah	Duderhama Gousia	Women Open	INC
8	Hilal Ahmad Tantray	Duderhama	Open	Independent
9	Nazir Ahmad Ganaie	Fathipora A	Open	Independent
10	Rashida Bano	Fatehpora B	Women Open	Independent
11	Ghulam Hassan Dar	Gangerhama A	Open	Independent
12	Bashir Ahmad Koul	Gangerhama B	Open	Independent
13	Nabla	Wanipora	Women Open	Independent
14	Sajjad Ahmad	Bamloora	Open	INC
15	Lateef Ahmad	Saloora A	Open	BJP
16	Sara	Saloora B	Women Open	Independent
17	Abdul Majid	Saloora C	Open	Independent

== Economy ==
=== Education ===
- Universities
  - Central University of Kashmir at Tulmulla.
  - Sher-e-Kashmir University of Agricultural Sciences and Technology of Kashmir's 3 facilities are located in Ganderbal:
  - Fisheries at Rangil,
  - Forestry at Benhama,
  - Veterinary Sciences and Animal Husbandry at Shuhama).
- Degree colleges
  - Royal Institute of Paramedical Sciences, Darend,
  - Government Degree College, Ganderbal,
  - Government College of Engineering and Technology, Safapora,
  - Government College of Physical Education, Gadoora,
  - Government Degree College, Kangan,
  - Government Unani Medical College/Hospital, Nawabagh,
  - Qamariya College of Education and Training, Badampora,
  - Physical Education College, Gadoora, the only physical education college in J&K.
- Vocational education
  - Government Polytechnic College, Hathbura,
  - ITI, Ganderbal,
  - ITI, Kangan,
- Schools
  - Sainik School, Manasbal,
  - Jawahar Navodaya Vidyalaya, Hathbura.

=== Power Generation ===
The Sind River, a major tributary to the Jhelum River, has the following dams which are used for generating hydroelectricity and regulating water for the irrigation:

- Lower Sindh Hydroelectric Power Project Ganderbal
- Upper Sindh Stage-I Hydroelectric Power Project at Kangan
- Upper Sindh Stage-II Hydroelectric Power Project at Sumbal.

Besides, Rangil Water Treatment Plant purifies the water of the Sind River for drinking by Srinagar city.

=== Tourism ===
Water rafting tournaments are being organised at the tourist destination of Sonamarg every year, to boost the tourism industry of Kashmir Valley. Besides Manasbal lake, Gangabal Lake at the foot of Mount Haramukh is one of the destinations of foreign tourists visiting the valley. Vaishnosar Lake and Gadsar Lake are situated north of Sonamarg.

== Transport ==
=== Road ===
Ganderbal is well-connected by road to other places in Jammu and Kashmir and India by the NH 1.

=== Rail ===
Ganderbal is not connected with railways. The nearest railway station is Srinagar railway station located at a distance of 31 kilometres.

=== Air ===
The nearest airport is Sheikh ul-Alam International Airport located at a distance of 30 kilometres.

=== Water ===
Manasbal lake, Anchar Lake Lower area of Sind River are navigable in Shikaras. Shikaras in Sind River are used as sand collection, fishing and to cross river in some remote area. Water navigation is essential in those low-lying areas.

== See also ==
- Babawayil
