= Brari Nambal =

Lake in Jammu and Kashmir, India

- Bab Demb
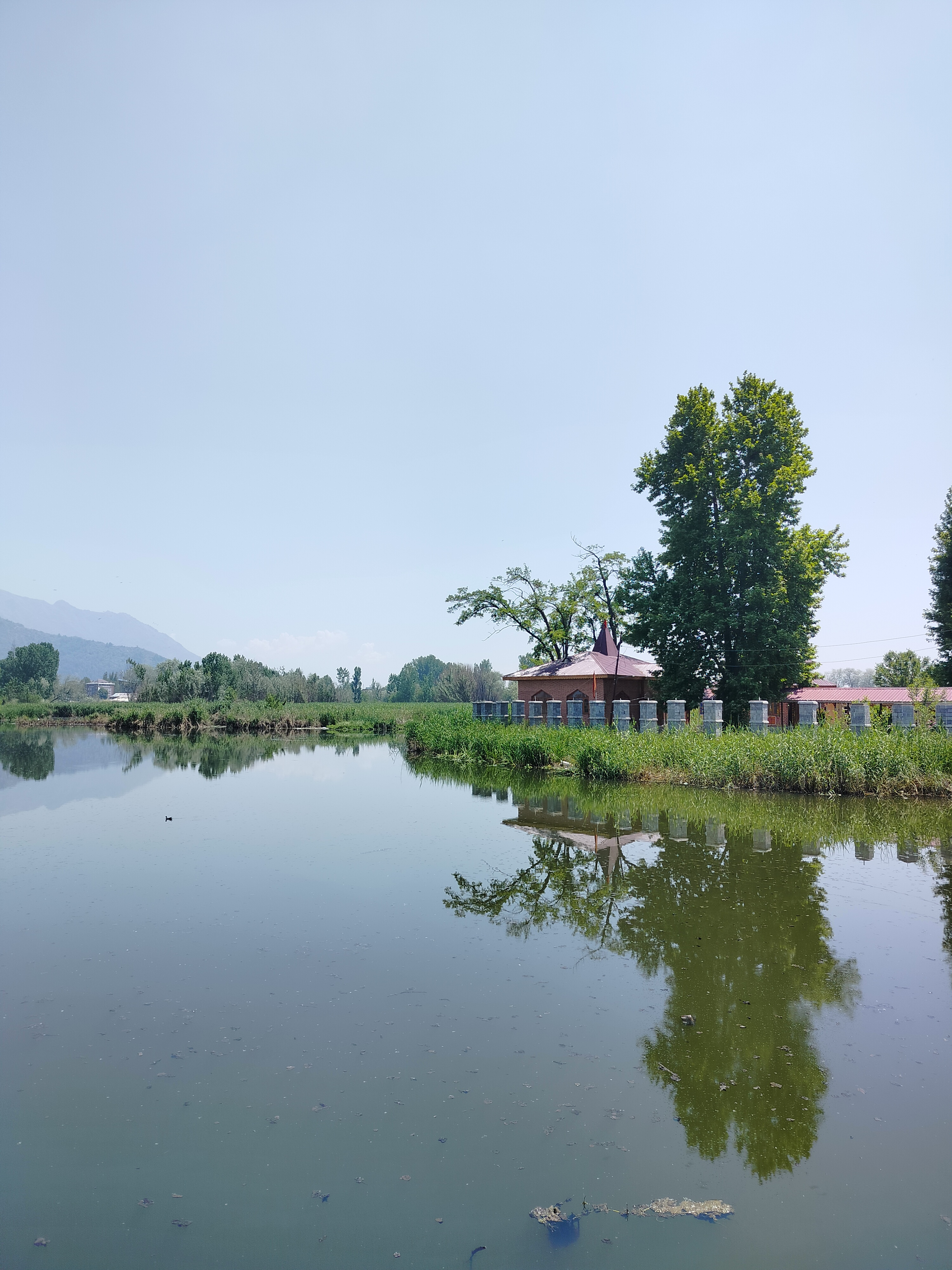
- Picture of Brari Nambal along with Mangleshwar Hindu temple.

- Location of the lake in Jammu and Kashmir Brari Nambal (India)
- Location: Srinagar, Jammu and Kashmir, India
- Coordinates: 34°05′12.88″N 74°48′50″E
- Type: lake

Brari Nambal, commonly known as Bab Demb or Baba Demb, is a small freshwater lake located in Srinagar, Jammu and Kashmir, India. It is connected to the Dal Lake via a channel and is therefore sometimes referred to as a lagoon of the Dal Lake. Until the 1970s, it had a primary outflow in the form of the Mar Canal, but after this was landfilled, it began to deteriorate badly. It is currently in an extremely poor condition, but conservationists are attempting to revive it..
