= Nallah Mar =

Canal in Srinagar, India

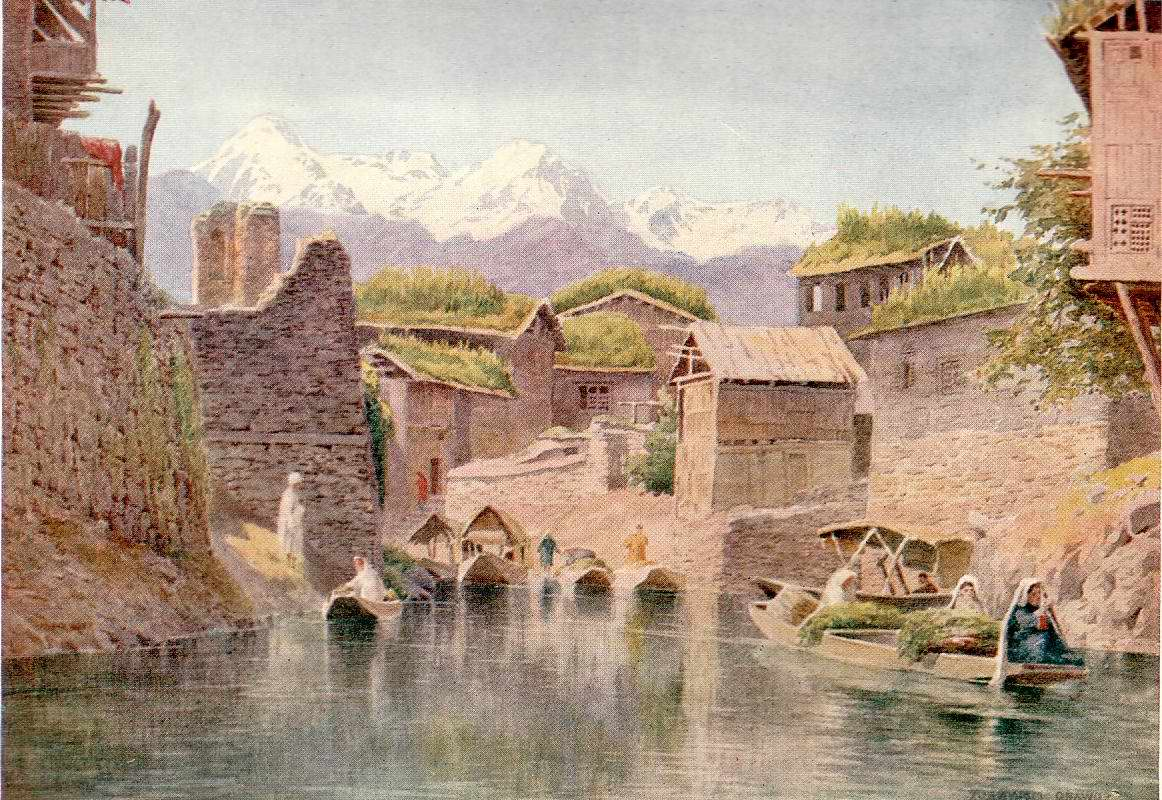
- Nallah Mar Canal in Srinagar, India

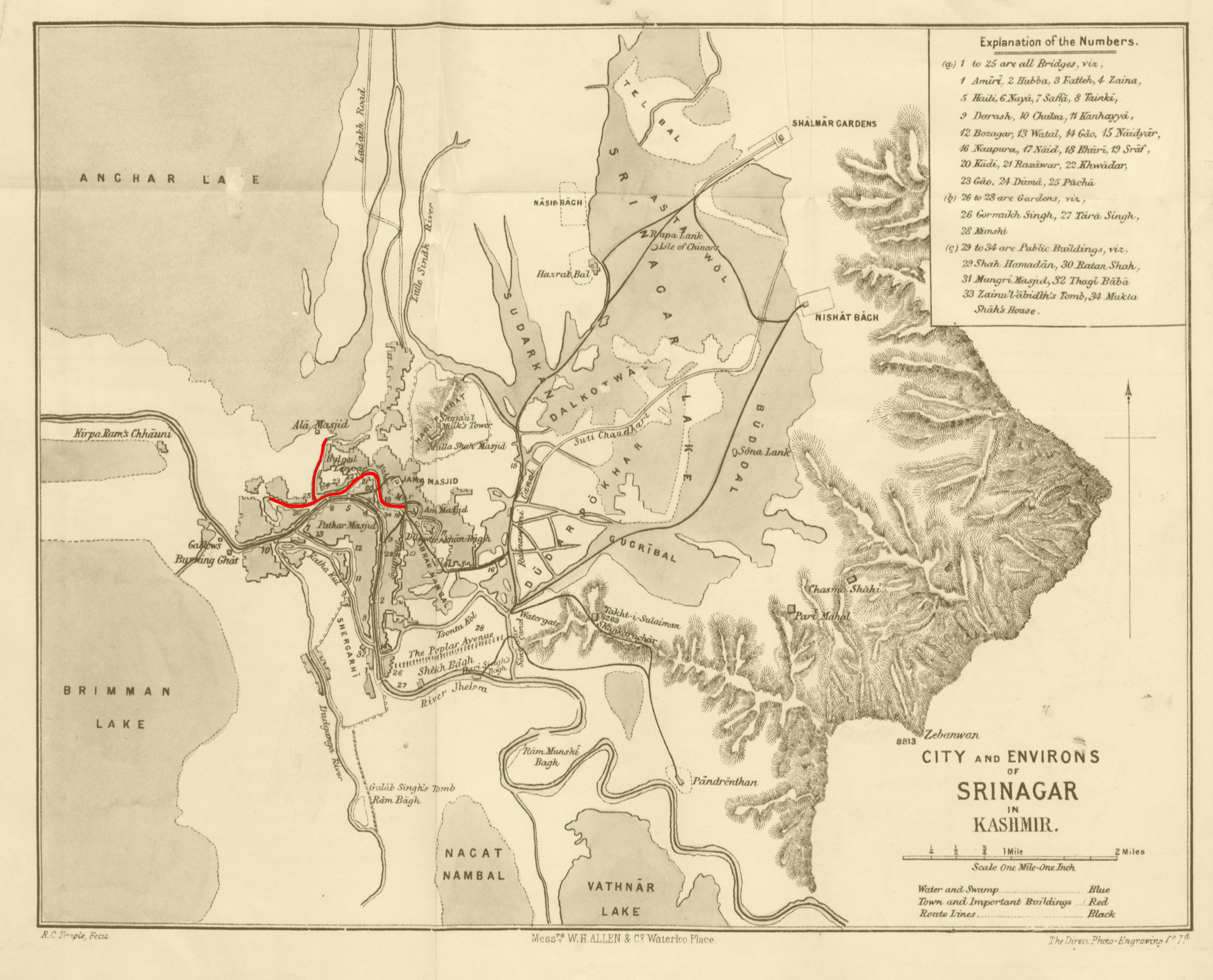
- Nallah Mar highlighted in red
- Location: Srinagar, J&K, India

Specifications
- Status: Landfilled and replaced by the Nallah Mar Road

History
- Date of first use: c. 15th century
- Date closed: 1970s

Geography
- Start point: Brari Nambal
- End point: Khushal Sar
- Connects to: Khushal Sar

Nallah Mar or Mar Canal (also known as Mar Kol) was a navigational canal running through the old city of Srinagar in the Indian union territory of Jammu and Kashmir. It connected the Brari Nambal lagoon to the Khushal Sar lake and thus provided navigability between the Dal and Aanchar lakes. It was filled up and converted to a road in the 1970s. Once regarded as the lifeline of the city, it served vital functions in transportation, drainage, and urban life by linking Brari Nambal with Khushal Sar and other water bodies. Lined with stonework and arched bridges, its banks supported a bustling network of workshops, ghats, and stilted homes. However, in the 1970s, the canal was filled to create a road through the old city, an act now widely viewed as an ecological misstep that disrupted Srinagar’s water system and contributed to increased flood risks.

== History ==
The canal was built during the reign of Sultan Zain-ul-Abidin of the Shah Mir dynasty (popularly known in Kashmir as 'Budshah'). It was considered as a lifeline of the city even up to the early part of the 20th century. However, with the arrival of motor transport, it gradually lost its sheen. As such, it was filled up to pave way for a road through the old city. The filling up of the canal is considered an ecological disaster as it led to the choking up of Brari Nambal and in turn affected the entire water system of the city. In the 1970s, Nallah Mar was filled in and converted into a road to accommodate increasing road traffic, reflecting urban infrastructure priorities of the time but resulting in loss of drainage function and worsened flood risk. The culverting of the canal severely disrupted the hydrology of Brari Nambal and the Dal-Anchar waterway system.

== Architecture ==
Nallah Mar, also known as Mar Kol, was a historic canal originally constructed to connect Brari Nambal lagoon with Khushal Sar and other water bodies serving both navigation and flood control purposes. It was lined with flattened stones and brick paving and featured numerous arched bridges such as Nowpora, Bohri, Saraf, Qadi, and Rajouri Kadals over its winding course through Old Srinagar. The canal's banks were once lined with workshops and waterfront houses set on stilts, with ghats where locals bathed, washed, and socialized creating a vibrant urban fabric along the water.

== Maps ==
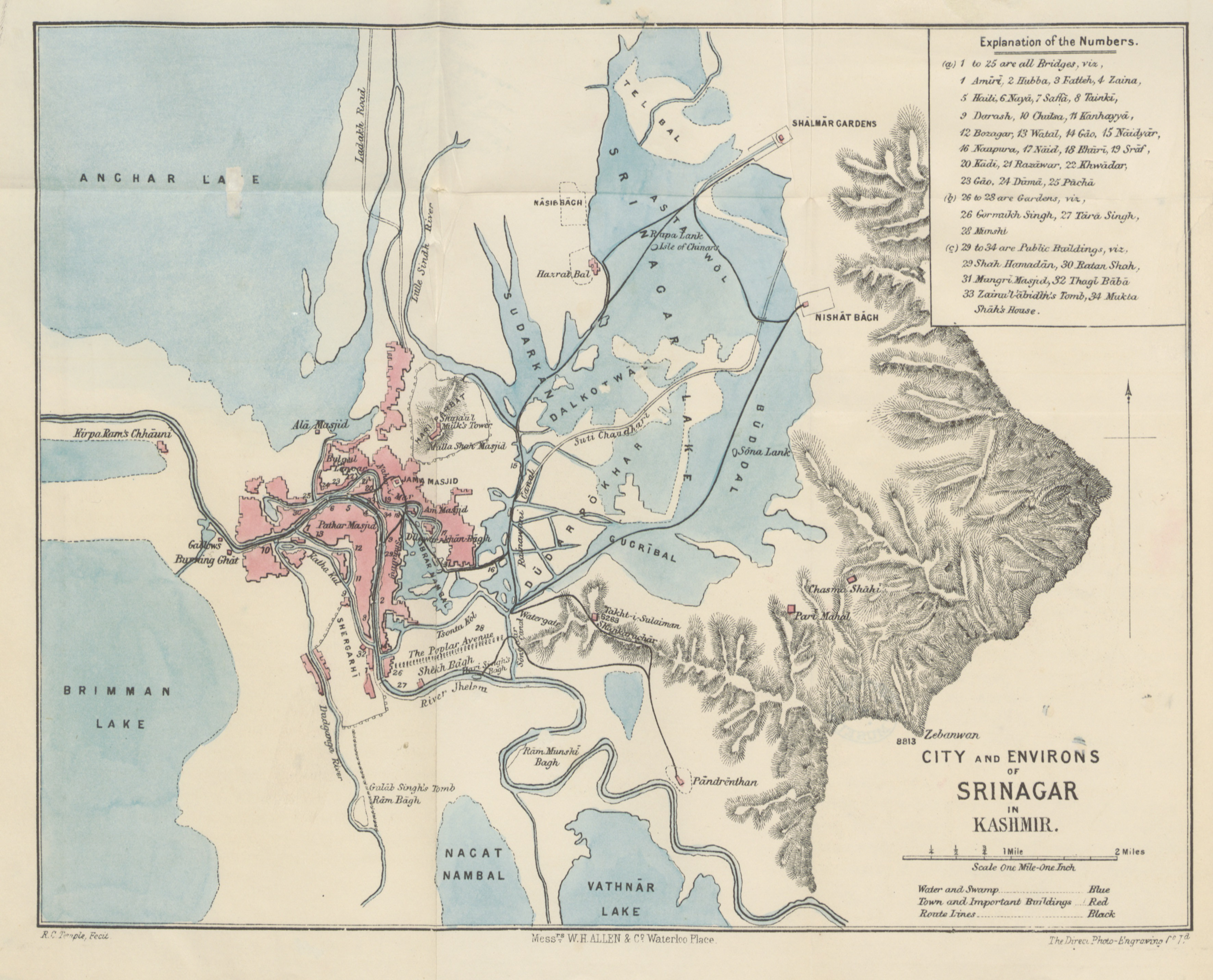
1887

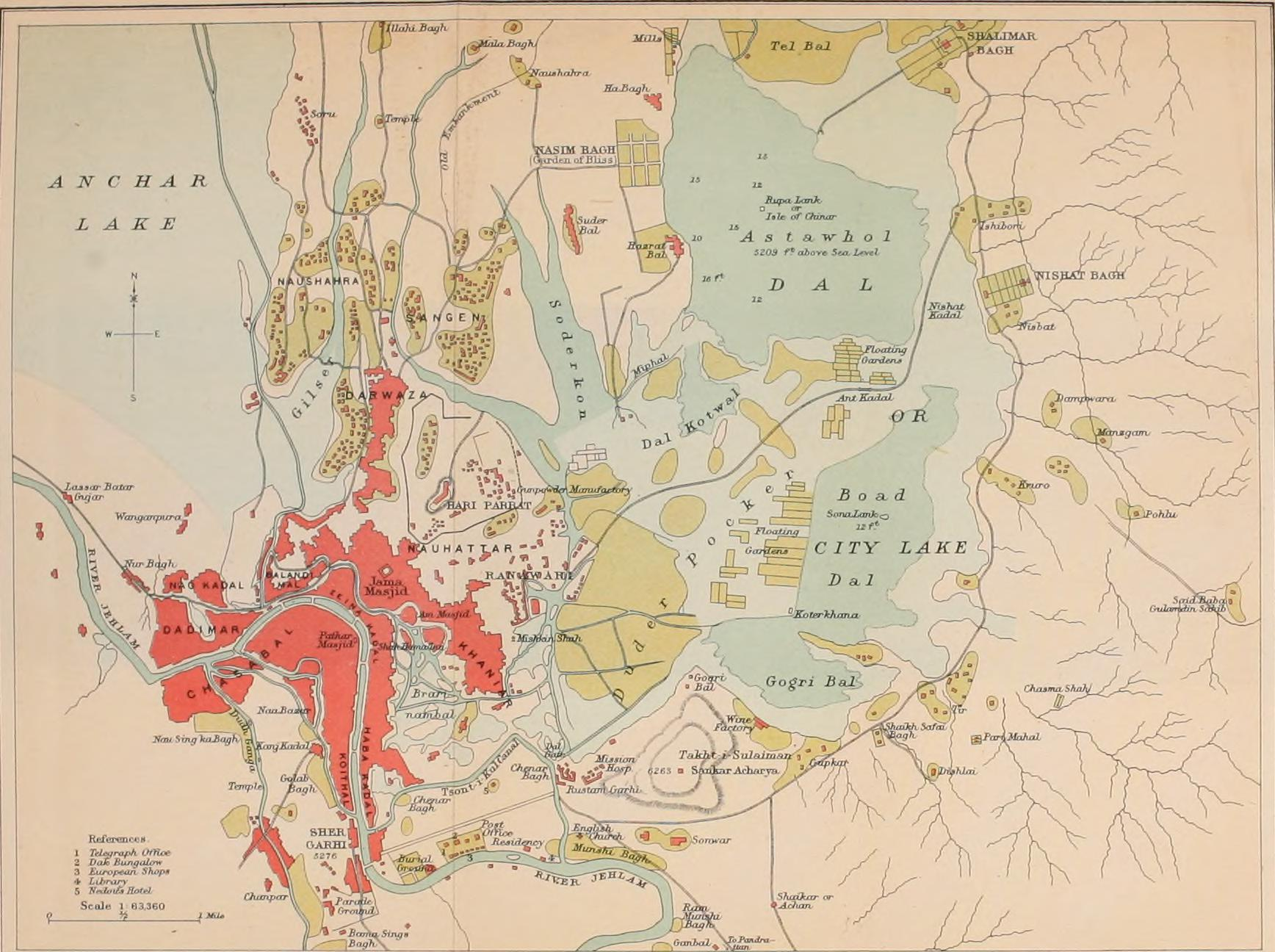
1911
