= Anchar Lake =

Lake in Srinagar, India

- Location within India
- Location: Soura, J&K, India
- Coordinates: 34°09′N 74°47′E
- Type: lake

Anchar Lake (Urdu pronunciation: [ɑ̃ːt͡ʃɑːr]; Kashmiri pronunciation: [ãːt͡ʃaːr]); lit. 'Pickle') is a lake located in Soura in the Srinagar district of the Indian-administered Jammu and Kashmir.

Situated close to Ganderbal, the lake is connected with the famous Dal Lake via a channel, "Amir Khan Nallah," which passes through Gilsar and Khushal Sar. The lake is in a highly deteriorated condition. In case of flooding, the excessive water of the Dal is diverted here.

The Shallabugh Wetland is fed by water from the Sind River and Anchar Lake.

== Deterioration ==
Once a popular tourist destination, as tourists on shikaras and houseboats used to travel here from Dal Lake, over the years it has deteriorated owing to pollution, large-scale encroachment, and illegal constructions in its surroundings. In the 1990s, when the Nallah Mar was covered to build the Mearplan highway around the western side of Dal, six-foot pipes were laid under the new road to allow Dal to continue to drain into the Anchar lake system, however, the pipes soon clogged due to waste and debris.

Like the Dal Lake and Wular Lake, it is home to the Hanji community, which lives near the lake in an area called Anchar among the locals.
