= Dal Lake =

Lake in Srinagar, India

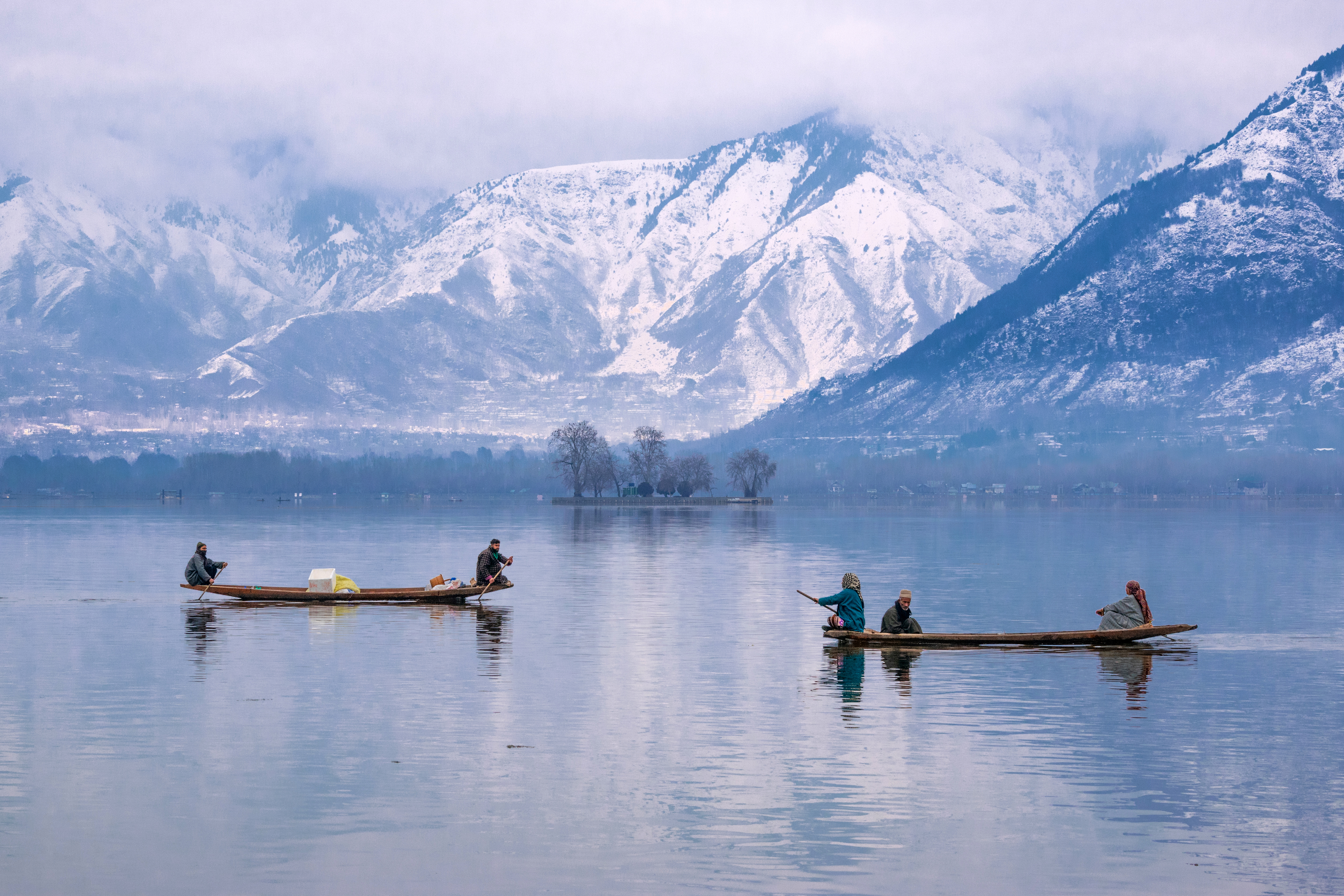
- View of Dal Lake and Char Chinar

- Location within Jammu and Kashmir Location within India
- Location: Srinagar, Jammu and Kashmir, India
- Coordinates: 34.12°N 74.87°E
- Lake type: Warm monomictic
- Primary inflows: Inflow Channel Telbal Nallah from Marsar lake −291.9 million cubic metres
- Primary outflows: Regulated, two channels (Dal Gate and Nalla Amir) – 275.6 million cubic metres
- Catchment area: 316 km^{2} (122 mi^{2})
- Basin countries: India
- Max. length: 7.44 km (4.62 mi)
- Max. width: 3.5 km (2.2 mi)
- Surface area: 18–22 km^{2} (6.9–8.5 mi^{2})
- Average depth: 1.42 m (4.7 ft)
- Max. depth: 6 m (20 ft)
- Water volume: 983×10^{6} m^{3} (34.7×10^{9} cu ft)
- Residence time: 22.16 days
- Shore length^{1}: 15.5 km (9.6 mi)
- Surface elevation: 1,583 m (5,194 ft)
- Frozen: During severe winter
- Islands: Char Chinar and Son Lank
- Settlements: Hazratbal, Srinagar
- ^{1} Shore length is not a well-defined measure.

Dal (Urdu pronunciation: [ɖəl] ; Kashmiri pronunciation: [ɖal]) is a freshwater lake in Srinagar, the summer capital of Jammu and Kashmir in Indian-administered Kashmir. It is an urban lake, the second largest lake in Jammu and Kashmir, and the most visited place in Srinagar by tourists and locals. It is integral to tourism and recreation in the Kashmir Valley and is variously known as the "Lake of Flowers", "Jewel in the crown of Kashmir" or "Srinagar's Jewel". The lake is also an important source for commercial operations in fishing and water plant harvesting.

The shore line of the lake, about 15.5 kilometres (9.6 mi), is encompassed by a boulevard lined with Mughal era gardens, parks, houseboats and hotels. Scenic views of the lake can be witnessed from the shore line Mughal gardens, such as Shalimar Bagh and Nishat Bagh built during the reign of Mughal Emperor Jahangir, and from houseboats cruising along the lake in the colourful shikaras. During the winter season, the temperature can sometimes reach as low as −11 °C (12 °F), freezing the lake.

The lake covers an area of 18 square kilometres (6.9 mi^{2}) and is part of a natural wetland which covers 21.1 square kilometres (8.1 mi^{2}), including its floating gardens. The floating gardens, known as "Raad" in Kashmiri, blossom with lotus flowers during July and August. The wetland is divided by causeways into four basins; Gagribal, Lokut Dal, Bod Dal and Nigeen (although Nigeen is also considered as an independent lake). Lokut Dal and Bod Dal each have an island in the centre, known as Rupa Lank (or Char Chinari) and Sona Lank respectively.

At present, the Dal and the Mughal gardens on its periphery are undergoing intensive restoration measures to fully address the serious eutrophication problems experienced by the lake. Massive investments of approximately US$275 million (₹ 11 billion) are being made by the Government of India to restore the lake to its original splendour.

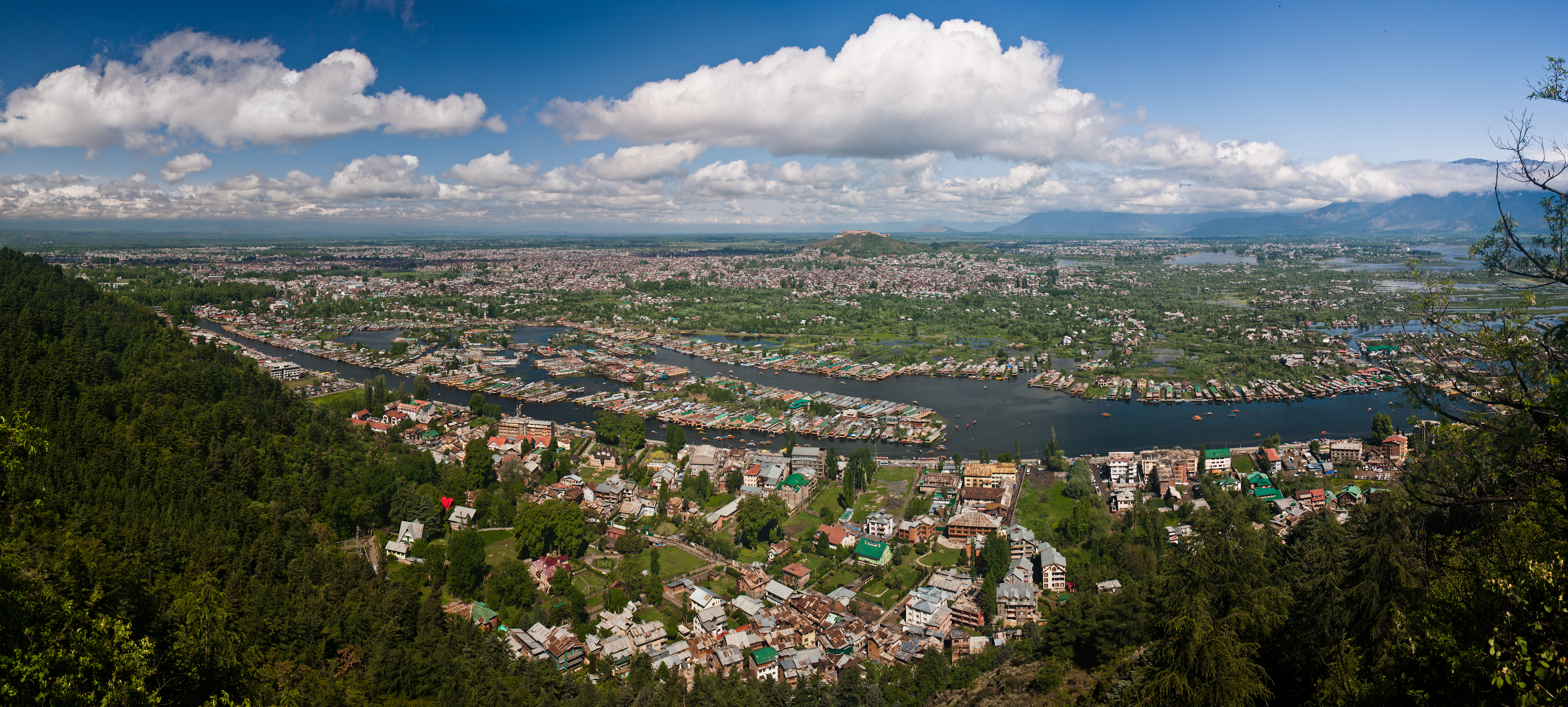
View of Dal Lake and the city of Srinagar from Shankaracharya Hill

== History ==
Dal is mentioned as Mahasarit (Sanskrit: महासरित्, romanized: Mahāsarit, lit. 'great lake') in ancient Sanskrit texts. Ancient history records mention that a village named Isabar to the east of Dal was the residence of goddess Durga. This place was known as Sureshwari on the bank of the lake, which was sourced by a spring called the Satadhara. The name "Sureshwari" refers to the goddess Parvati, suggesting that the lake was once considered sacred and possibly associated with the goddess.

During the Mughal period, the Mughal rulers of India designated Kashmir, Srinagar in particular, as their summer resort. They developed the precincts of the Dal in Srinagar with sprawling Mughal-type gardens and pavilions as pleasure resorts to enjoy the salubrious cool climate. After the death of Aurangzeb in 1707, which led to the disintegration of the Mughal Empire, Pashtun tribes in the area around the lake and city increased, and the Afghan Durrani Empire ruled the city for several decades. In 1814 a significant part of the Kashmir valley, including Srinagar, was annexed from the Afghans by Maharaja Ranjit Singh to his kingdom, and the Sikhs grew in influence in the region for 27 years.

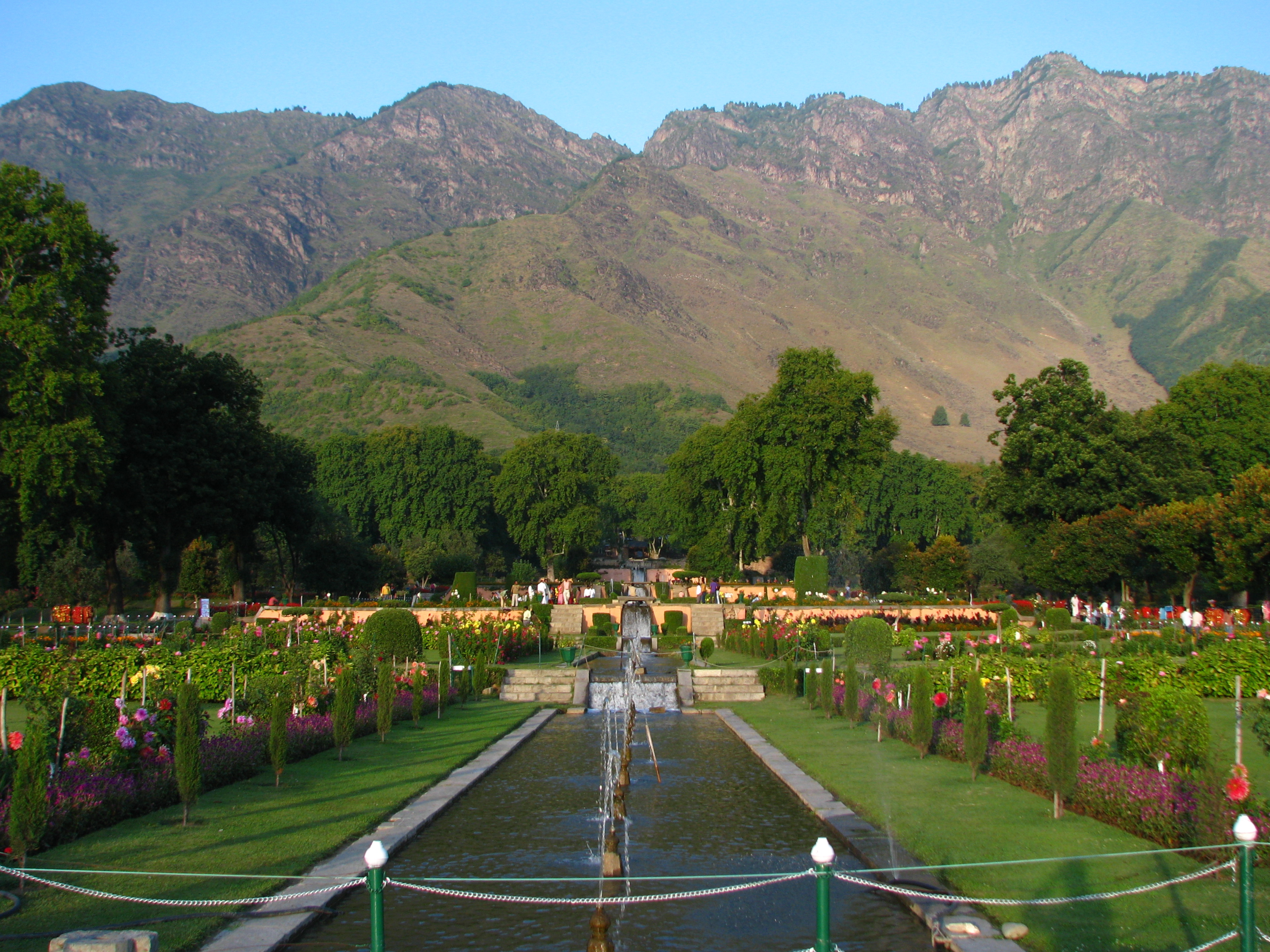
Nishat Bagh Mughal Gardens

During the Dogra Raj, Srinagar became the capital of Dogra territory, attracted by the cool climate of the Kashmir valley, amidst the backdrop of the majestic snow covered Himalayan ranges. The lake precincts experience temperatures in the range of 1–11 °C (34–52 °F) during winter and 12–30 °C (54–86 °F) during the summer season. The lake freezes when temperatures drop to about −11 °C (12 °F) during severe winter. Although the Dogra Maharaja of Kashmir restricted the building of houses in the valley, the British circumvented this rule by commissioning lavish houseboats to be built on the Dal. The houseboats have been referred to as, "each one a little piece of England afloat on Dal."

After the independence of India, the Kashmiri Hanji people have built, owned and maintained these houseboats, cultivating floating gardens and producing commodities for the market, making them the centre of their livelihoods. The houseboats, closely associated with Dal also provide accommodation in Srinagar. Following the Mughal, Afghan, Sikh and Dogra rule, the place has earned the epithet, "Jewel in the crown of Kashmir".

== Physical properties ==
=== Topography ===
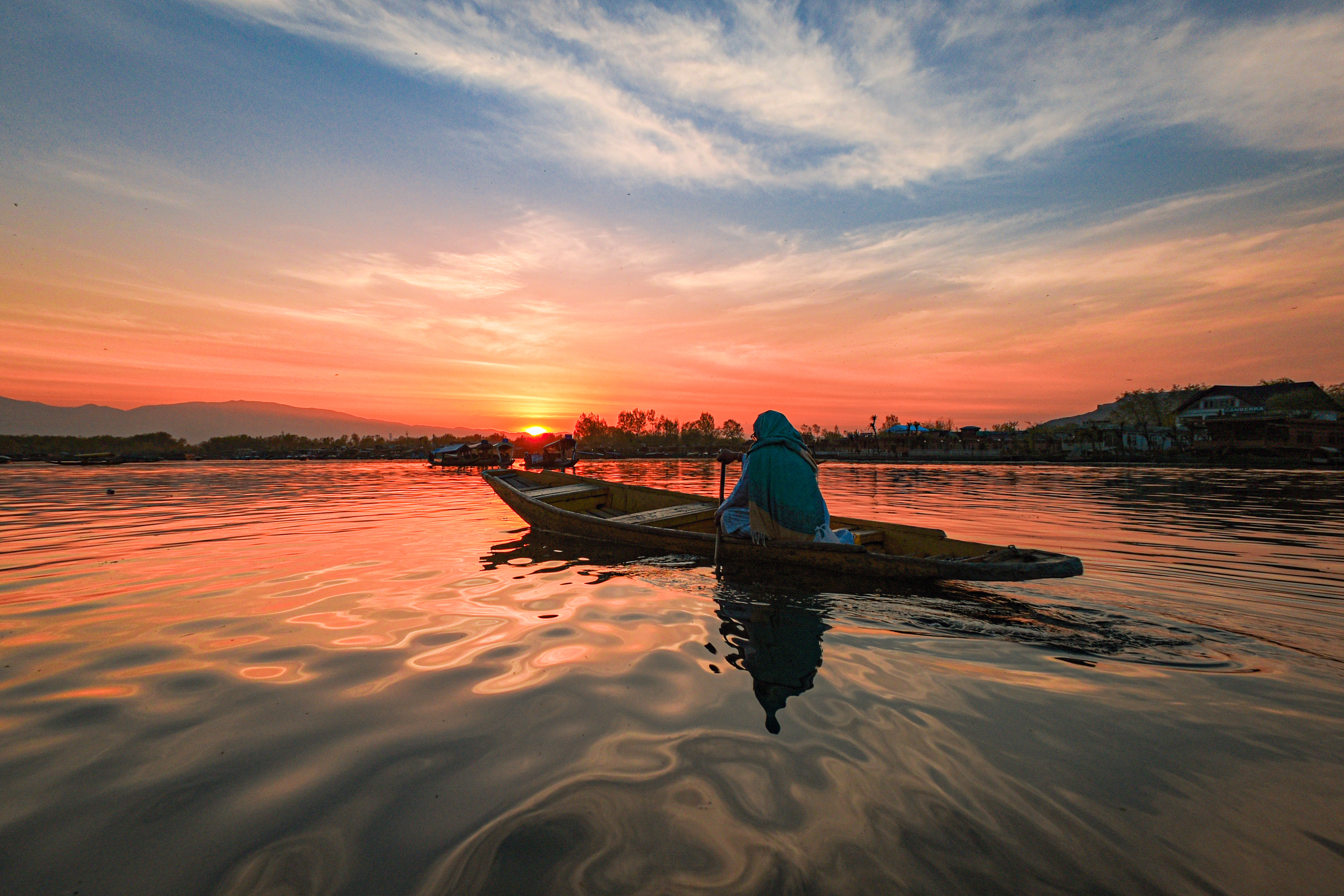
A sunset view

The lake is located within a catchment area covering 316 square kilometres (122 mi^{2}) in the Zabarwan mountain valley, in the foothills of the Shankaracharya Hill, which surrounds it on three sides. The lake, which lies to the east and north of Srinagar city covers an area of 18 square kilometres (6.9 mi^{2}), although including the floating gardens of lotus flowers, it is 21.2 square kilometres (8.2 mi^{2}) (an estimated figure of 22–24 square kilometres (8.5–9.3 mi^{2}) is also mentioned). The main basin draining the lake is a complex of five interconnected basins with causeways; the Nehru Park basin, the Nishat basin, the Hazratbal basin, the Nigeen basin and the Barari Nambal basin. Navigational channels provide the transportation links to all the five basins.

The average elevation of the lake is 1,583 metres (5,194 ft). The depth of water varies from 6 metres (20 ft) at its deepest in Nigeen lake to 2.5 metres (8.2 ft), the shallowest at Gagribal. The depth ratio between the maximum and minimum depths varies with the season between 0.29 and 0.25, which is interpreted as flat bed slope. The length of the lake is 7.44 kilometres (4.62 mi) with a width of 3.5 kilometres (2.2 mi). The lake has a basin having shore length of 15.5 kilometres (9.6 mi) and roads run all along the periphery. Irreversible changes through urban developments have placed further restrictions on the flow of the lake and as a result, marshy lands have emerged on the peripheral zones, notably in the foothill areas of the Shankaracharya and Zaharbwan hills. These marshy lands have since been reclaimed and converted into large residential complexes.

=== Geology ===
Multiple theories explaining the origin of this lake have been formulated. One version is that it is the remnants of a post-glacial lake, which has undergone drastic changes in size over the years and the other theory is that it is of fluvial origin from an old flood spill channel or ox-bows of the Jhelum River. The dendritic drainage pattern of the catchment signifies that its rock strata have low levels of porosity. Lithologically, a variety of rock types have been discerned namely, igneous, metamorphic and sedimentary. The Dachigam Telbal Nallah system is conjectured to follow two major lineaments. Discontinuous surfaces seen in the terrain are attributed to the angular and parallel drainage pattern. The water table cuts the hill slopes, which is evidenced by the occurrence of numerous springs in the valley. Seismic activity in the valley is recorded under Zone V of the Seismic Zoning Map of India, the most severe zone where frequent damaging earthquakes of intensity IX could be expected. In the year 2005, Kashmir valley experienced one of the severe earthquakes measured at 7.6 on the Richter's scale, which resulted in deaths and the destruction of many properties, leaving many homeless.

=== Hydrology ===
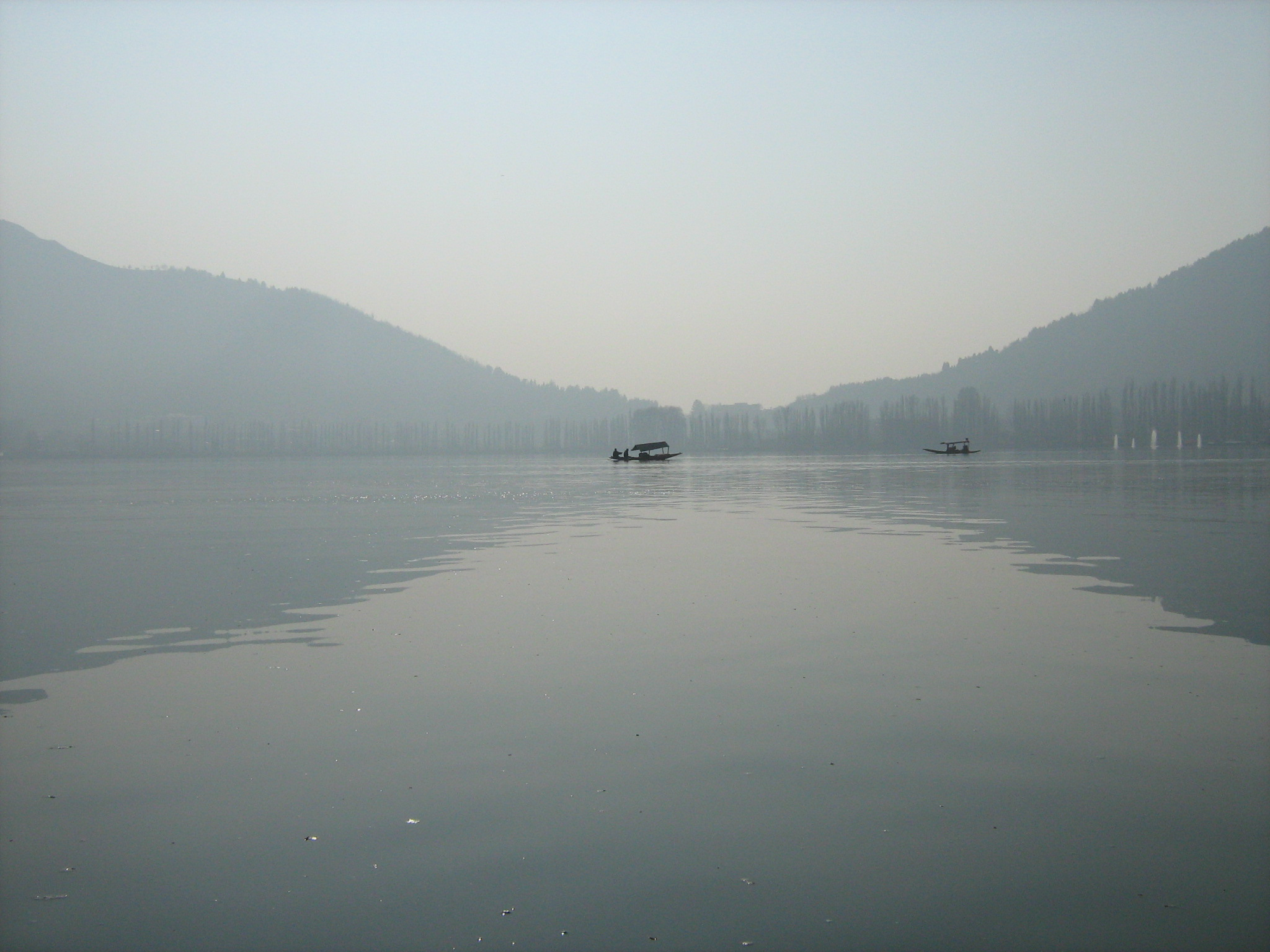
Dal

The shallow, open-drainage lake is fed by Dachigam-Telbal Nallah (with perennial flow), Dara Nallah ('Nallah' means "stream") and many other small streams. The lake is classified as 'warm monomictic' under the sub-tropical lake category. Spring sources also contribute to the flow, although no specific data is available to quantify their contribution. To address this, water balance studies to analyse and assess the characteristics of flow have been conducted in order to approximate the discharge contributed by the springs in the lake bed. The complex land use pattern of the valley is reflected in the urbanised Srinagar in its north, with rice fields, orchards and gardens in the lower slopes, and barren hills beyond steep sloping hills. The flat topography also affects drainage conditions. It receives an average annual rainfall of 655 millimetres (25.8 in) in the catchment, but during the summer, snow melt from the higher ranges of the catchment results in large inflows into the lake. The maximum flood discharge of Telbal Nallah has been assessed as 141.5 metres^{3}/s for a one in hundred return period; the 1973 observed flood in Telbal Nallah has been estimated as 113 metres^{3}/s. The average annual flow, according to discharge measurements, has been estimated as 291.9 million cubic metres, with Telbal Nalah accounting for 80% of the total and 20% contributed by other sources. The silt load has been estimated at 80,000 tonnes per year with 70% contribution from the Telabal Nallah, with 36,000 tonnes recorded as settling in the lake.

There are two outlets from the lake, namely the Dalgate and Amir Khan Nallah that connects the lakes of Nigeen and Anchar Lake. Dalgate is controlled by a weir and lock system. The outflow from these two outlets has been estimated as 275.6 million cubic metres.

== Flora and fauna ==
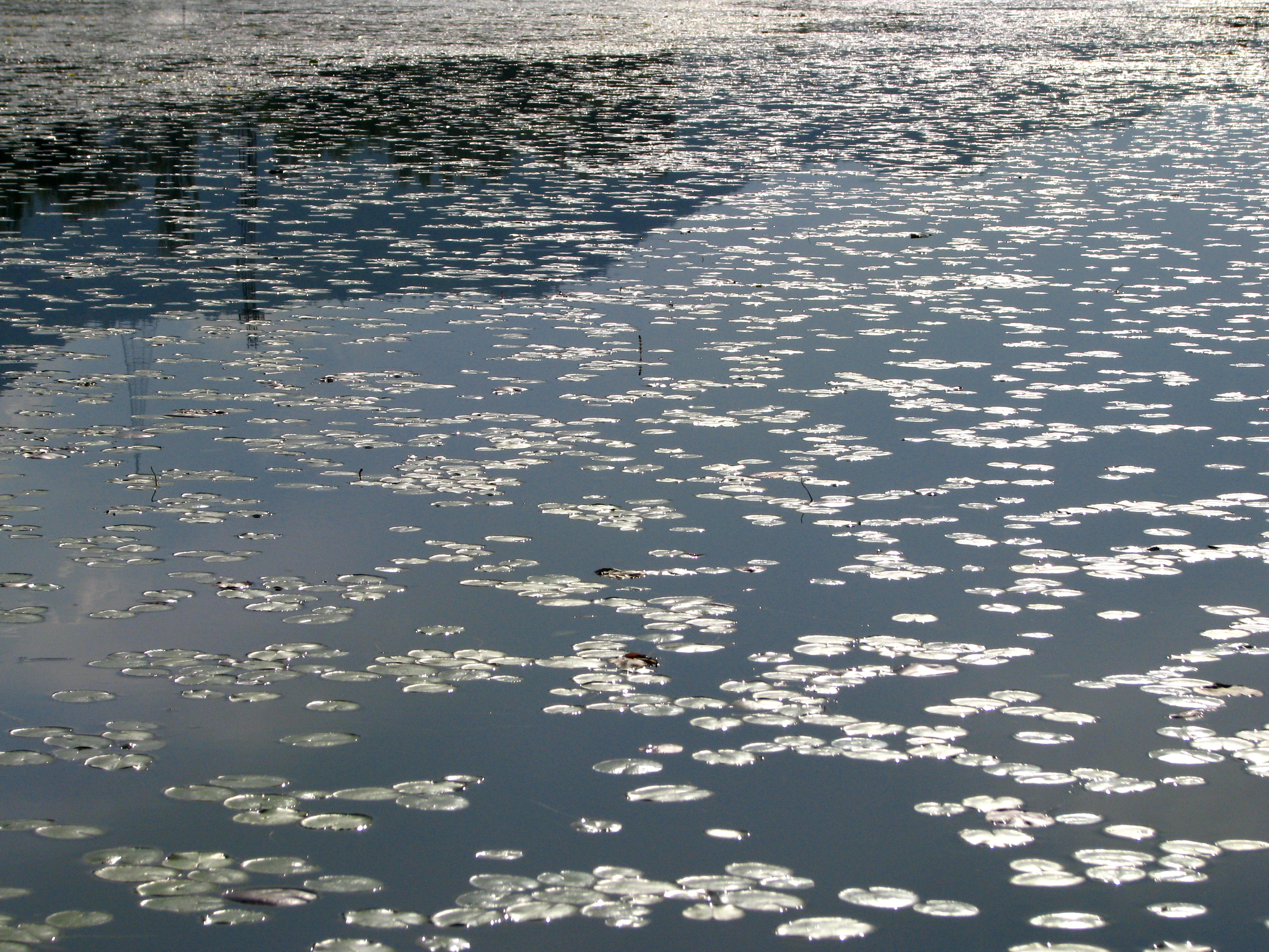
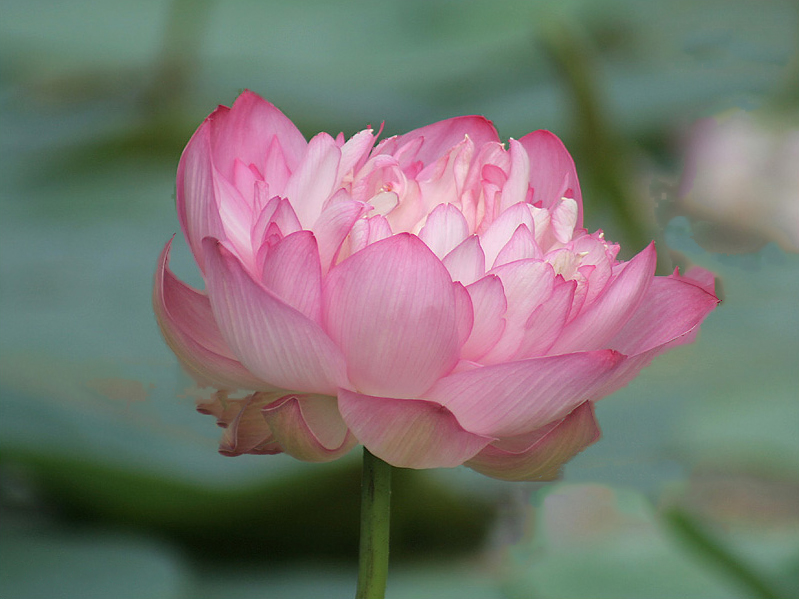
Left: Dal Lake lily pads. Right: Nelumbo nucifera widely grown in the floating gardens of Dal Lake

The ecosystem of Dal is ecologically rich in macrophytes, submerged macrophytes, floating macrophytes and phytoplankton. Macrophyte flora recorded in the lake's aquatic and marshland environment consists of 117 species, belonging to 69 genera and 42 families. The lake is noted in particular for its Nelumbo nucifera (lotus) which bloom in July and August. The prolific growth of Ceratophyllum demersum in the eutrophic zones has been reported, with Myriophyllum spicatum and Potemogetton lucens cited as dominant species. Other macrophytes discerned in different zones of the lake include Typho angustata, Phragmites australis, Myriophyllum, Sparganium evectum and Myriophyllum verticillatum, which contribute to the production of macrophytes. The rooted variety of the floating leaf type consists of Nelumbo nucifera, N. alba, N. tetragonia, N. candida, Nymphoides peltata, Salvinia natans, Hydrocharis dubia, and Potamogeton natans, all of which occupy 29.2% of the lake. Phytoplanktons include Navicula radiosa, Nitzschia accicularis, Fragilaria crotonensis, Diatoma elongatum, Scenedesmus bijuga, Pediastrum duplex, Tetraedron minimum, Microcystis aeruginosa and Merismopedia elegans.

Since 1934, some important changes have been observed in the lake's biota, including a reduction in the number of Chara species, and an increase in the area covered by Salvinia since 1937. Analysis of the lake has also revealed the tendency for it to develop monospecific communities of submerged macrophytes such as Ceratophyllum and Myriophyllum.

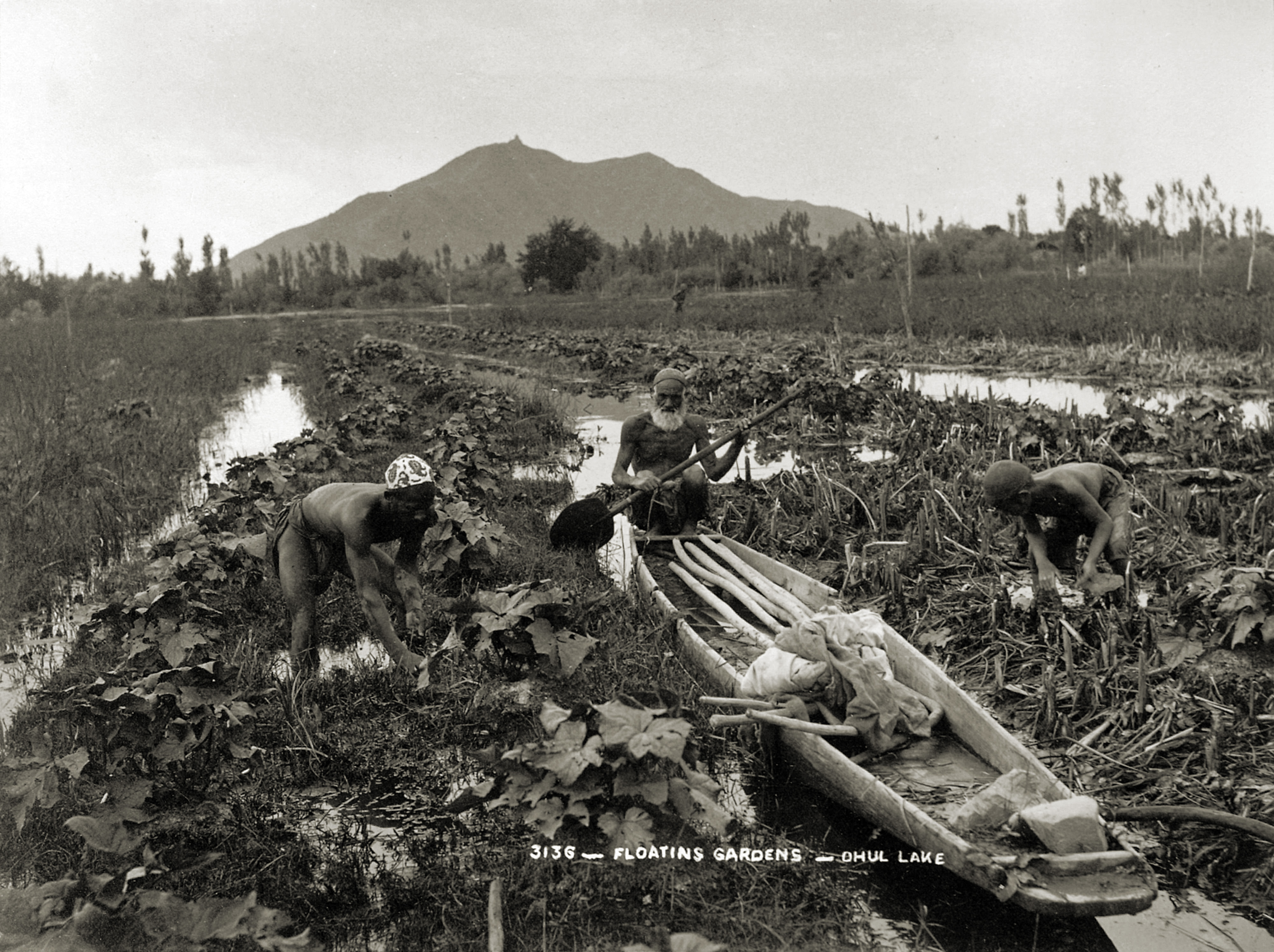
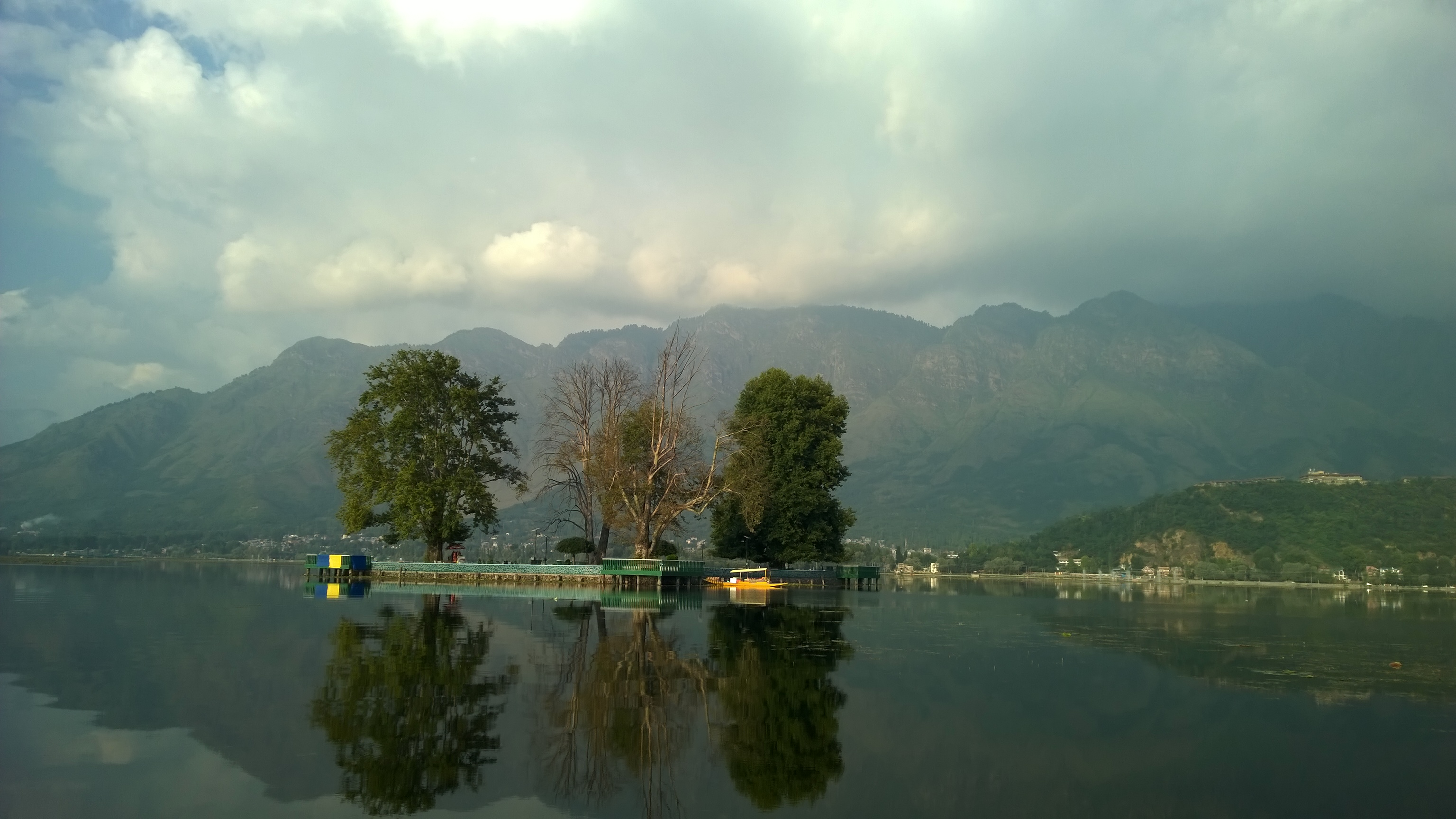
Left: Floating gardens in Dal Lake. Right: Char (Four Chinar Trees) seen on an island in Dal Lake

Woody vegetation in the catchment of the lake consists of species of Melia, Ailanthus, Robinia, Daphne, Celtis, Roses, Ephedra, and Pinus roxburghii, Pinus halepensis, Pinus gerardiana, Cupressus torulosa and Cupressus arizonica. The valley also has a rich cultivation of crops such as paddy, wheat and fodder.

Floating gardens, labelled the 'Rad' in the Kashmiri language are a special feature of the lake. They basically constitute of matted vegetation and earth, but are floating. These are detached from the bottom of the lake and drawn to a suitable place (generally to the north west of the houseboats' location) and anchored. Given its rich nutrient properties, tomatoes, cucumbers and melons are grown with noteworthy results.

Faune found in the lake include Keratella cochlearis, K. serrulata, Botrytis cinerea, Brachionus plicatilis, Monostyla bulla, Alona monocantha, Cyclops ladakanus and Mesocyclops leukarti, all zooplankton, Chironomus species (midges), and Tubifex species (sludge worms), and fish including Cyprinus carpio specularis (economically important), C. carpio communis, Schizothorax niger, S. esocinus, S. curviformis and Crossochelius latius. It is also reported that Cyprinus, introduced in the early sixties, are dominant and that the indigenous species Schizothorax niger is showing a declining trend.

Fishing resources

The fishing industry on Dal is the second largest industry in the region and is central to many of the people's livelihoods who reside on the lake's periphery. Dal's commercial fisheries are particularly reliant on carp fish species, which were introduced into the lake in 1957. As a result, carp constitutes 70% of all the fish caught in the lake while the schizothorax constitutes 20% and other species account for 10%. Fishermen use a locally manufactured cast net which comprises six parts with a diameter of 6 metres. It is operated from a wooden fishing boat made out of Cedrus deodara, typically 20ftx4ft in size. The gradual decline in quality of the lake water through pollution has resulted in lower fish stocks and the extinction of endemic varieties of fish. The causes for such deterioration have been identified and remedial actions have been initiated. The various fishing nets being used in Dal are cast net (Zaal/Duph), Long line (Walruz), Gill net (Pachi, Shaitan Zaal), Rod and line (Bislai), Scoop net (Attha Zaal) (Bhat et al., 2008).

The lake is warm monomictic (mixing type) and the pH value recorded has varied from a minimum of 7.2 to a maximum of 8.8 on the surface over a yearly period. The Dissolved oxygen [mg l^{−1}] value has varied from a minimum of 1.4 to a maximum of 12.3 on the surface within a year. The Recorded maximum nitrogen concentration (NH_{4}-N [micro l^{−1}] has been recorded as 1315 on the surface and 22 at the bottom of the lake. Phosphorus concentration expressed in Total-P [micro l^{−1}] has varied from a high of 577 to a low of 35 during the 12 months of the year. The lake water temperature has varied from a minimum of 3 °C (37 °F) in January to 26 °C (79 °F) in June at the surface. Transparency, expressed as depth in metres, has varied from a maximum of 1.95 metres (6.4 ft) in July to a minimum of 0.53 metres (1.7 ft) in March, over the 12 months period.

Studies of the water quality of the lake in 1983–84 indicate a decline in quality since the 1965–66 analysis. Scientific research over the years also reveal that Telbal, Botkal, and sewage drains are responsible for a substantial influx of nitrogen and phosphorus into the lake. Quantitatively, fifteen drains and several other sources have released a total of 156.62 tonnes (56.36 tonnes by drains alone) of phosphorus, and 241.18 tonnes of inorganic nitrogen into the lake from a discharge of 11.701 million cubic metres /year. Non-point sources, such as seepage and diffused runoff, also add to this pollution and have been recorded as further adding 4.5 tonnes of total phosphates and 18.14 tonnes of nitrogen (NO_{3}–N and NH_{4}–N) to the lake. Based on the values mentioned above, it has been inferred that the water quality of the lake has deteriorated.

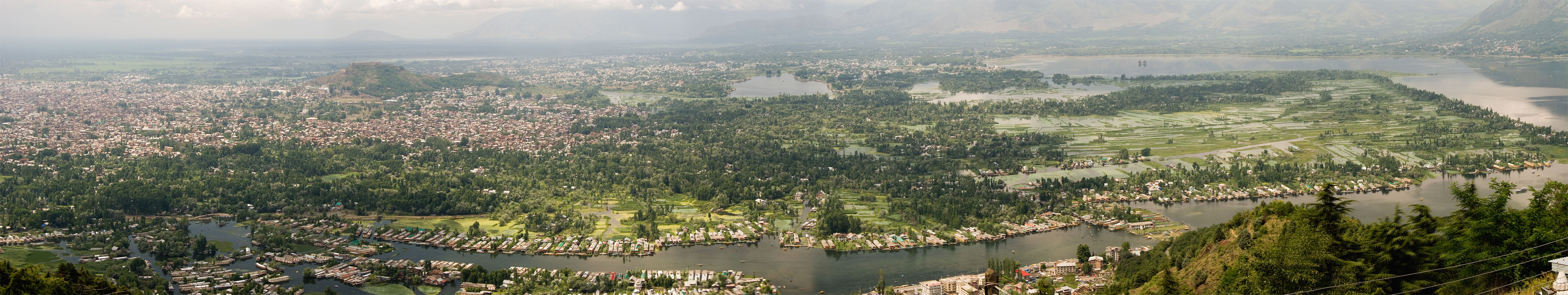
Panoramic view of the Dal

The major environmental problem facing the lake is eutrophication, which has required immediate remedial measures to combat it. Alarmingly, the size of the lake has shrunk from its original area of 22 square kilometres (8.5 mi^{2}) to the present area of 18 square kilometres (6.9 mi^{2}), and there is a concerning rate of sediment deposition due to catchment area degradation. The water quality has also deteriorated due to intense pollution caused by the untreated sewage and solid waste that is fed into the lake from the peripheral areas and from the settlements and houseboats. Besides, some experts like Dr. A. A. Kazmi (Associate Professor, IIT Roorkee and in charge of the Environmental Engineering Lab) believe that deforestation in the catchment of Dal and Telbal stream may have led to more nitrogen and phosphorus-rich run-off, further aiding eutrophication. Encroachments of water channels and consequent clogging has diminished the circulation and inflows into the lake, so with the building up of phosphates and nitrogen, this has led to extensive weed growth and consequences on the biodiversity of the lake.

=== Public interest litigations and restoration works ===
Identifying the above major issues as causes for the deterioration of the lake, a multidisciplinary team of experts have prepared a Detailed Project Report (DPR), which has the objective of achieving environment and sustainability, ecological improvement with minimum interventions and displacement and balancing the conflicts of interest. This plan is now under implementation with the financial assistance of the Government of India.

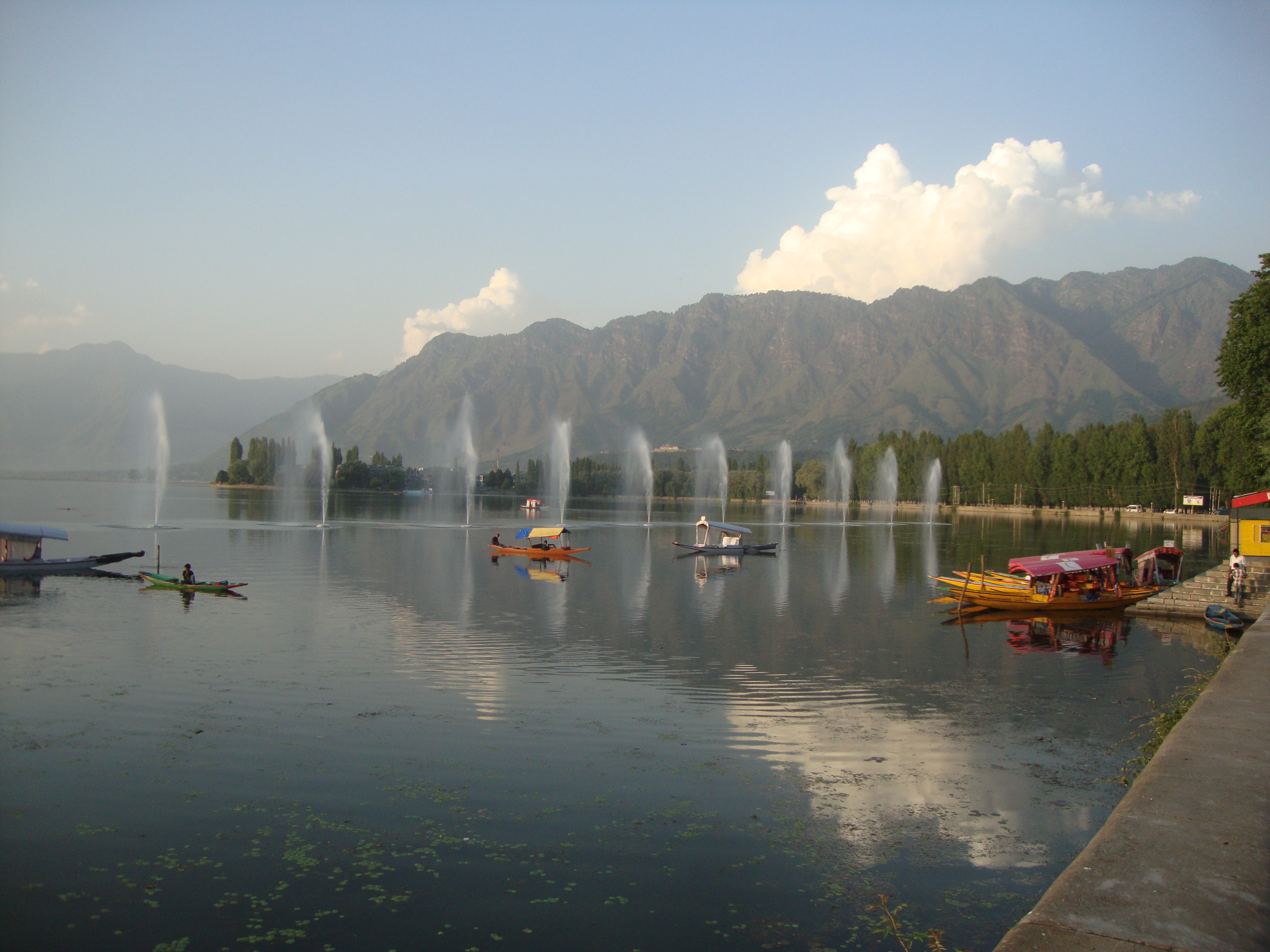
Dal, Srinagar, July 2012

The serious nature of the environmental problems the lake has been experienced has been widely publicised and has been brought to the attention of the Supreme Court of India. Public Interest Litigations (PILs) have been filed in court demonstrating the environmental dangers posed to the lake by sewage, wastes and effluents. The PILs have sought injunctions of the court for setting up of an integrated ring sewage system encircling the Lake; release of funds by the Government of India to undertake measures to check pollution and to inaugurate a High Powered Committee to monitor proper utilisation of the allotted funds. The committee is under obligation to post feedback of progression developments from time to time, directly to the Supreme Court. The PIL, filed in 2001, has resulted in a number of directives from the court to the funding and implementing agencies and the case is continuing. Consequently, under the National Lake Conservation Plan of the Ministry of Environment and Forests of the Government of India, funds to the extent ₹2987.6 million were sanctioned in September 2005 for the conservation of the lake. The restoration and rehabilitation measures envisaged under the "Conservation and Management of Dal" are under various stages of implementation with the funds allocated by the Government of India for the purpose. Some of the measures undertaken for rehabilitating the lake to bring it to its original eutrophication free status involved measures such as construction of siltation tanks, mechanical weeding, regrouping of houseboats, deepening of outflow channel and removal of bunds and barricades, including some floating gardens. In addition, a moratorium has been imposed on new construction works close to the lakefront, including the building of new house boats. Resettlement plans for migrating the population from the lakefront have also evolved. The long-term development plans also deal with the reafforestation of catchment area to reduce erosion movement and movement of silt and to regulate grazing by livestock. Recent reports indicate that, as of 2010, 40% of the measures have been implemented.

== Uses and attractions ==
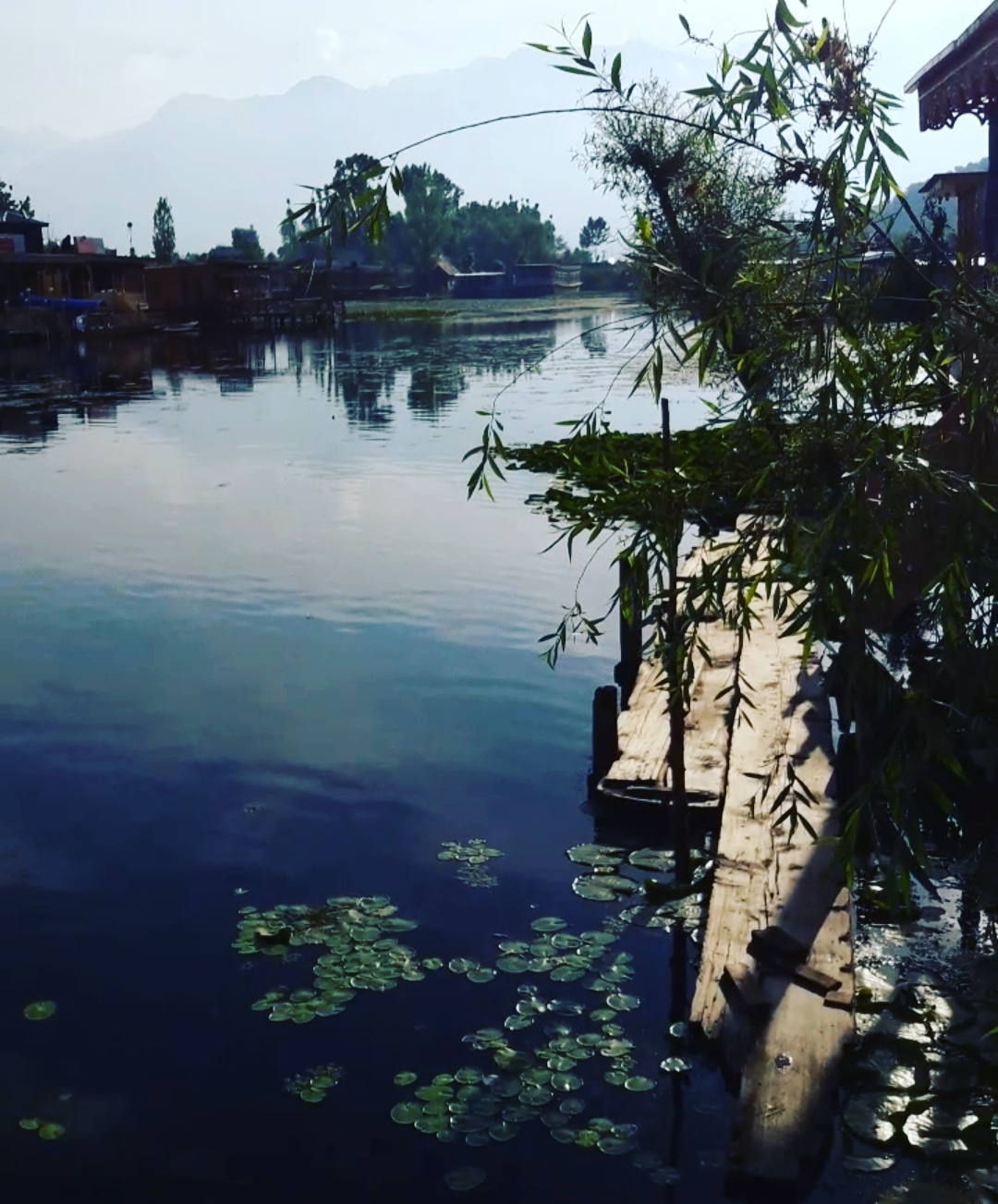
Dal lake in 2017

The lake is popular as a visitor attraction and a summer resort. Fisheries and the harvesting of food and fodder plants are also important on Dal. Weeds from the lake are extracted and converted into compost for the gardens. It also serves as a flood lung of the Jhelum River. Swimming, boating, snow skiing (particularly when the lake is frozen during the severe winter), and canoeing are amongst some of the water sports activities practised on the lake.

The lake has numerous sites and places of interest, many of which are important to the cultural heritage of Srinagar. Aside from the Shalimar Bagh and Nishat Bagh, some of the other places frequented by tourists are the Shankaracharya temple, the Hari Parbat, the Nigeen Lake, the Chashme Shahi, the Hazratbal Shrine, and the Mazar-e-Shura cemetery containing the graves of famous Mughal-era poets. Visitors and native alike also enjoy relaxing on the water in a houseboat or a shikara boat, often called "the Gondola of Kashmir".

=== Island of Char Chinar ===
A famous landmark in Srinagar is an island on Dal where four Chinar (Platanus orientalis) trees stand, named "Char Chinar". Char in Hindustani (Hindi-Urdu) means four.

=== Nigeen Lake ===
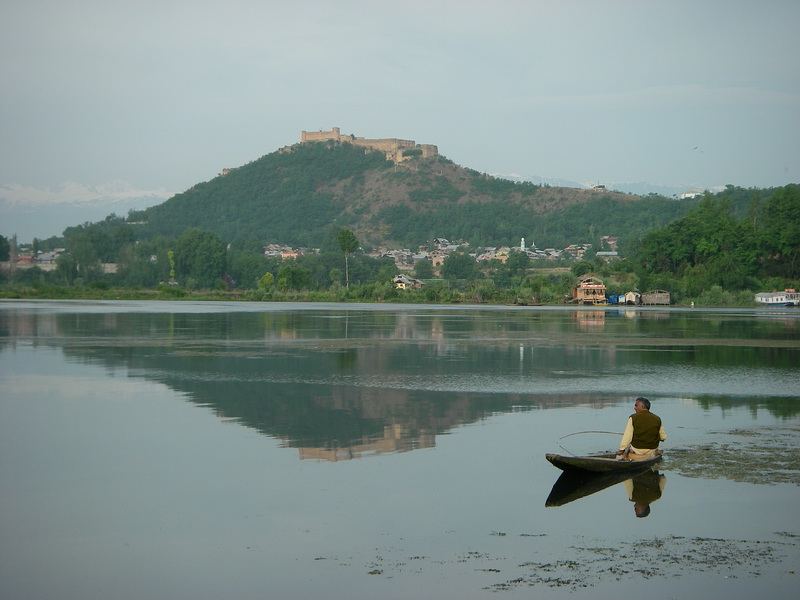
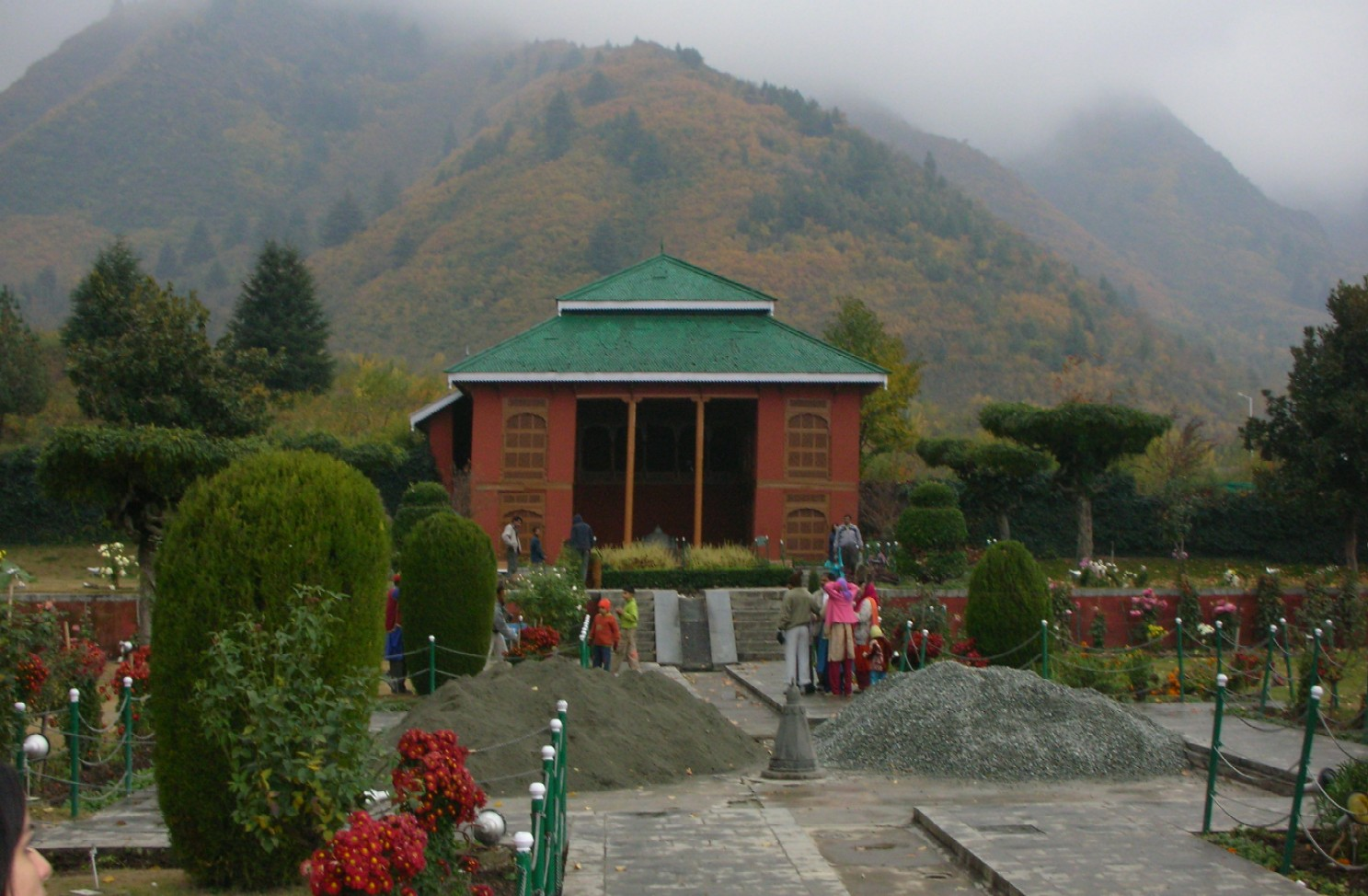
Left: Nagin Lake. Right: Chasme Shahi under renovation

Nigeen Lake, though sometimes referred to as a separate lake, is actually part of Dal, being linked through a causeway which permits only bikers and walkers to enter the lake precincts. The causeway carries the water supply pipeline to the Srinagar city in the east. The lake is bounded by the Shankaracharya Hill (Takht-e-Suleiman) on the south and Hari Parbat on the west and is located at the foot of the Zabarwan Range. Willow and poplar trees flank the edges of the lake.

=== Chashme Shahi ===
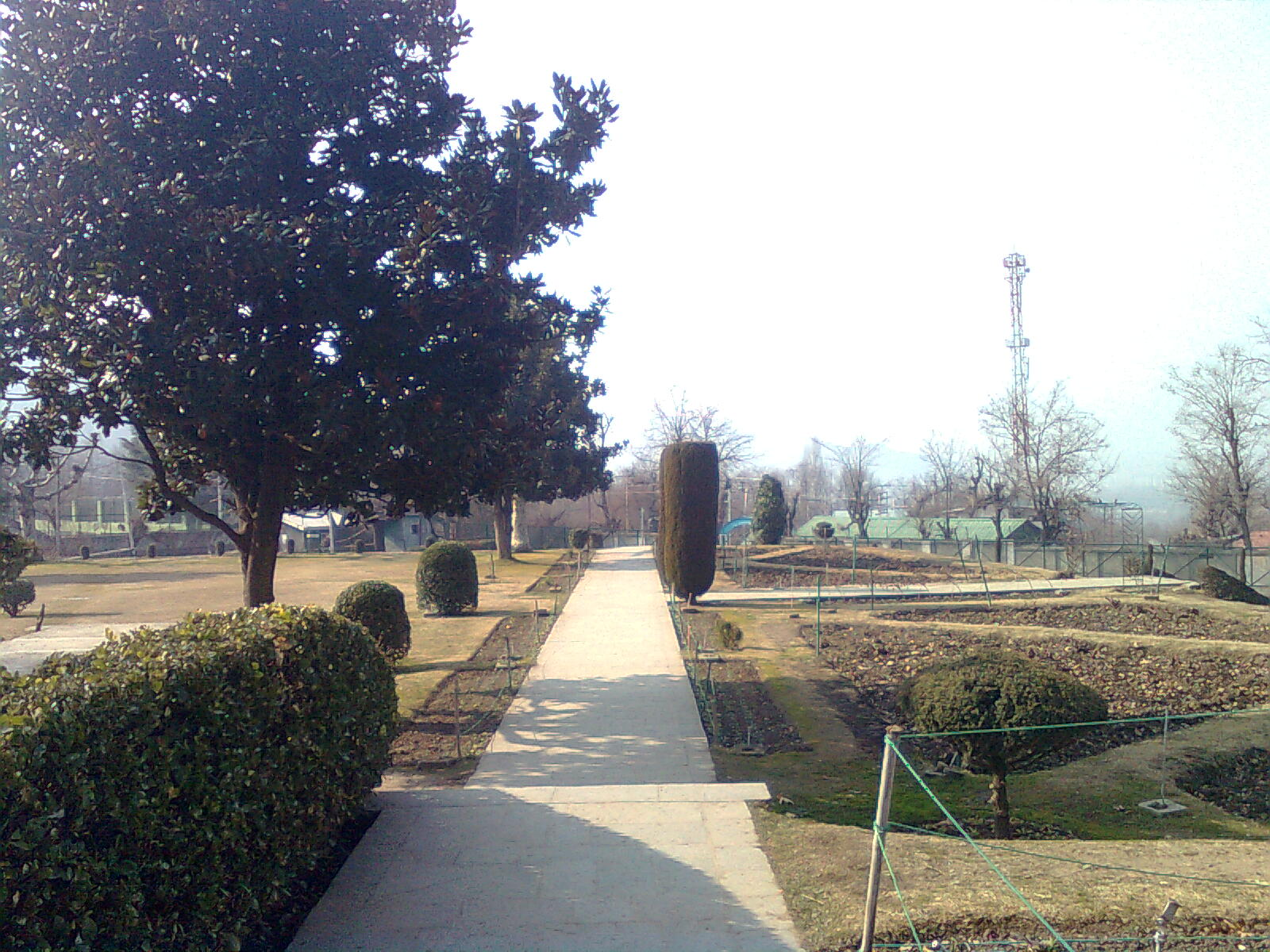
Cheshme Shahi Garden Srinagr

Chashme Shahi (meaning "royal spring"), is a fresh water spring and garden known for its medicinal properties. Its source located above the Nehru Memorial Park. It is the smallest of all the Mughal gardens in Srinagar, measuring 108 metres (354 ft) x 38 metres (125 ft) and it has three terraces, an aqueduct, waterfalls and fountains. Ali Mardan Khan built the garden in 1632, and is built in such a way that the spring water is the source of fountains. From the fountains, water flows along the floor of the pavilion and cascades to a lower terrace over a drop of 5 metres (16 ft) along a polished black stone chute. A small shrine, known as the Chasma Sahibi, is located in the vicinity of the gardens and has a fresh water spring.

=== Shankaracharya Temple ===
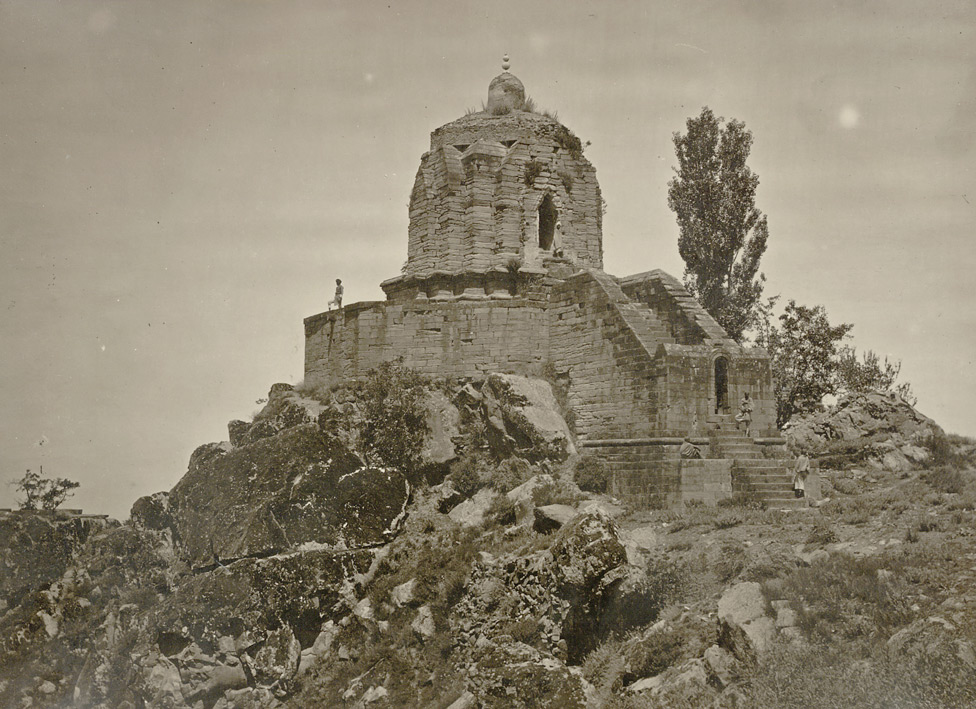
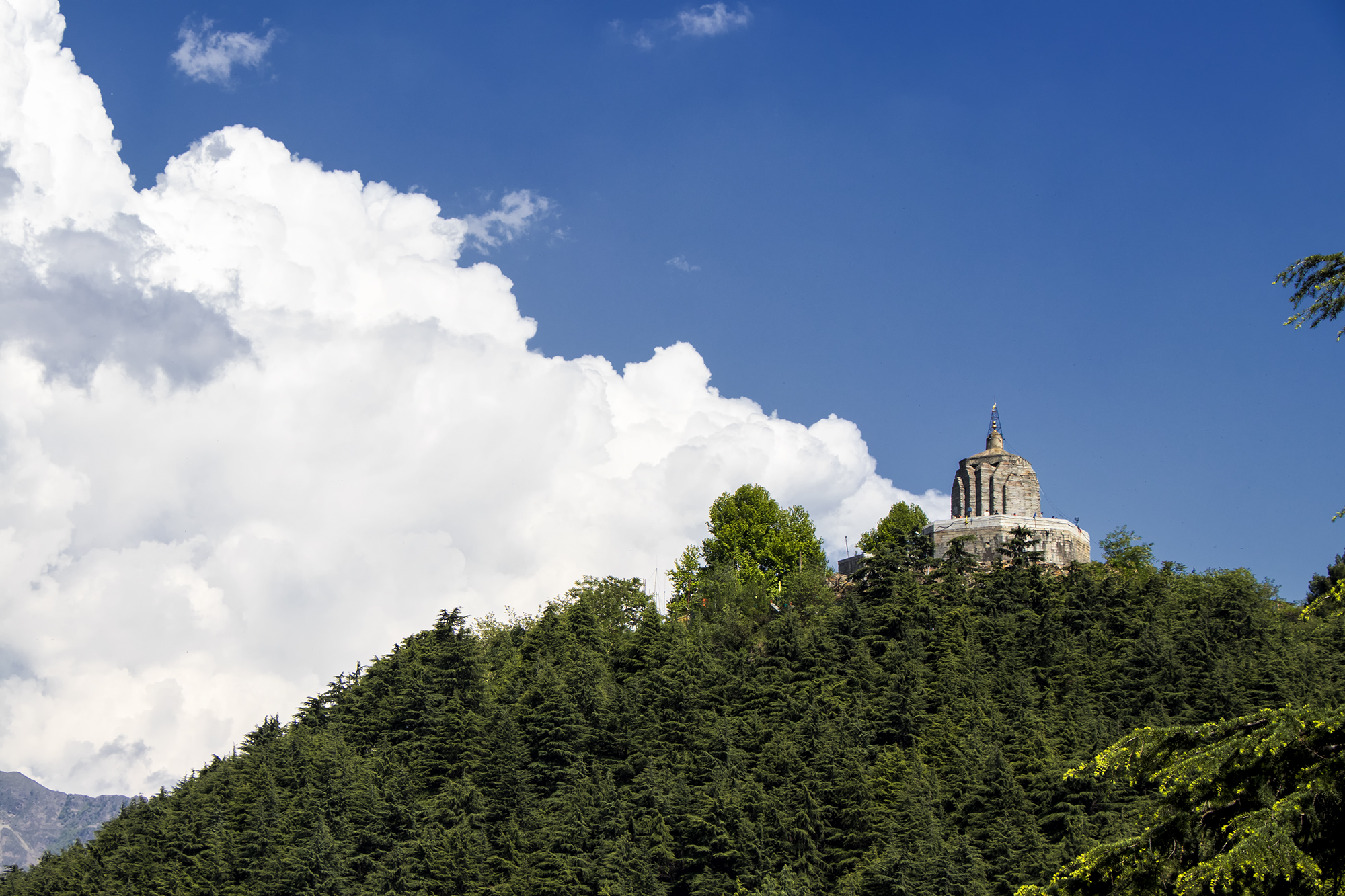
Left: Shankaracharya Temple built in 220 BCE as seen in 1868. Right: Shankaracharya temple as seen now, overlooking Dal Lake

The Shankaracharya Temple is also known as the Jyeshteshwara Temple. It is on top of the Shankaracharya Hill on the Zabarwan Range in Srinagar. It is dedicated to Lord Shiva. The temple is at a height of 1,000 feet (300 m) above the valley floor and overlooks the city of Srinagar.

The temple dates to 220 BCE, although the present structure probably dates to the 9th century CE. It was visited by Adi Shankara and has ever since been associated with him; this is how the temple got the name Shankaracharya. It is also regarded as sacred by Buddhists. Some historians report that the temple was actually a Buddhist temple during the Buddhist era which was then changed into Hindu site of worship by Adi Shankaracharya.

=== Hari Parbat ===
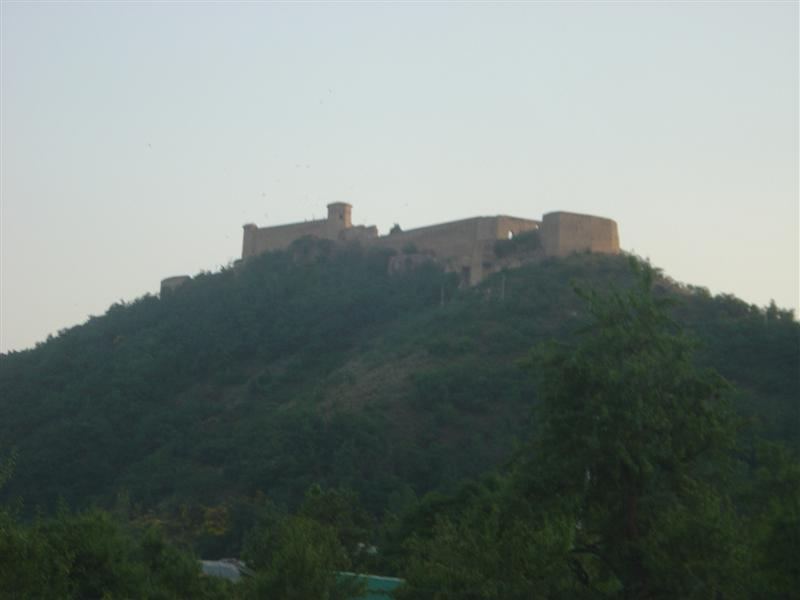
Left: Hari Parbat as seen from Badam Weer (Almond Garden), Srinagar. Right: View of the temple from the stairs

Hari Parbat, also known as the Mughal fort, is a hill fort on Sharika hill that provides panoramic views of the Srinagar city and the Dal. It was first established by Mughal Emperor Akbar in 1590. However, he only erected the outer wall of the fort and his plans to build a new capital called Naga Nagor within it did not materialise. The fort in its current state was built much later in 1808 under the reign of Shuja Shah Durrani. Within the fort's precincts are temples, Muslim shrines, and a Sikh gurudwara. The hill is the subject of many legends in Hindu mythology, and was said to have once been a large sea, inhabited by a demon known as Jalobhava and that the hill grew from a pebble.

=== Hazratbal Shrine ===
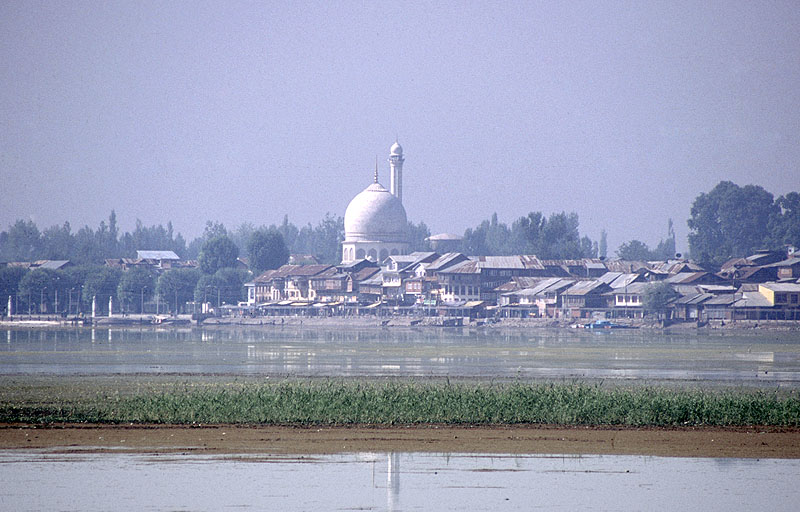
Hazratbal shrine.

The Hazratbal Shrine (Urdu: حضرت بل, literally: Majestic Place), also named Hazratbal, Assar-e-Sharief, or simply Dargah Sharif, is a Muslim shrine situated on the left bank of the Dal and is considered to be Kashmir's holiest Muslim shrine. It contains a relic believed by many Kashmiri Muslims to be the Moi-e-Muqqadas, a hair from the head of the Islamic prophet Muhammad. According to legend, the relic was first brought to India by Syed Abdullah, a descendant of Muhammad who left Medina and settled in Bijapur, near Hyderabad in 1635. When Syed Abdullah died, his son, Syed Hamid, inherited the relic. Following the Mughal conquest of the region, Syed Hamid was stripped of his family estates. Finding himself unable to care for the relic, he gave it as the most precious gift to his close Mureed and a wealthy Kashmiri businessman, Khwaja Nur-ud-Din Ishbari.

=== Mazar-e-Shuara Cemetery ===
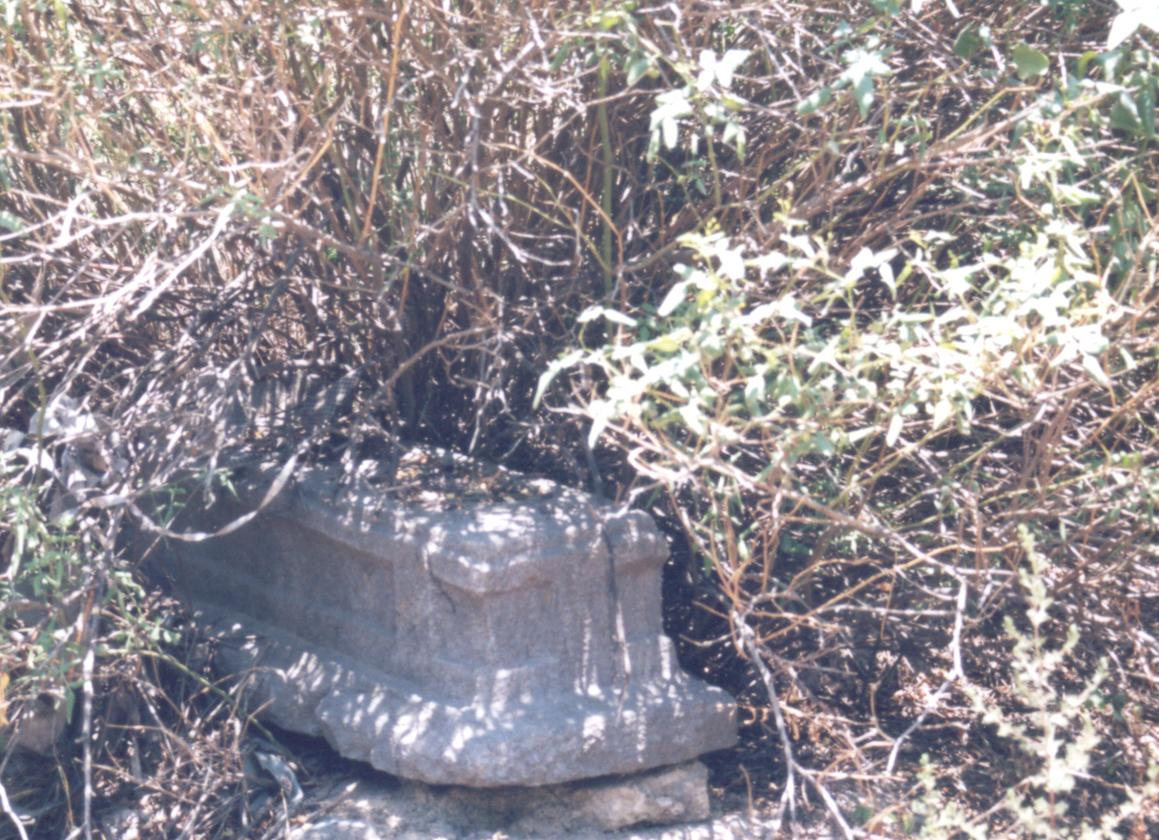
Mazar-e-Shuara cemetery.

Mazar-e-Shuara (Kashmiri: مزارِ شُعاراء, romanized: Mazār-i Śuʿārā, lit. 'cemetery of poets') is a cemetery on a small hill by the main road in Dalgate, an area of Srinagar. Founded in the reign of the Mughal emperor Akbar, it was built in a scenic location on the banks of the Dal as a cemetery for eminent poets. Historical records show that there were at least five poets and men of letters buried in the cemetery: Shah Abu'l-Fatah, Haji Jan Muhammad Qudsi, Abu Talib Kalim Kashani, Muhammad Quli Salim Tehrani, and Tughra-yi Mashhadi, all natives of Iran who emigrated to India and were associated with the Mughal court. Due to neglect, only three tombstones are currently visible, one of which bears an inscription that is only partially legible.

=== Houseboats and shikaras ===
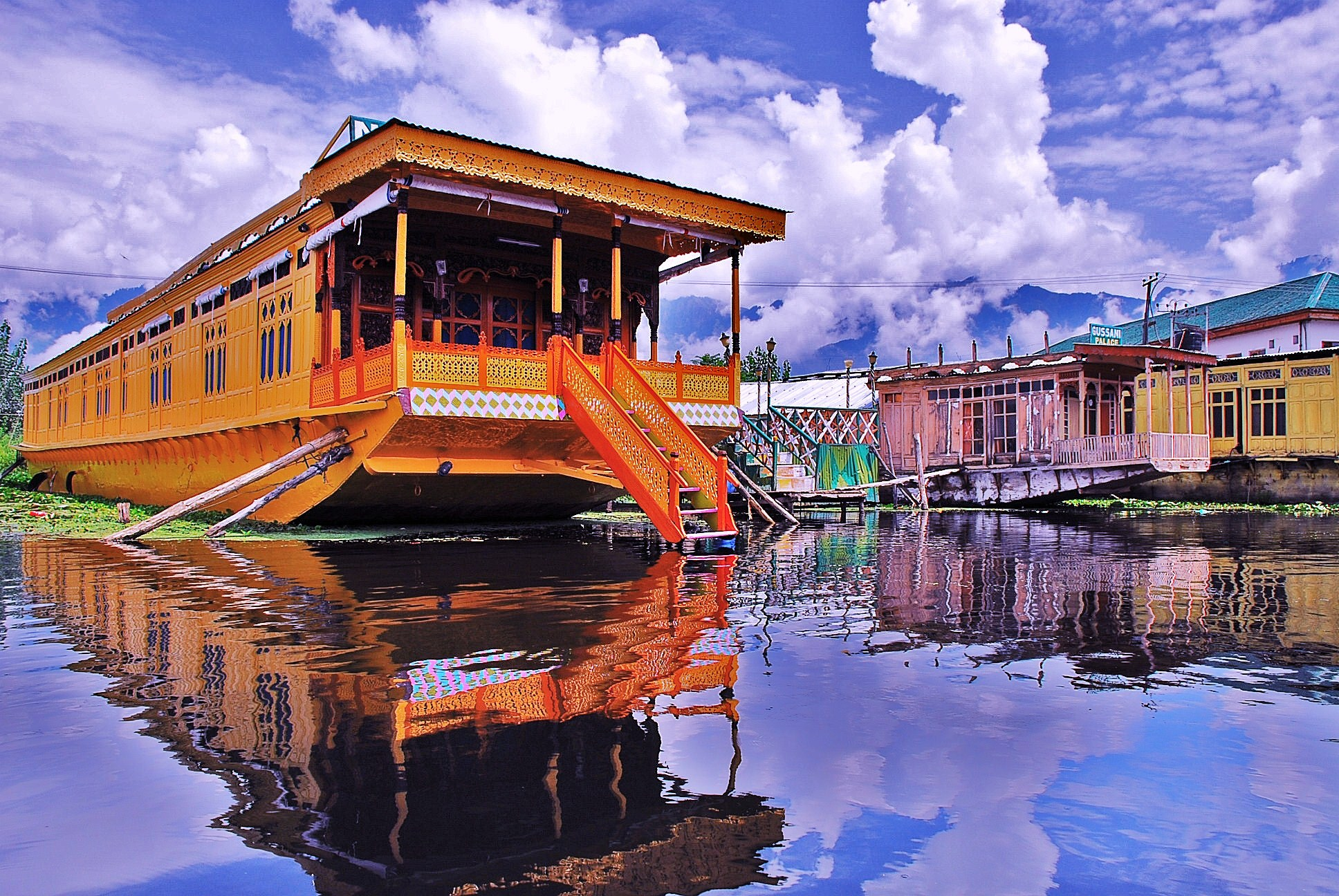
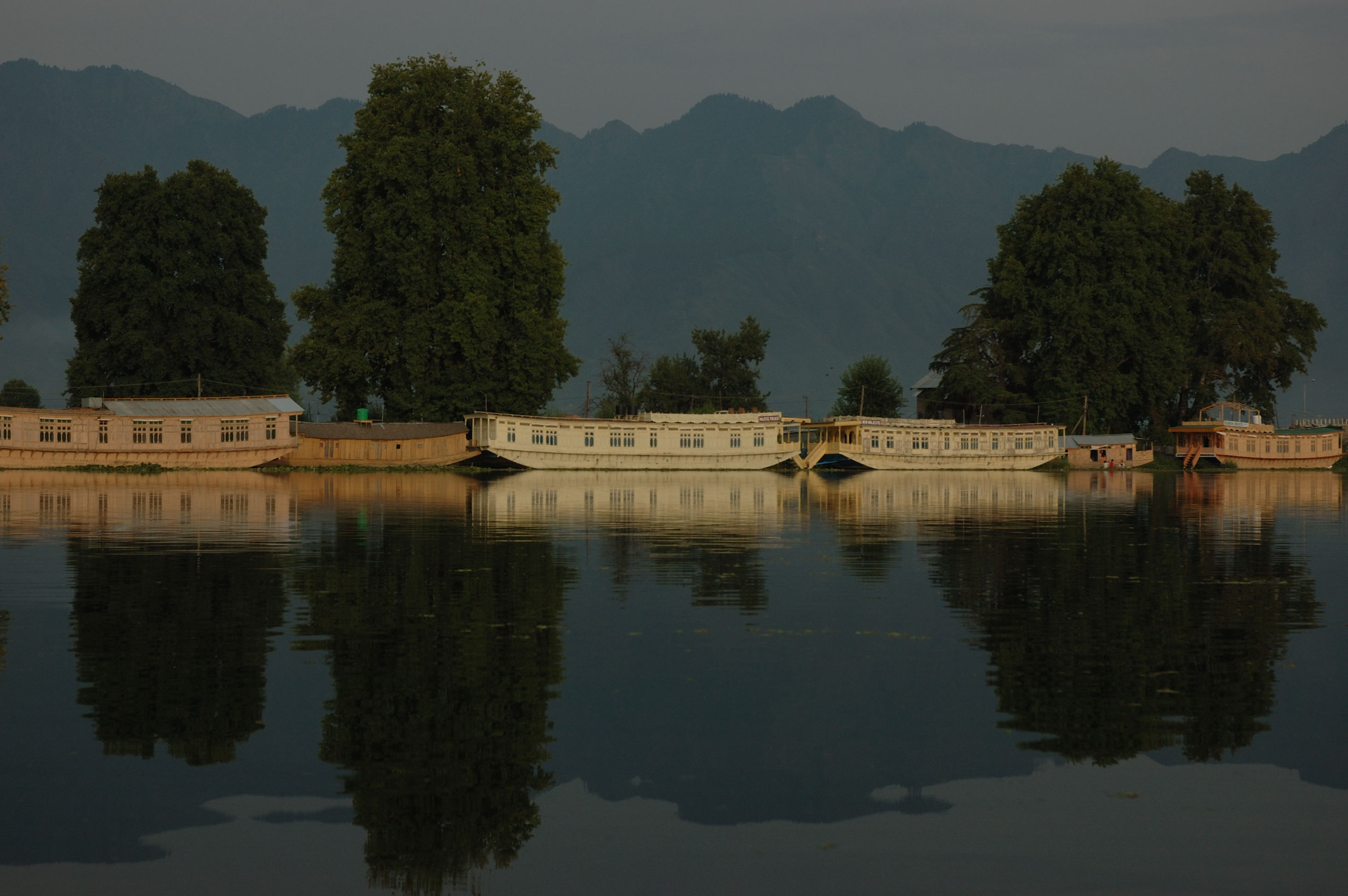
Left: Houseboats, the floating luxury hotels in Dal Lake Right: Houseboats moored to the bank

Houseboats and the Dal are widely associated with Srinagar and are nicknamed "floating palaces", built according to British customs. The houseboats are generally made from local cedar-wood and measure 24–38 metres (79–125 ft) in length and 3–6 metres (9.8–19.7 ft) in width and are graded in a similar fashion to hotels according to level of comfort. Many of them have lavishly furnished rooms, with verandas and a terrace to serve as a sun-deck or to serve evening cocktails. They are mainly moored along the western periphery of the lake, close to the lakeside boulevard in the vicinity of the Dal gate and on small islands in the lake. They are anchored individually, with interconnecting bridges providing access from one boat to the other. The kitchen-boat is annexed to the main houseboat, which also serves as residence of the boatkeeper and their family.

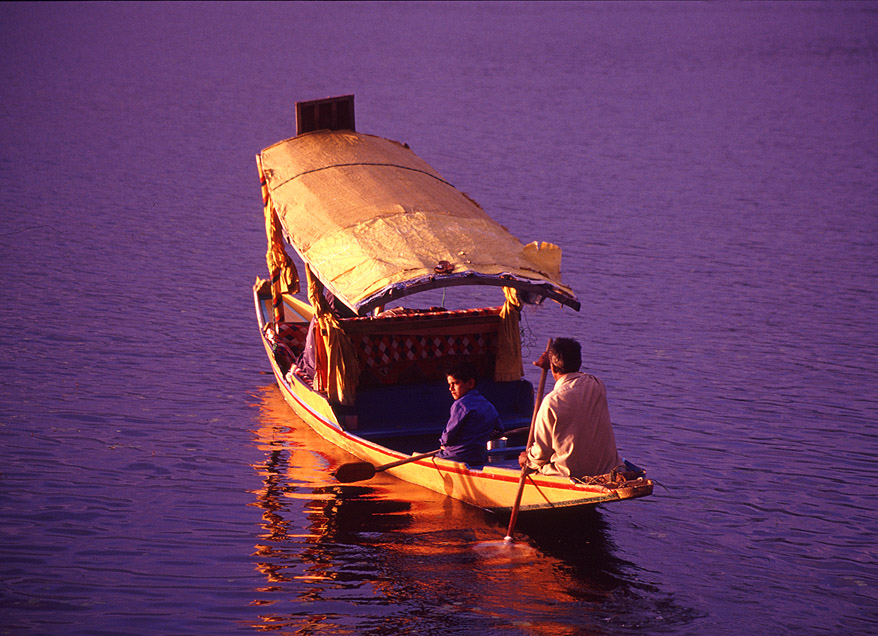
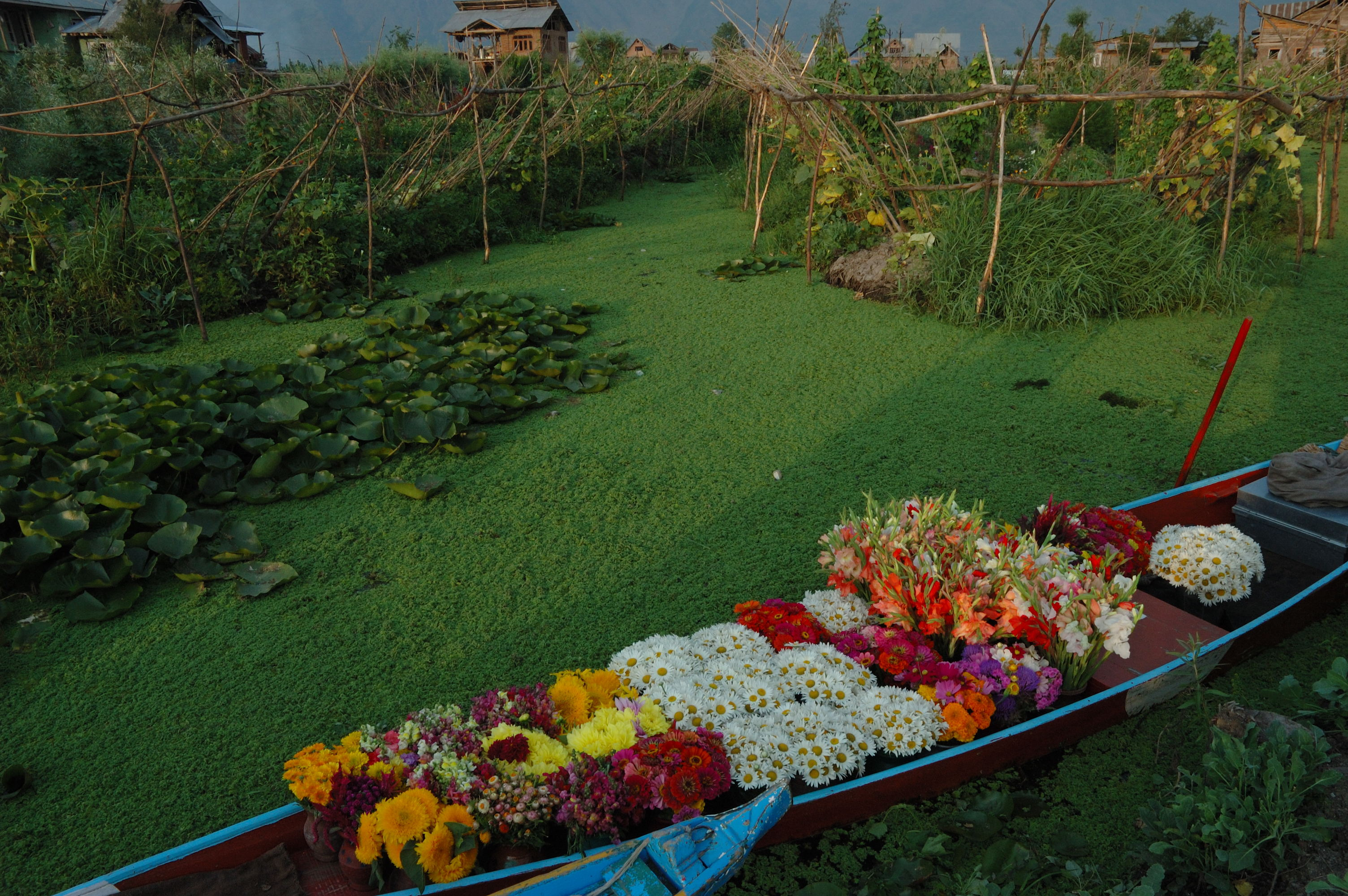
Left: Shikara on Dal Lake. Right: A florist's shikara boat in Nageen Lake

Each houseboat has an exclusive shikara for ferrying guests to the shore. A shikara is a small paddled taxi boat, often about 15 feet (4.6 m) long) and made of wood with a canopy and a spade shaped bottom. It is a cultural symbol of the Kashmir valley, used not only for ferrying visitors but also for the vending of fruits, vegetables and flowers; for fishing and for harvesting aquatic vegetation. All gardens in the lake periphery and houseboats anchored in the lake are approachable through shikaras. The boats are often navigated by one or two boatmen, can seat about six people and have heavily cushioned seats and backrests to provide comfort. The shikara is also used to provide for other sightseeing options in the valley, notably a cruise along the Jhelum River, passing by the famous seven bridges of the city and the backwaters en route.

=== Floating Post Office ===
The floating post office cum Museum at Dal Lake was inaugurated in 2011 by Omar Abdullah, the then Chief Minister of the state of Jammu and Kashmir. It is located on the western edge of Dal Lake. It was called Nehru Park post office before 2011. The place will also have a philately museum. Postcards can be bought from Ghat No. 1, Budiyar Chowk, and the floating Post Office puts a postage stamp on it.

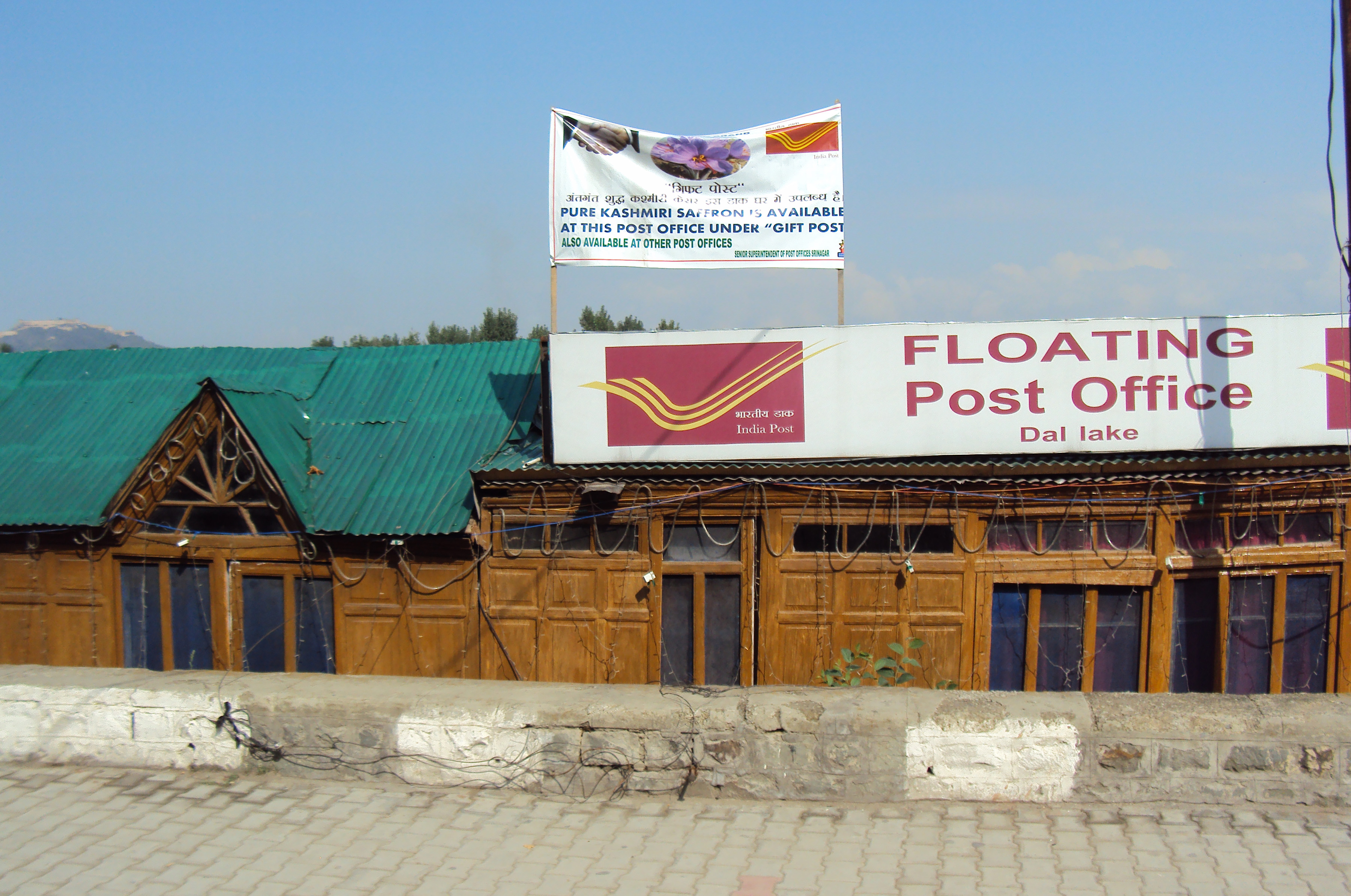
Floating Post Office - Dal Lake - Srinagar- Jammu and Kashmir

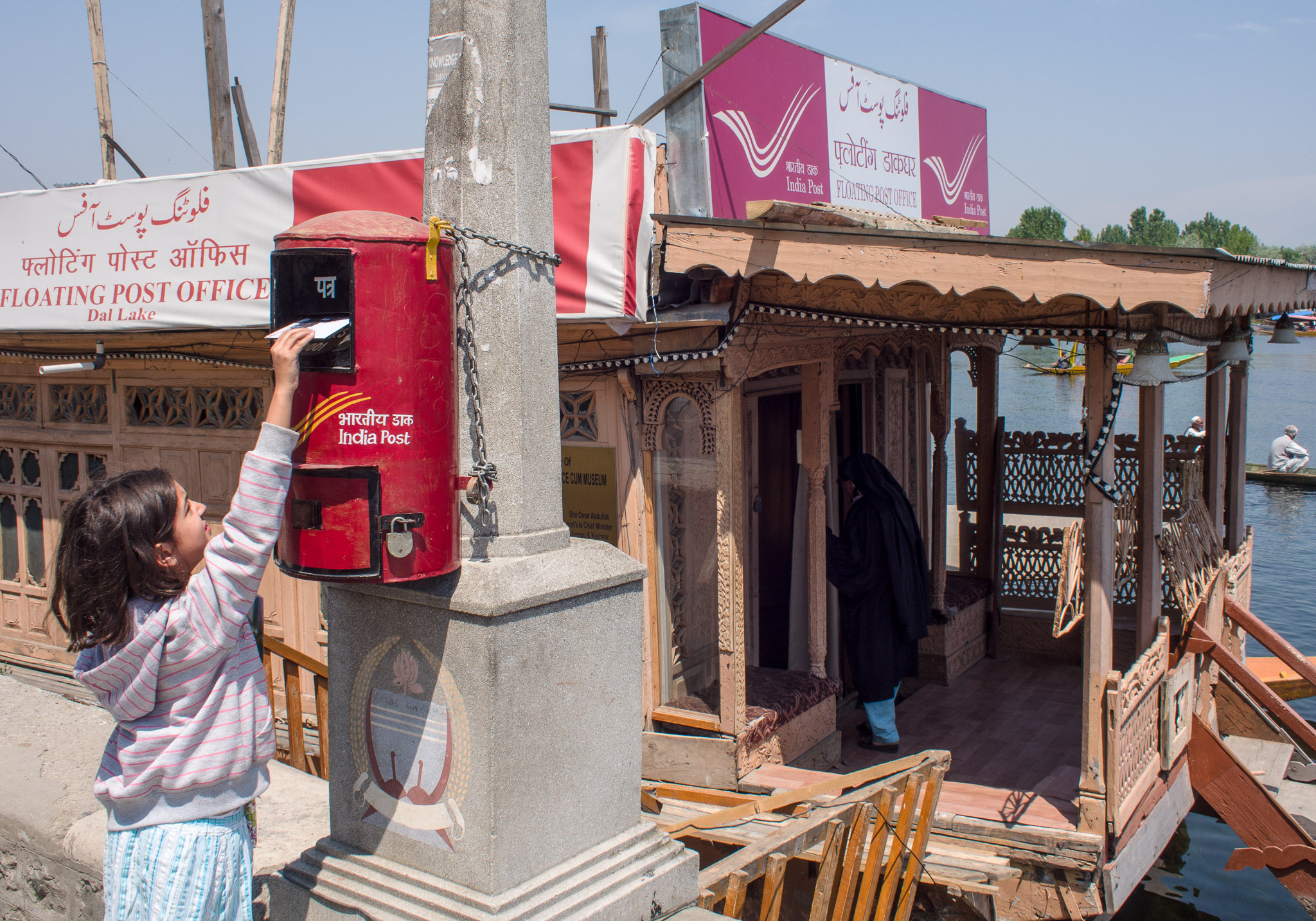
A girl posting a Postcard

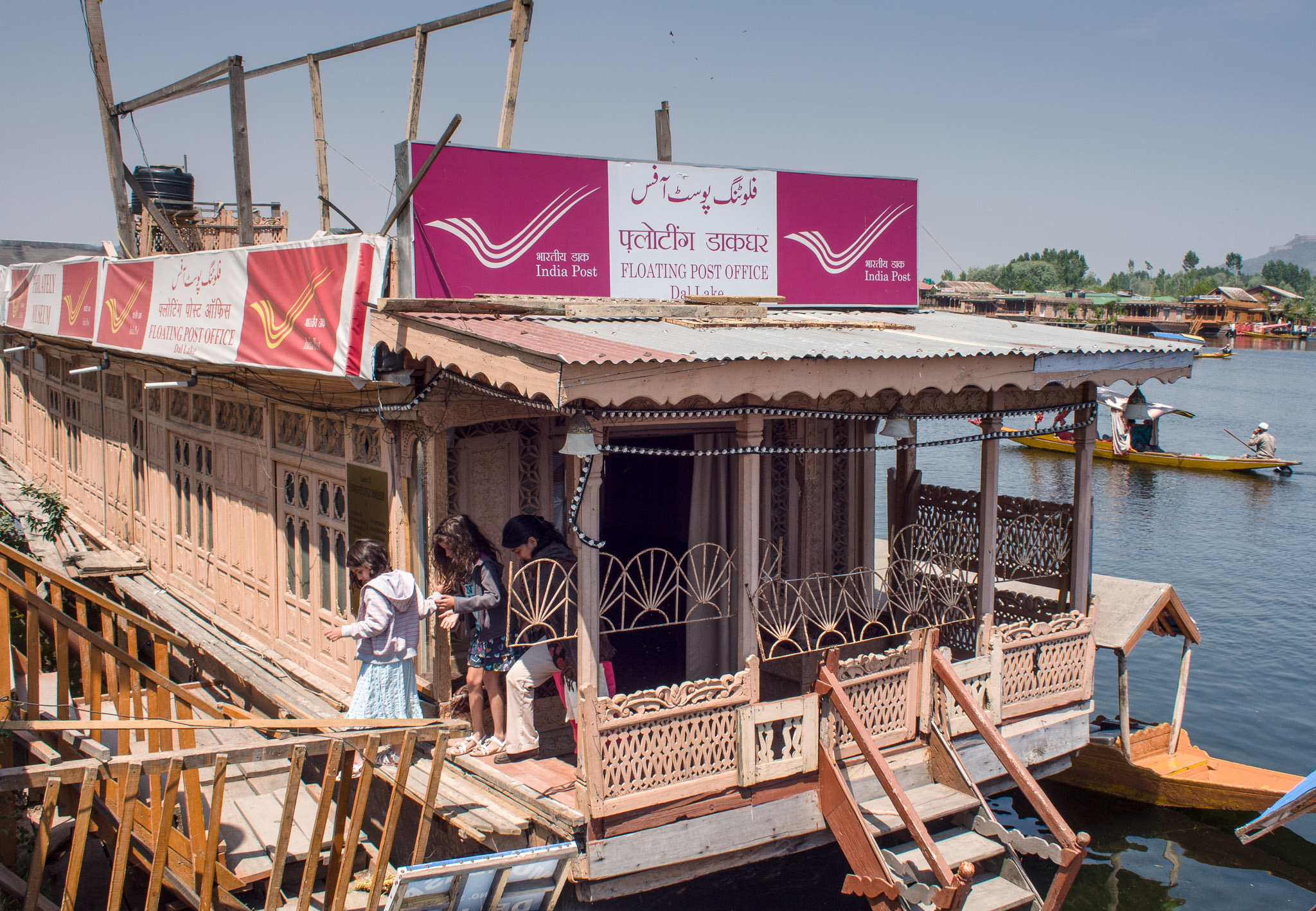
Floating Post Office, Dal Lake

"Dal Pari," a floating Mobile Medical Unit was started by Borderless World Foundation. This service started in the year 2023.

== Transport connections ==
Dal lake is engulfed in three directions by the foreshore and boulevard roads, which stretch along its banks and are dotted with several ghats. Shikaras act as water taxis to navigate within the Dal and can be hired from these ghats. The Dal lies within Srinagar and thus is well connected by road and air links. The nearest airport, which connects with other major cities in the country, is about 12.8 kilometres (8.0 mi) away at Badgam. The nearest railway station is Srinagar railway station which is 18.8 kilometres (11.7 mi) from Dal Lake. The National Highway NH1A connects the Kashmir valley with rest of the country.

== Legacy ==
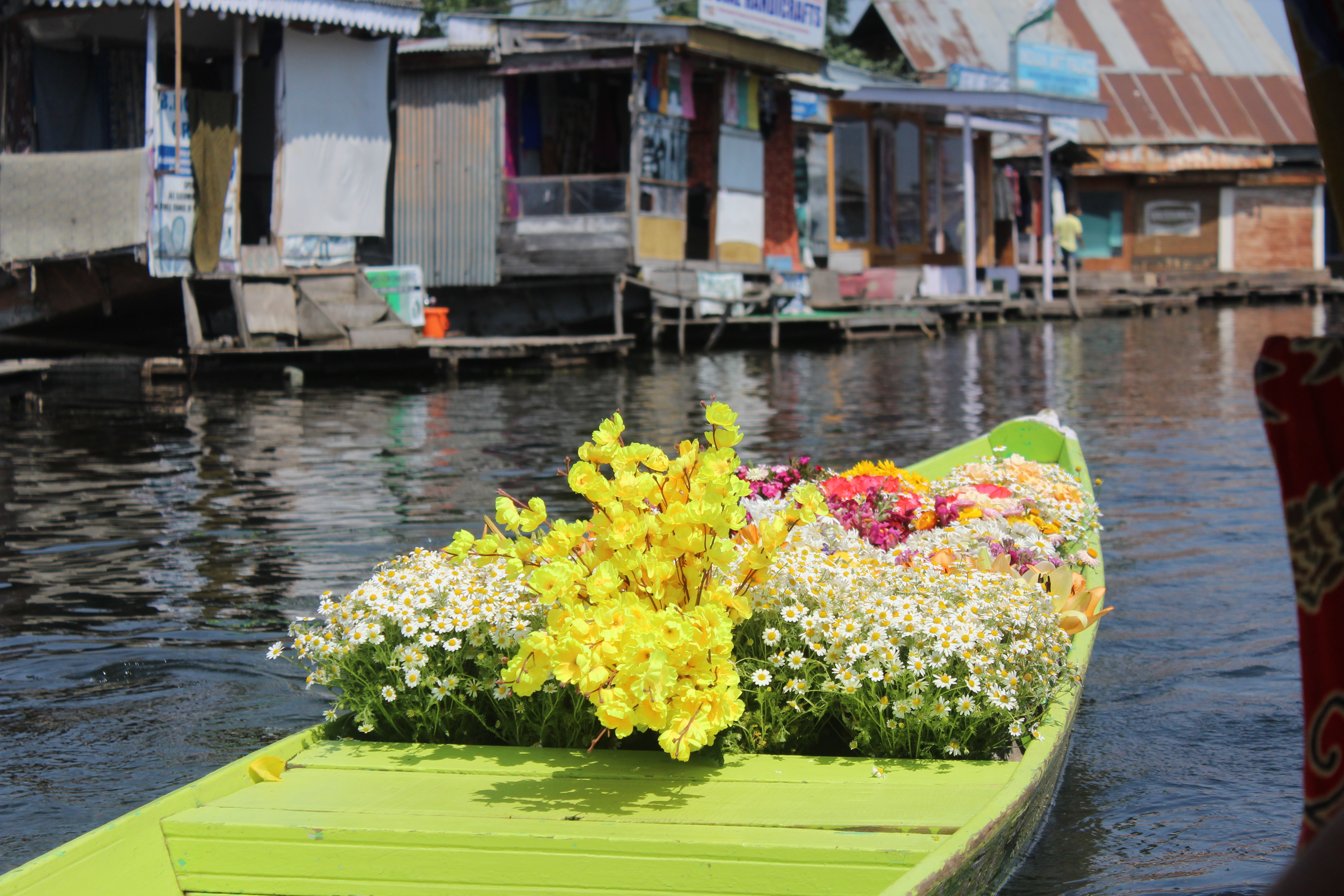
Dal Lake on a usual Afternoon

Salman Rushdie's Dull lake in his novel Haroun and the Sea of Stories is a reference to the Dal lake.

The scene depicting sexual intimacy between Musa and his girlfriend Tilo in Arundhati Roy's The Ministry of Utmost Happiness, takes place on a houseboat on the Dal lake.

"Dupte Nunem," one of the famous songs of Aadil Gurezi, refers to the breeze of Dal lake.

== See also ==
- Nigeen Lake
- Gadsar Lake
- Gangabal Lake
- Manasbal Lake
- Wular Lake
- Anchar Lake
- Khanpursar
- Aharbal
- Hazratbal Shrine
- Khushal Sar
- Gilsar
- Gulmarg
- Gurez
- Jammu–Baramulla line
- Hokersar
