= Nigeen Lake =

Lake in Srinagar, Jammu and Kashmir, India

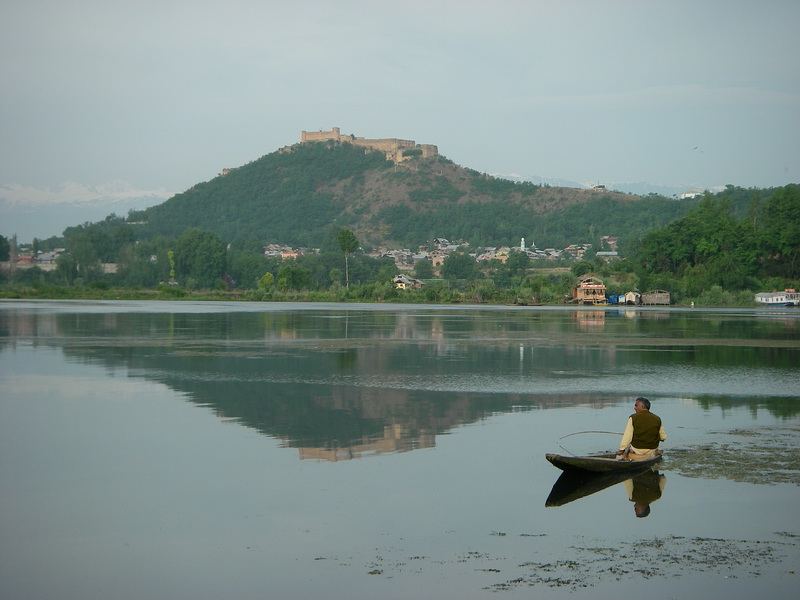
- Nigeen lake and Hari Parbat hill in the background

- Location within Jammu and Kashmir
- Location: Srinagar, Jammu and Kashmir, India
- Coordinates: 34°06′50″N 74°49′56″E
- Primary outflows: Nallah Amir Khan
- Basin countries: India
- Max. length: 2.7 km (1.7 mi)
- Max. width: 0.82 km (0.51 mi)
- Surface elevation: 1,582 m (5,190 ft)

Nigeen Lake (alternatively spelled as Nageen Lake) is a lake located in Srinagar, Jammu and Kashmir, India. It is mildly eutrophic, a term that refers to a body of water rich in nutrients, which cause excessive growth of aquatic plants like algae, resulting in bacteria that consume nearly all the oxygen. It is sometimes considered a part of Dal Lake and is connected to it via a narrow strait. It is also connected to the Khushal Sar and Gil Sar lakes via a channel known as Nallah Amir Khan.

== Etymology ==
The Nigeen lake is surrounded by a large number of willow and poplar trees. Hence, it has come to be referred as a "nageena", which means "the jewel in the ring". The word "nigeen" is a local variant of the same word.

== Location ==
The lake is located adjacent to the Hari Parbat hillock, to the west of the Dal lake. To its north and west, lie the localities of Baghwanpora and Lal Bazar while to its north east lies the locality of Hazratbal, which is known for the Hazratbal Shrine.

== Present status ==
The lake is a major tourist attraction in Srinagar, known for its relatively pristine waters as compared to the Dal lake. Houseboats and shikaras are common. It is also used for swimming. The colonial era Nigeen Club is situated on the eastern shore.

As with other water bodies in the Kashmir Valley the lake suffers from encroachments which are deteriorating its water quality and also increasing the risk of floods. The government of Jammu and Kashmir is taking steps to help improve the condition of the lake and restore it to its original condition.

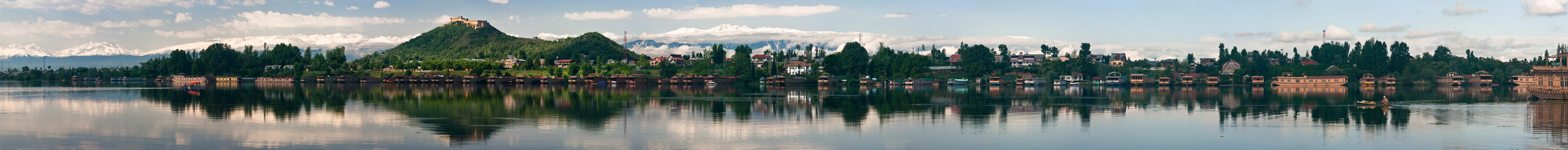
Panoramic view of the houseboat-lined west bank of Nigeen Lake with Hari Parbat in the left foreground and snow-capped Pir Panjal Range in the background.
