= Khushal Sar =

Lake in Jammu and Kashmir, India

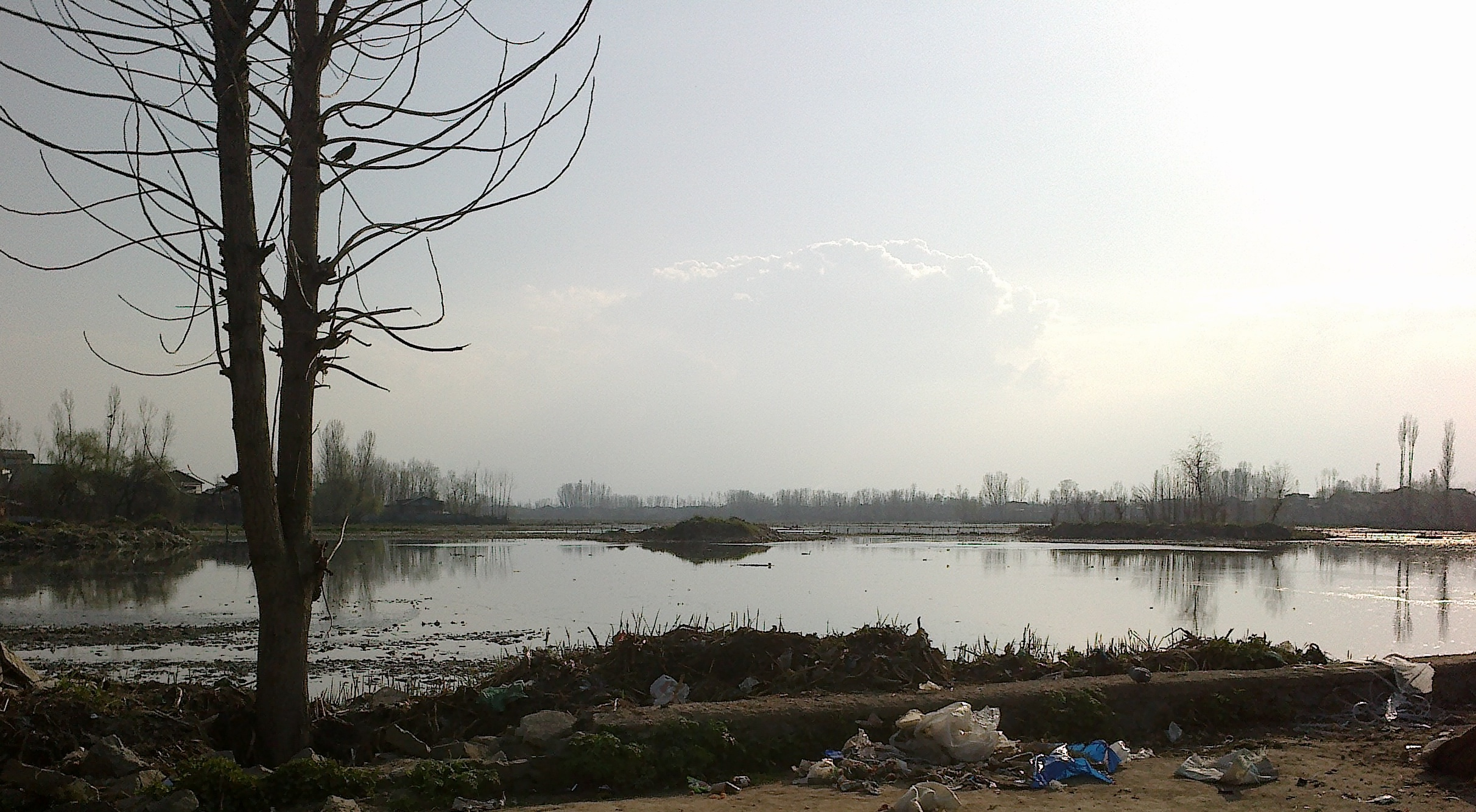
- A view of the Khushal Sar from its Northern Shore

- Location within Jammu and Kashmir
- Location: Srinagar, Jammu and Kashmir
- Coordinates: 34°06′41.34″N 74°47′58″E
- Primary outflows: Channel to the Anchar Lake
- Max. length: 1.6 km (0.99 mi)
- Max. width: 0.6 km (0.37 mi)
- Surface elevation: 1,582 m (5,190 ft)

Khushal Sar (Urdu pronunciation: [xʊʃɦɑːl səɾ] ; Kashmiri pronunciation: [xɔʃhaːl sar]) is a lake located in Srinagar, Jammu and Kashmir, India. It is in a highly deteriorated condition and has been encroached upon at many places with illegal construction and landfilling. The lake once stretched from Zoonimar up to the Aali Masjid but now it is considerably reduced. It is connected to the Anchar lake via a small channel. Another smaller lake, known as Gilsar, is connected to the Khushal Sar via a narrow strait, which is spanned by a bridge known as Gil Kadal. The Gilsar lake is in turn connected to the Nigeen lake via the Nallah Amir Khan. Until the 1970s, the Mar Canal drained into this lake providing navigability up to Ganderbal via the Anchar lake. After the filling up of the Mar Canal, the condition of the lake deteriorated further.
