= Gil Sar =

Lake in Srinagar, Jammu and Kashmir, India

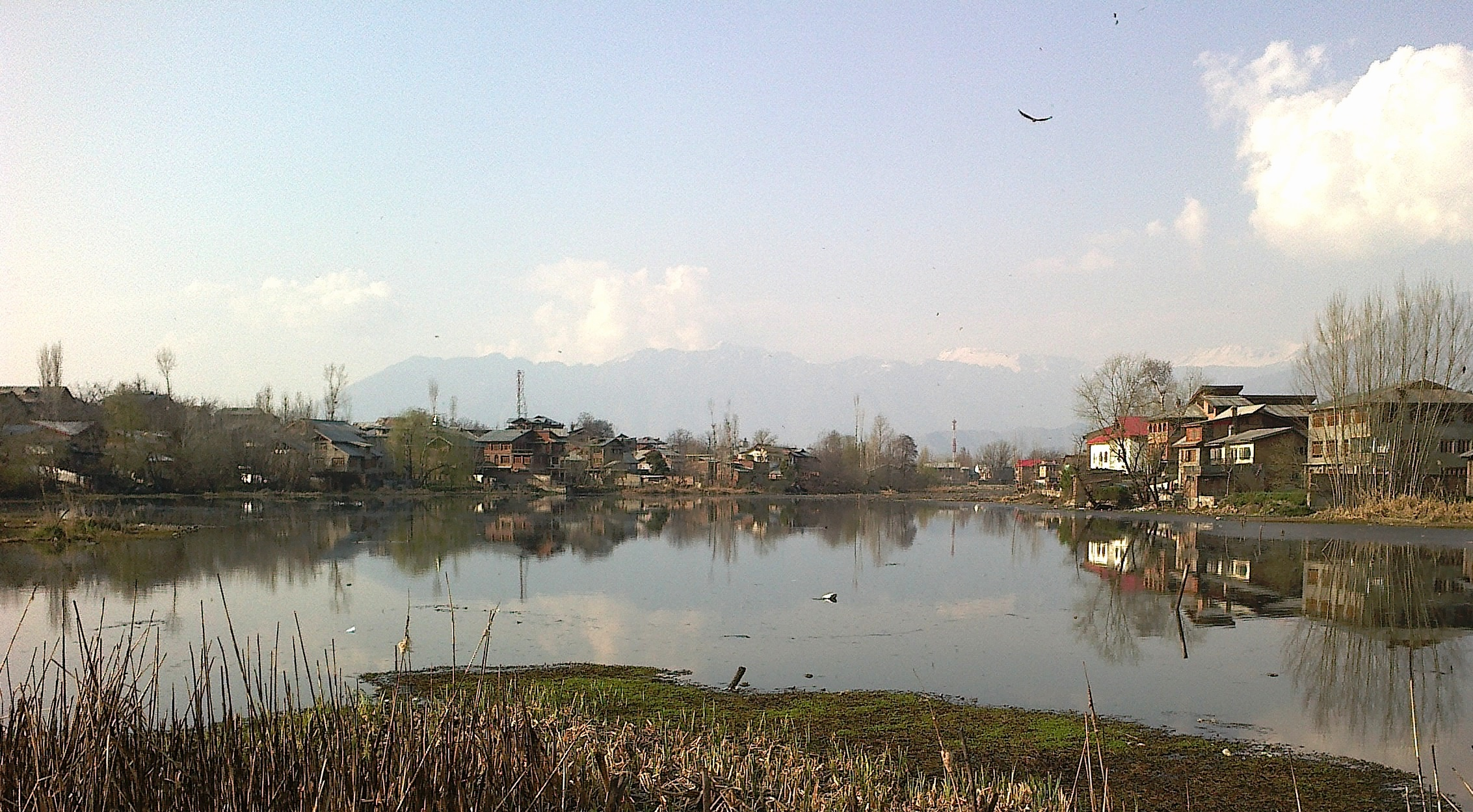
- A view of the Gil Sar from its Southern End near Gil Kadal

- Location within Jammu and Kashmir
- Location: Srinagar, Jammu and Kashmir, India
- Coordinates: 34°07′22″N 74°48′11″E
- Primary outflows: Narrow strait connecting to Khushal Sar
- Basin countries: India
- Max. length: ~0.6 km (2,000 ft)
- Max. width: ~0.2 km (660 ft)
- Surface elevation: 1,582 m (5,190 ft)

Gil Sar (IPA: /ɡilʲ/ /sar/) is a lake located in Srinagar, Jammu and Kashmir, India. The lake is named after Moorhen which is called Gil in Kashmiri language. It is in a highly deteriorated condition due to encroachment. The lake is sometimes considered a part of the Khushal Sar lake but is separated from it by a narrow strait, which is spanned by a bridge known as Gil Kadal. The Gilsar lake is connected to the Nigeen lake via the Nallah Amir Khan.
