= Great Lakes Trek =

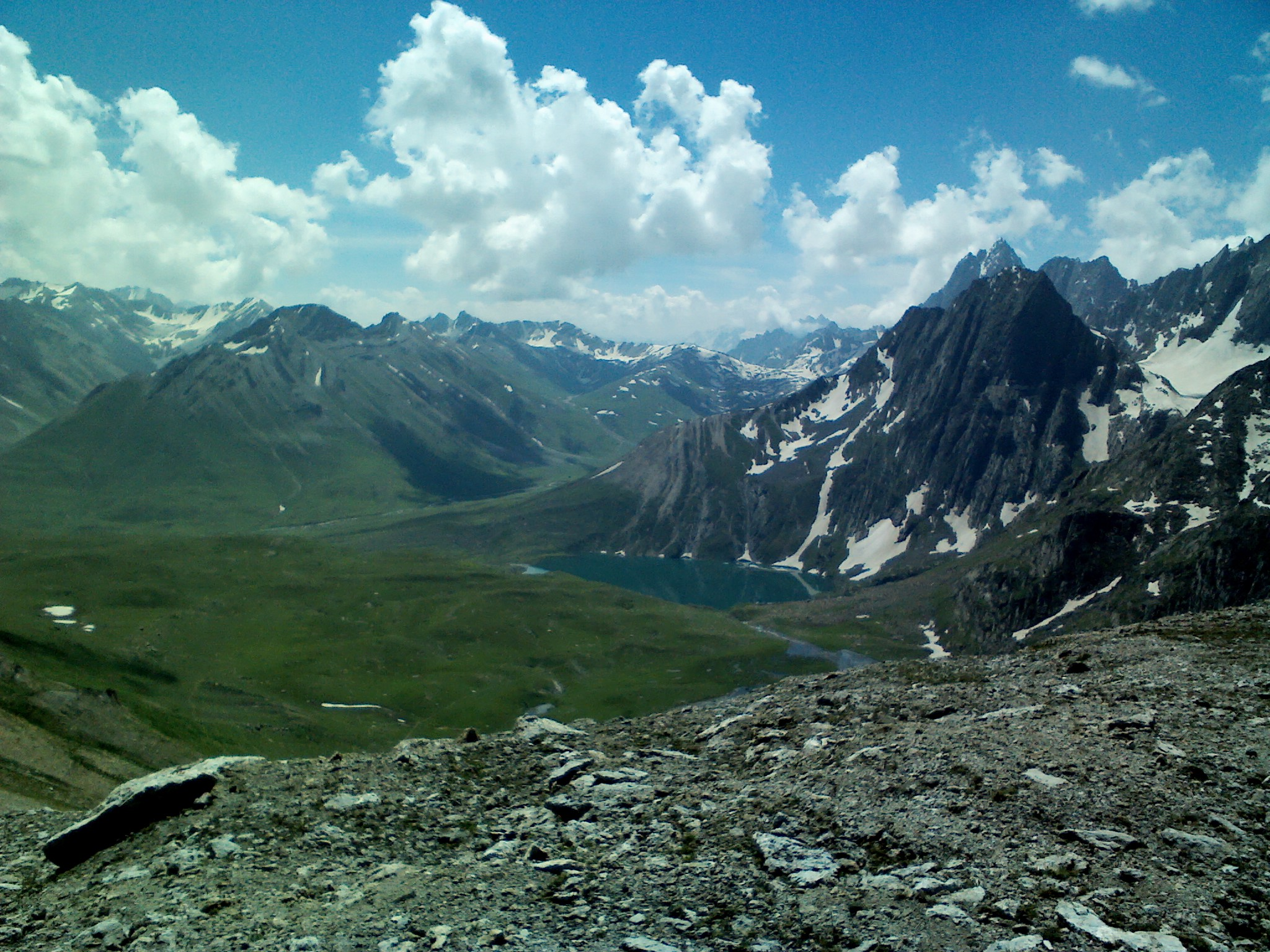
- Twin lakes of Vishansar and Krishansar seen from Gadsar Pass.
- Length: Approx. 42 miles (68 km)
- Location: Central Kashmir Valley
- Designation: Kashmir Great Lakes Trek
- Trailheads: East: Sonamarg; West: Naranag
- Use: Hiking
- Highest point: Gadsar Pass, 13,750 ft (4,190 m)
- Lowest point: Naranag, 6,982 ft (2,128 m)
- Difficulty: Moderate
- Season: June to September
- Sights: Vishansar Lake, Krishansar Lake, Gadsar Lake, Satsar Lakes, Gangabal Lake, Nundkol Lake
- Hazards: Cold nights Warm sunny days Occasional rainfall

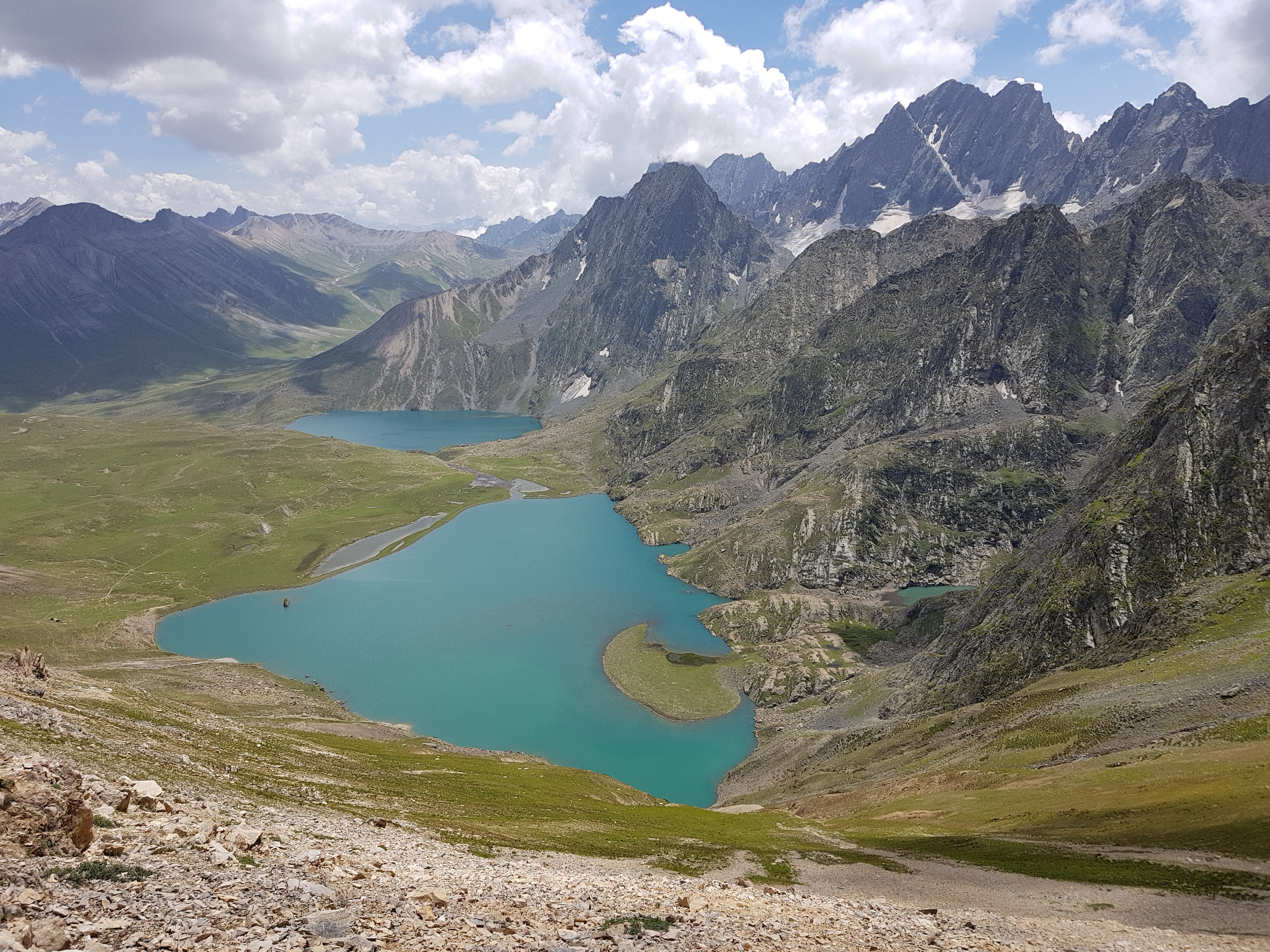
View of the twin lakes of Vishansar and Kishansar clicked from Gadsar pass.

The Great Lakes Trek or Kashmir Great Lakes Trek commercially known as Sonamarg-Vishansar-Naranag Trek is an alpine himalayan high-altitude trek in the Kashmir Valley in the Indian state of Jammu and Kashmir. This is the most famous trek in Kashmir. The trek is usually completed in 6-7 days and is rated as moderate-difficult in terms of terrain and trail difficulty. On the trek, hikers can expect to see alpine lakes, mountain peaks, passes, meadows and glaciers with regularity.

== Itinerary ==
The trek can be started from both Sonamarg and Naranag but is generally considered easier if started from Sonamarg. When starting from Sonamarg, hikers typically set up a base camp at a place called "table top" or "Shaukdari", which is a 6-7 hour trek from the point where hikers are dropped off by vehicles. This is considered a good spot for a base camp as it is inhabited by the local Gujjar-Bakarwal population and there is plenty of firewood available.

The second day is a long trek to the twin lakes of Vishansar-Kishansar via the Nichnai pass. There is a possibility of finding cellular reception at the pass on the BSNL Mobile network.
