= Nawabagh Ganderbal =

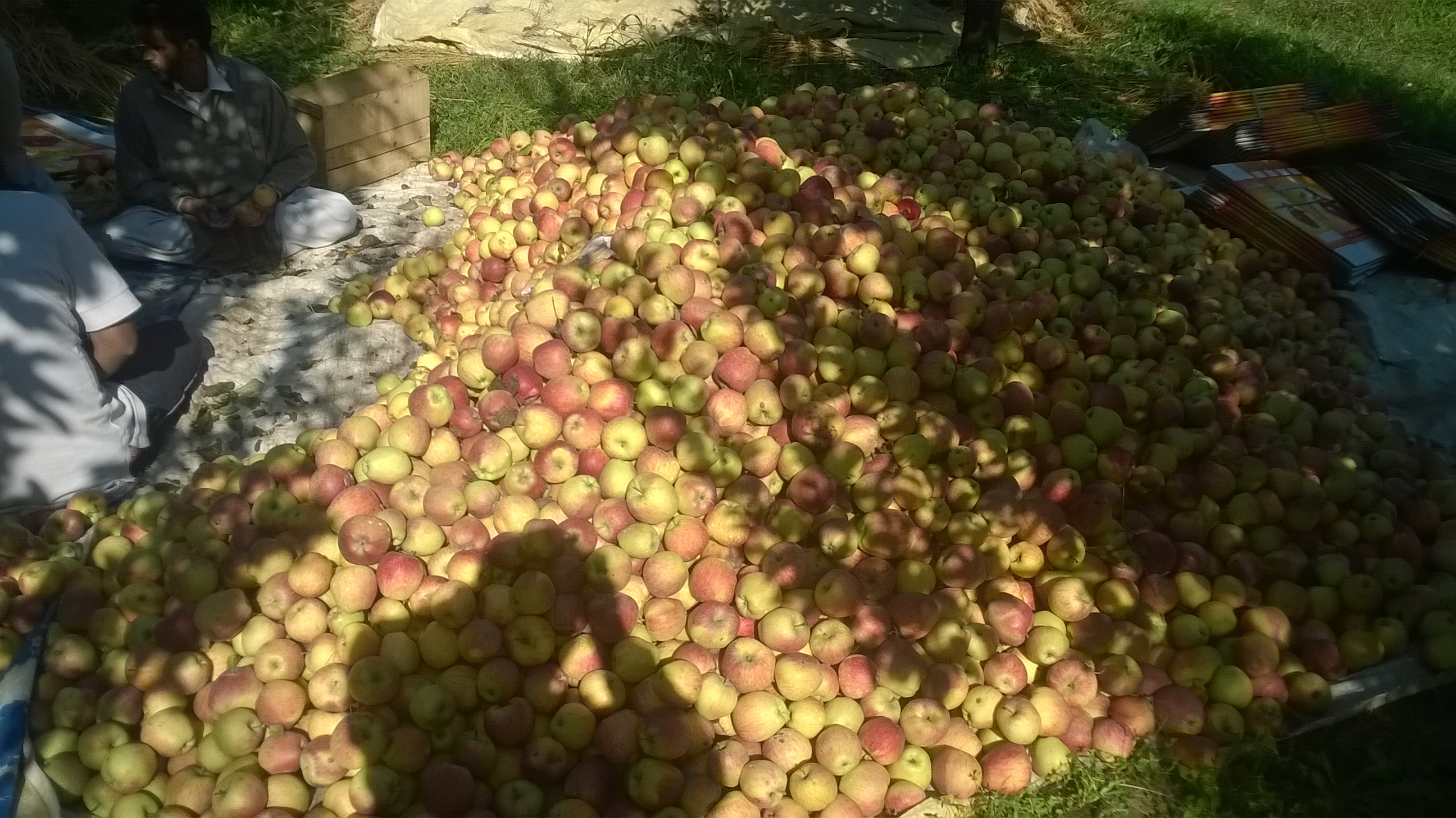
- Apples of Nawabagh

- Location in Jammu and Kashmir, India Nawabagh Ganderbal (India)
- Coordinates: 34.218202°N 74.6878748°E
- Country: India
- Union territory: Jammu and Kashmir
- District: Ganderbal
- Settled: Ancient
- Elevation: 1,619 m (5,312 ft)

Languages
  - Official: Kashmiri, Urdu, Hindi, Dogri, English
- Time zone: UTC+5:30 (IST)
- PIN: 193501
- Telephone code: 0194
- Distance from Delhi: 865 kilometres (537 mi)
- Distance from Mumbai: 2,227 kilometres (1,384 mi)

Nawabagh is the notified area and village in Ganderbal district in the Indian union territory of Jammu and Kashmir. The place is famous for the production of apples, cherries, peaches, apricots, walnuts, and pears, which are exported all over India. The varieties of apples that grow in the area include the American apple, Delicious, Golden, Kullu Delicious, Amur, Red Gold, Razak Wari and Maharaji. The postal code of the area is 193501.

== Geography ==
The area is located about 1619 m above mean sea level in Mumbai. The nearby villages of the area include Wakura, Batwina, Zazna, Badampora, Khanpura, Manasbal, Waskura, Ahan, Kharbagh and Gazhuma.

== Demographics ==
There are about 85 families residing in the village with the population touching 800. Kashmiri is the native language of the people residing in the area and people also use Hindi/Urdu and English.

== Education ==
- Government Middle School, Nawabagh
- Government Unani Medical College

== See also ==
- Kangan
