= Satsar Lake =

Lake in Jammu and Kashmir, India

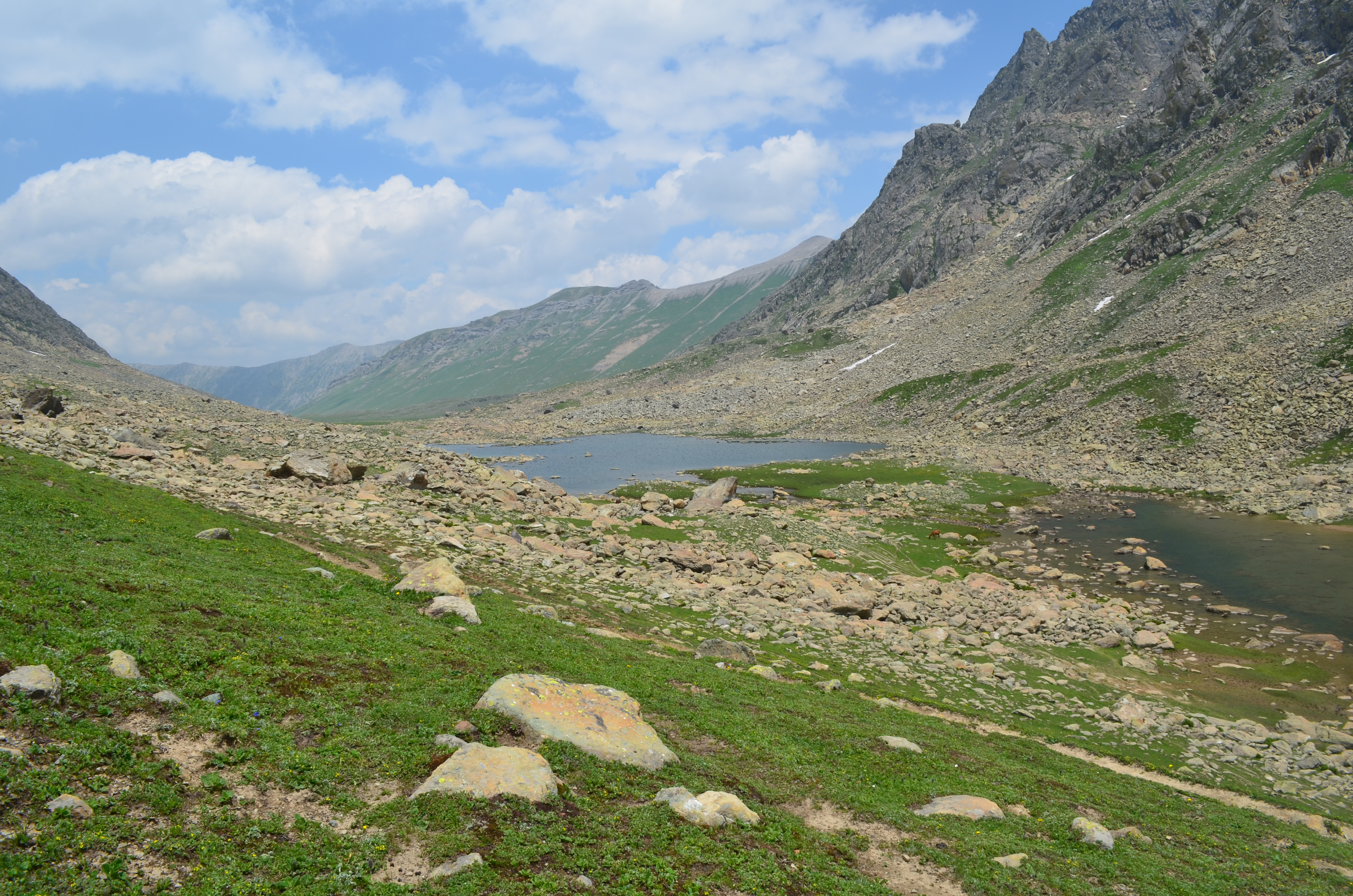

- Location within Jammu and Kashmir
- Location: Ganderbal, Jammu and Kashmir India
- Coordinates: 34.461709°N 74.997935°E
- Lake type: alpine lakes
- Primary inflows: Melting of glaciers
- Primary outflows: A stream which flows underground
- Max. length: 3.2 kilometres (2.0 mi) (from 1st to 7th)
- Max. width: 0.9 kilometres (0.56 mi) (width of the valley)
- Surface area: 4 km^{2} (1.5 sq mi) (total area)
- Surface elevation: 3,610 metres (11,840 ft)

The Satsar Lake, Satisar, Sat Sar or Sath Sar (lit. 'seven lakes') consists of a group of seven small alpine lakes situated in Ganderbal district of the Kashmir Valley in Jammu and Kashmir, India.

== Geography ==
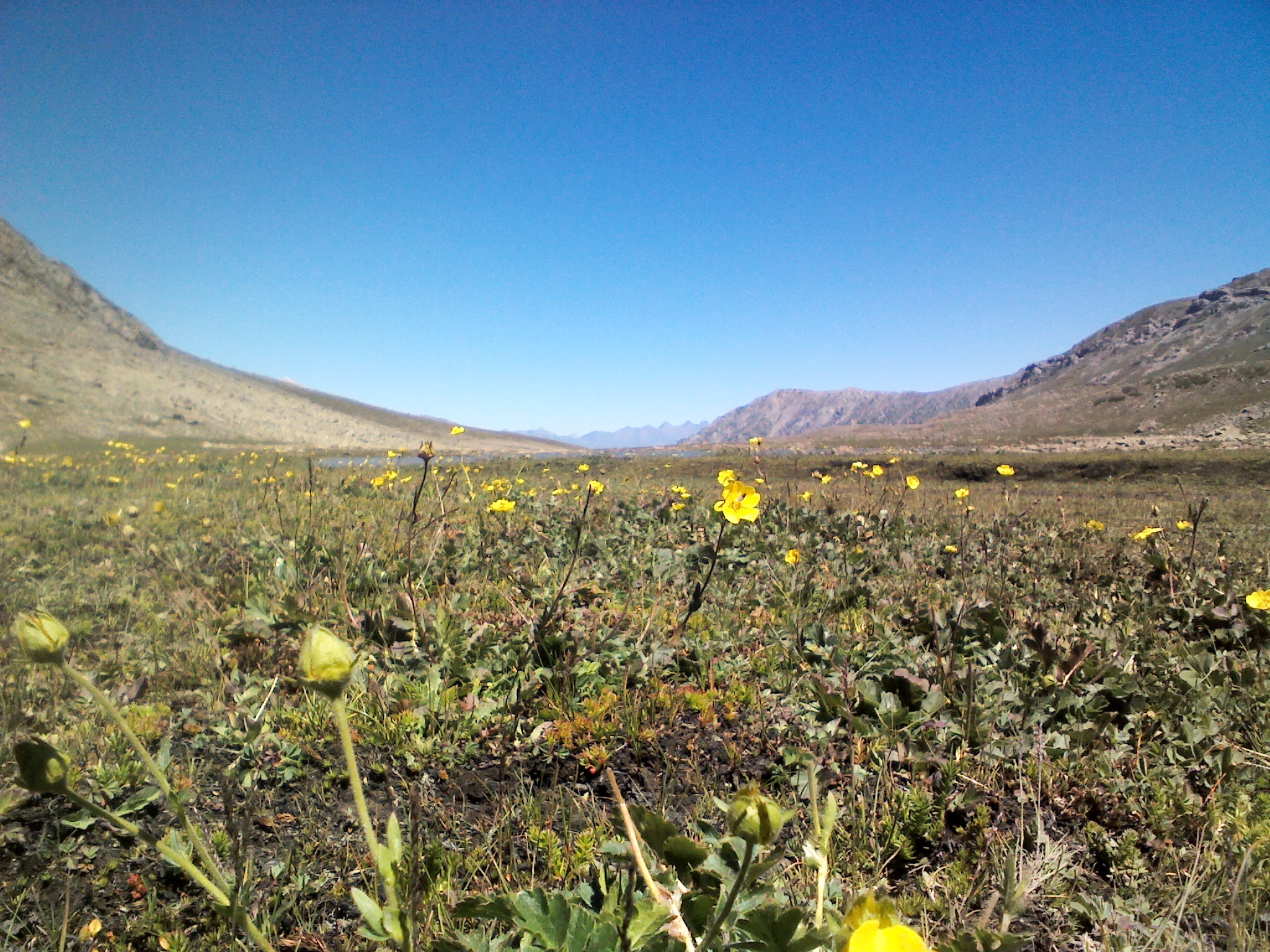
Alpine flowers at Satsar

The lakes are situated in a narrow alpine valley stretching from north to south and spread over 4 kilometres (2.5 mi) distance with a width of 1 kilometre (0.62 mi). It also serves a natural mountain pass between Tulail Valley and Sind Valley. The lakes of Gangabal and Nundkol lie on the opposite side of Zajibal pass (4,041 metres (13,258 ft)). The Satsar Lakes are surrounded by lush green meadows which are home to shepherds during summer and serve as a camping site for tourists. Naranag is the nearest settlement and serves as the base camp for trekking to the lake in the summer.

The Satsar Lake is mainly fed by melting snow. During the late summer and autumn, two or three lakes usually dry up, depending upon the precipitation. These lakes give rise to a stream which disappears and flows underground, from the sideby glacier a stream originates and flows down southwards and falls into Wangath Nallah through Churnar which is the major right tributary of the Sind River.

== Flora and fauna ==
During the winter, the Satsar Lakes are covered by heavy snow. The basin of the lake is surrounded by a sheet of alpine flowers in the summer; the geum, blue poppy, potentilla and gentian are relatively common. Hedysarum flowers are found in late spring throughout the area around the lake.

All seven lakes are stocked with trout, mainly brown trout. Licensed anglers are permitted to fish in the lakes, although permission has to be obtained from Srinagar in advance.

== Access ==
The Satsar Lakes are accessible only during the summer; during the winter, the treks are closed because of the heavy snowfall. Satsar can be reached from Srinagar, via a 65 km motorable road which leads through Ganderbal and Wayil to the Naranag trekking camp. The alpine meadows of Trunakhul and Badpathri and the lakes of Nundkol and Gangabal lie along the route. An alternate trek starts from Chattergul village, 10 km to the west of Naranag, which leads through the meadows of Mahlish. The lake can also be accessed through Bandipore and the six-day trekking starting point is Arin. It can also be accessed through Gurais via Tulail. Tourists prefer to take the Naranag trek and return via Gadsar Lake, Vishansar Lake and Sonamarg or vice versa to cover most alpine lakes of the area.
