= Zazun =

Zazna Zazun
- Village
- Location in Jammu and Kashmir, India Zazna (India)
- Coordinates: 34.2306°N 74.6861°E
- Country: India
- Union territory: Jammu and Kashmir
- District: Ganderbal

Population
  - Total: 1,700

Languages
  - Official: Kashmiri, Urdu, Hindi, Dogri, English
- Time zone: UTC+5:30 (IST)
- Postal code: 191131

Zazna is a village in Ganderbal district of Jammu and Kashmir, India. The village produces several varieties of apples, including 'Delicious' and 'American'. Zazna lies between a village and a town, and is located on the Srinagar-Leh highway equidistant from Srinagar and Kangan, approximately 25 km from each. There is a fruit and vegetable Mandi in Zazna, where people from surrounding areas sell their fruits. The village also has a playground suitable for cricket, football, and volleyball. Agriculture is the main source of income. The majority of earnings come from apples and other fruits such as cherries, pears, and walnuts. One side of Zazna is bordered by high mountains, which serve as grasslands for cattle grazing.
