= Waskura Lake =

Lake in Jammu and Kashmir, India

- Location of Waskura Lake in Jammu and Kashmir
- Location: Waskura Village, Ganderbal District, Jammu and Kashmir, India
- Coordinates: 34.2191143°N 74.6623567°E
- Type: Freshwater lake
- Primary inflows: Springs
- Surface area: 52.7 ha (130 acres)
- Average depth: 6 m (20 ft)
- Surface elevation: 1,583 m (5,194 ft)

Waskura Lake or Waskura Sar is a rural freshwater lake rested in the scenic landscapes of Kashmir Valley, situated about 13 km west of Ganderbal town in Waskura village of Ganderbal district in Jammu and Kashmir, India. With an altitude of 1590 meters above sea level, the lake lies within the geographical coordinates of 34°-16 N latitude and 74°-39 E longitude. It is closely connected to the right bank of the Jhelum River by a small channel.

== Geography ==
Covering an area of about 52.7 hectares, Waskura Lake is classified as a semi-drainage lake, characterized by having an outflow channel but no inflow channel. It primarily relies on springs within the lake body and its periphery for its water source. The catchment area surrounding the lake comprises fan-shaped projections known as karewa, featuring horizontal beds of fine-grained sand, loam, and sandy clay, interspersed with gravelly conglomerates. The lake's morphology is sub-circular, with a maximum depth of 6 meters and a mean depth of 3.75 meters. Its total volume is estimated at 8.99×10^{5} cubic meters, with a shoreline index of 2.75.

== Usage ==
Waskura Lake serves multiple purposes for the local communities. Aside from the lake being used for recreational purposes, the lake water is utilized for irrigation, fishery, and vegetable cultivation as well. The surrounding area supports agricultural activities, including apple and willow plantations.

== Flora ==
The flora of Waskura Lake includes various aquatic plant species, some of which include:

- Common Reed
- Narrow-leaved Cattail
- Broad-leaved Pondweed
- Yellow Floating Heart
- White Water Lily
- Sacred Lotus
- Water Chestnut
- Shining Pondweed
- Golden Bladderwort
- Stoneworts
- Coon's Tail
- Hydrilla
- Eurasian Water Milfoil

== See also ==
- Manasbal Lake
- Khanpursar
