= Ahansar Lake =

Lake in Jammu and Kashmir, India

- Location of Ahansar Lake in Jammu and Kashmir
- Location: Ahan Village, Ganderbal District, Jammu and Kashmir
- Coordinates: 34°18′N 74°39′E
- Type: Freshwater ox-bow lake
- Primary inflows: Ephemeral channels, underground springs
- Primary outflows: Jehlum River
- Surface area: 0.80 km^{2} (0.31 sq mi)
- Average depth: 4.80 m (15.7 ft)
- Surface elevation: 1,584 m (5,197 ft)

Ahansar Lake is a rural freshwater ox-bow lake located in close vicinity of Manasbal Lake in Ahan village, Ganderbal district, Jammu and Kashmir, India. It is situated approximately 26 kilometers northwest of Srinagar city within the geographical coordinates of 34° 18´ N latitude and 74° 39´ E longitude. The lake is classified as a semi-drainage type with a maximum depth of 4.80 meters and covers an area of 0.80 square kilometers. It is located at an altitude of 1584 meters above sea level.

The lake is characterized by its shallow depth and an extended zone of emergent vegetation along its periphery. Water supply to the lake is maintained by underground springs spread over its basin, supplemented by an ephemeral irrigation channel during the paddy cultivation period. It has a permanent outflow channel on the western side that drains excessive water into the Jehlum River.

== Fish ==
Ahansar Lake supports many species of fish, including:

- Common Carp
- Mirror Carp
- Grass Carp
- Giant Danio
- Crucian Carp
- Black Mahseer
- Sattar Snowtrout
- Rosy Barb
- Mosquitofish

== See also ==
- Manasbal Lake
- Khanpursar
