= Nundkol Lake =

Lake in Ganderbal district, Jammu and Kashmir, India

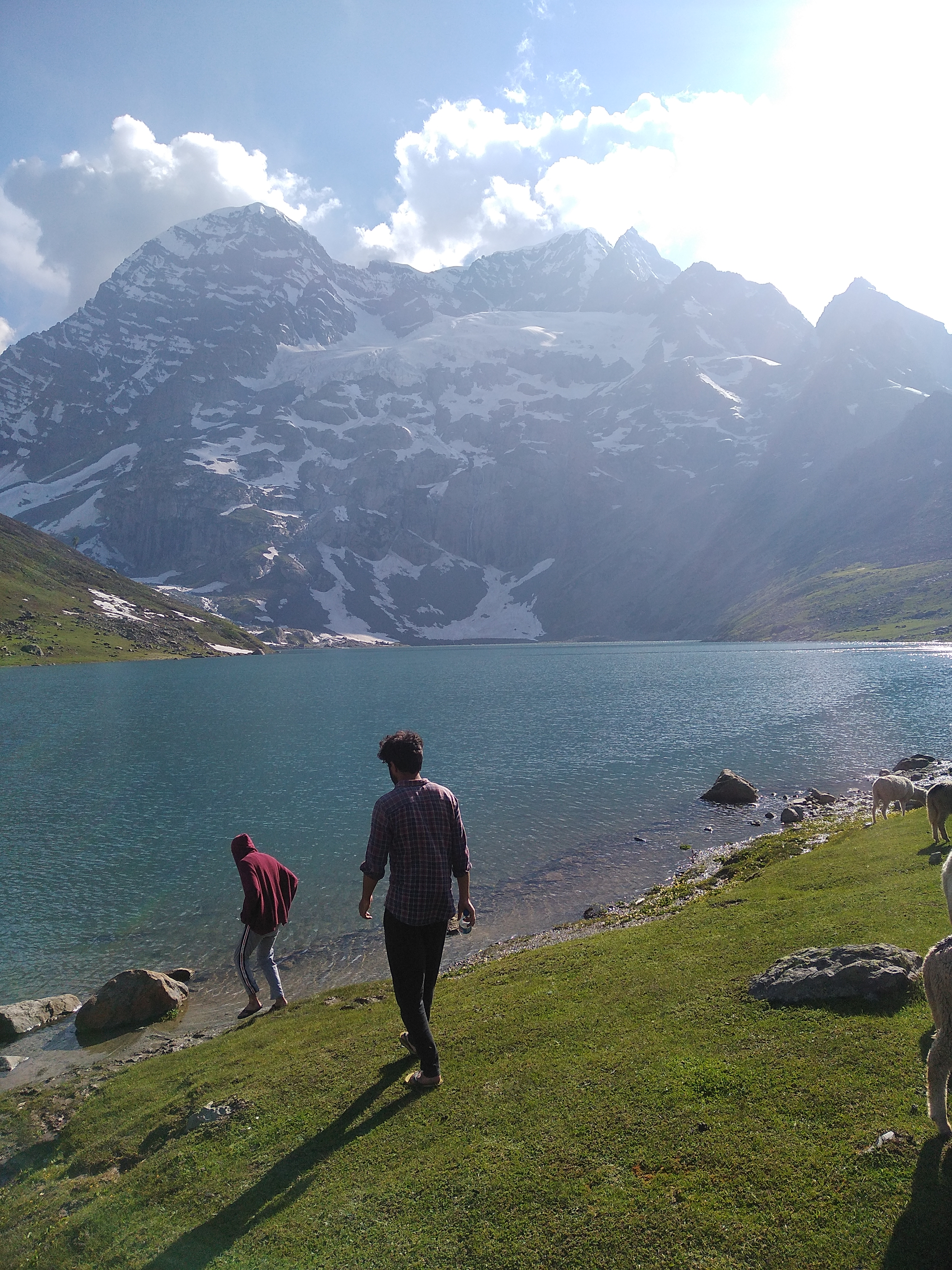

- Location within Jammu and Kashmir
- Location: Ganderbal district, Jammu and Kashmir, India
- Coordinates: 34.417855°N 74.935663°E
- Lake type: oligotrophic lake
- Primary inflows: Gangbal Lake
- Primary outflows: Sind River
- Max. length: 1.2 kilometres (0.75 mi)
- Max. width: 0.5 kilometres (0.31 mi)
- Surface area: 1.5 km^{2} (0.58 sq mi)
- Surface elevation: 3,505 metres (11,499 ft)

The Nundkol Lake or Nund Kol also known as Nandi Kund and Kalodaka Lake is an oligotrophic alpine lake situated in Ganderbal district of the Kashmir Valley in Jammu and Kashmir, India. This lake is considered sacred by Hindus.

== Etymology ==
The lake was originally called Nandi Kund meaning (Lake of Nandi). The term "Nundkol" also means Lake of Nandi. Nandi is the bull vahana of the Hindu god Shiva.

== Geography ==
The Nundkol (left) and Gangabal (right) lakes as seen from Zaj pass, with Harmukh hidden behind clouds.

The Nundkol Lake lies at the foot of Mount Haramukh (5,142 metres (16,870 ft)). The Gangabal Lake which is bigger and at higher elevation lies 1.5 km to the north of the lake. Surrounded by the lush green meadows, the banks of the Nundkol Lake serve as the camping site during the summers. Naranag is the nearest settlement and serves as the base camp for trekking to the lake.

The Nundkol Lake is fed by Gangabal Lake and the melting glaciers of the Mount Haramukh. It gives rise to Wangath Nallah, the major right tributary of the Sind River.

== Religious significance ==
This lake is sacred for Hindus. According to a legend, Nandi was born as son of sage Shilad, who performed a great penance near this lake. Upon penance of Shilad, Shiva took his permanent abode thereby. The inner blue color of lake is believed to mark the presence of Shiva, while the outer light green portion of lake is supposed to mark the presence of Nandi. Shiva is also worshipped with the name Nandisa there.

== Flora and fauna ==
During the winter, Nundkol Lake freezes and is covered by heavy snow. In the summers, the basin of the lake is surrounded by a sheet of alpine flowers. The geum, blue poppy, potentilla and gentian are relatively common. Hedysarum flowers are found in late spring throughout the area around the lake.

The Nundkol Lake is stocked with trout among of which is the brown trout. Fishing is permitted to the licensed anglers.

== Access ==
The Nundkol Lake is accessible only during the summer; during the winter, the treks are closed because of the heavy snowfall. It can be reached from Srinagar, via a 65 km motorable road which leads through Ganderbal and Wayil to the Naranag trekking camp. The alpine meadows of Trunakhul and Badpathri lies at the halfway point of this two-day trek to the lake. An alternate trek starts from Chattergul village, 10 km to the west of Naranag which leads through the meadows of Mahlish. The lake can also be accessed through Bandipora and the five-day trekking starting point is Arin. Tourists prefer Naranag trek and return via Gadsar Lake, Vishansar Lake and Sonamarg to cover most alpine lakes of the area.

== Gallery ==
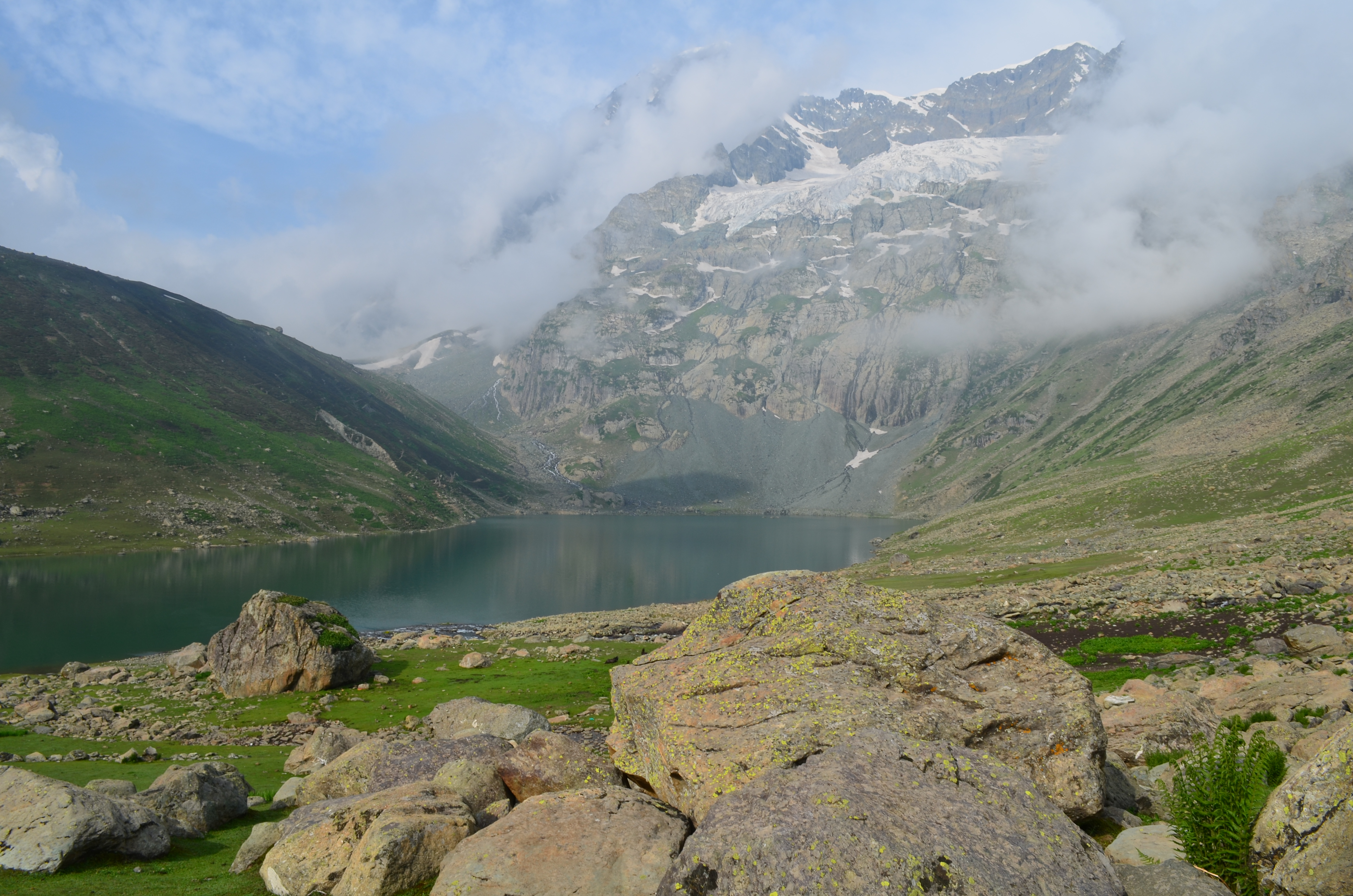
Nundkol Lake, Harmukh at the background

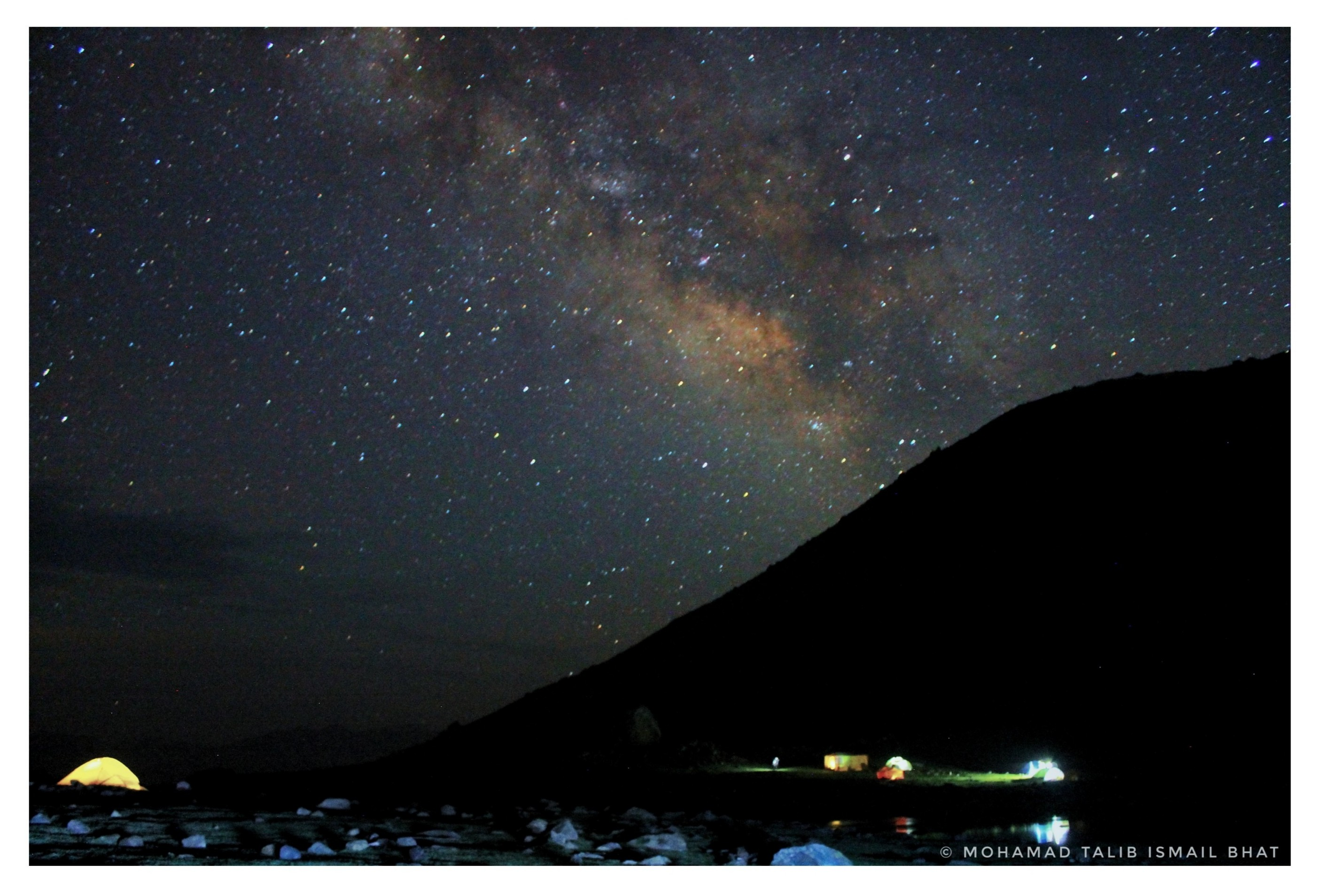
Photograph of Milkyway at Nundkol Lake located in the vicinity of Mt. Harmukh

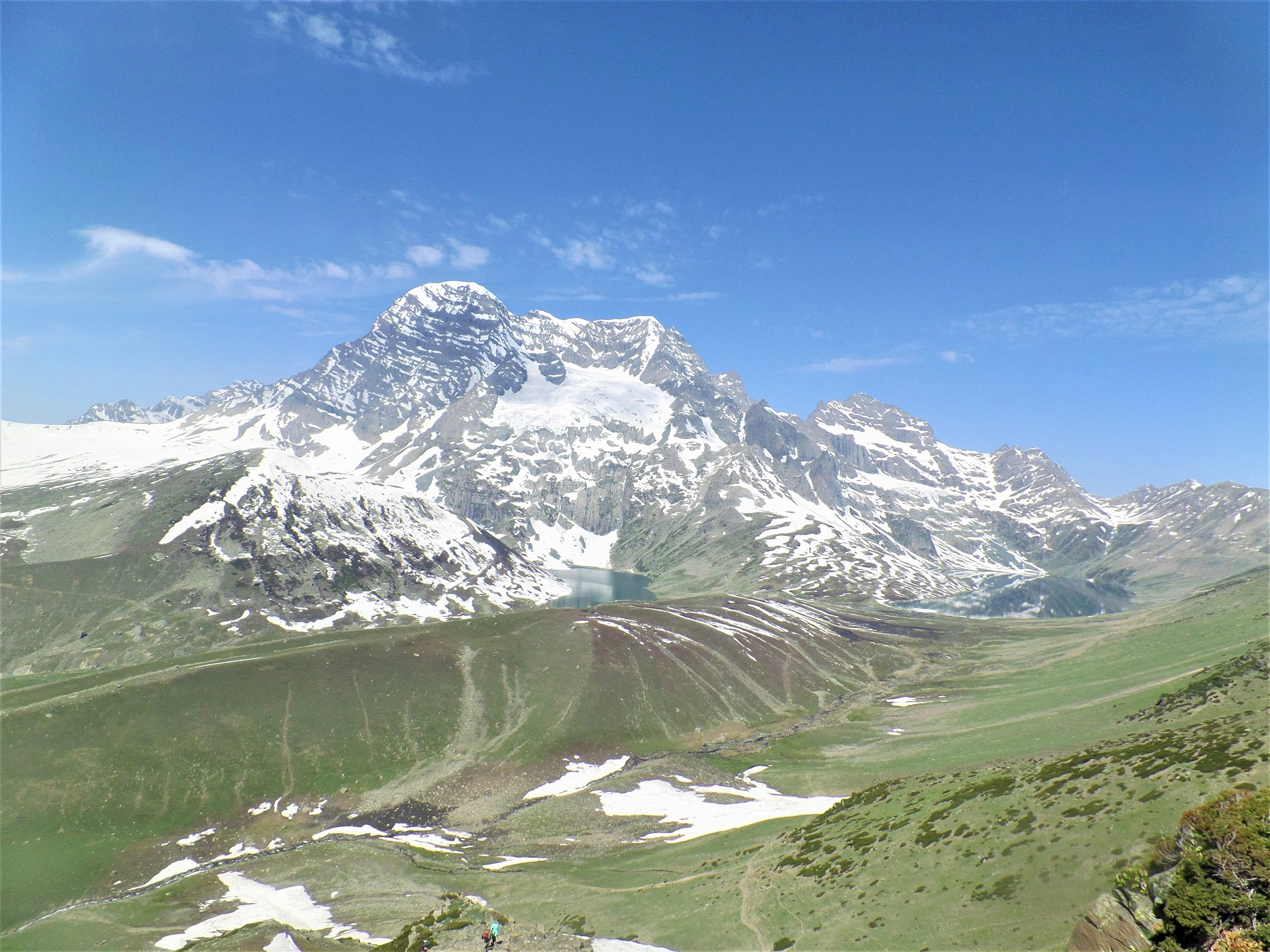
Mount Harmukh rising from Gangabal (right) and Nundkol Lakes (left)
