= Lar, Jammu and Kashmir =

Lar
- Town
- Location in Jammu and Kashmir, India Lar (India)
- Coordinates: 34.262°N 74.755°E
- Country: India
- Union Territory: Jammu and Kashmir
- District: Ganderbal
- Elevation: 1,650 m (5,410 ft)

Population (2011)
  - Total: 50,491

Languages
  - Official: Kashmiri, Urdu, Hindi, Dogri, English
- Time zone: UTC+5:30 (IST)
- PIN: 191131
- Telephone code: 1942419
- Vehicle registration: JK16
- Sex ratio: 951 ♂/♀

Lar is a town and council district in the Ganderbal district of central Kashmir, in Jammu and Kashmir, India in the disputed Kashmir region. It is a relatively newly established tehsil, carved out of the Ganderbal tehsil. It is situated 25 km from the heart of the summer capital, Srinagar, on National Highway (NH 1D) between the foothills of the Himalayan mountains in the north and the picturesque Zabarwan Hills in the south. The Sind River, a major tributary to the Jehlum River flows through Lar. The famous Manasbal Lake lies a few kilometres away from the town centre.

== Geography ==
Lar is located 34.262°N 74.755°E. 6 km north of Ganderbal town and 25 km from the Srinagar center, at an average elevation of 1,650 metres (5,410 ft). The famous Sonamarg hill station is at a distance of 60 km from here. The Sind River, a major tributary of the Jehlum River flows through Lar. The sand (bajri) of this river has a great value and is highly regarded for its quality. Lar produces the world class grape varieties like Hussaini- imported from Iran, Sahibi- imported from Hyderabad, Kishmish, Anabeshai and Ruby.

== Demographics ==
At the 2011 India census, Lar had a population of 50,491 (males 52%, females 48%). The literacy rate was 59.99%, higher than the national average of 59.5%.

== Climate ==
Lar Town possesses all the typical characteristics of the climate of Kashmir Valley as a whole. In the heat of July, the breeze of the Sind River is a welcome relief. Sir Walter Lawrence writes in his book, The Valley of Kashmir, that in latitude, Kashmir corresponds with Peshawar, Baghdad and Damascus in Asia: with Fez in Morocco: and South Carolina in America, but it presents none of the characteristics of those countries. People have linked the climate of Kashmir to that of Switzerland until the end of May, and of Southern France in July and August. But it is impossible to speak of Kashmir as possessing any one climate or group of characteristics. Every hundred feet of elevation brings some new phase of climate and of vegetation.
