= Baba Dariya Din =

Village in Ganderbal district

- Village
- Location in Jammu and Kashmir, India Baba Dariya Din (India)
- Coordinates: 34.2084°N 74.8216°E
- Country: India
- Union Territory: Jammu and Kashmir
- District: Ganderbal

Population (2011)
  - Total: 479

Languages
  - Official: Kashmiri, Urdu, Hindi, Dogri, English
- Time zone: UTC+5:30 (IST)
- Area code: 002937

Baba Dariya Din is a medium size village in Ganderbal district of Jammu and Kashmir, India. It has populace of 479 of which 255 are males while 224 are females according to Population Census 2011.
