= Narayanbagh Lake =

Lake in Jammu and Kashmir, India

- Location of Narayanbagh Lake in Jammu and Kashmir
- Location: Narayanbagh and Dab Villages, Ganderbal District, Jammu and Kashmir, India
- Coordinates: 34.19°N 74.68°E
- Type: Shallow lake
- Primary inflows: Springs
- Surface area: 24.3 ha (60 acres)
- Average depth: 5 m (16 ft)
- Surface elevation: 1,587 m (5,207 ft)

Naryanbagh Lake or Narayanbagh Sar is a shallow lake situated 14 km from Ganderbal town & 30 kilometers from Srinagar city in between the Dab and Narayanbagh villages of Ganderbal district of Jammu and Kashmir, India. Covering an area of 24.3 hectares, it lies at an altitude of 1587 meters. The lake is classified as a semi-drainage type, primarily fed by springs within its basin, and reaches a maximum depth of 5 meters.

== Geography ==
Naraynbagh Lake is located on the floodplain of the river Jhelum. Its water is alkaline, with a pH ranging from 7.6 to 8. The lake is characterized by marl formation, which covers the macrophytic vegetation and basin sediment.

Narayanbagh Lake falls under wetland type 13, characterized by its semi-drainage nature and reliance on spring water for its supply.

== Climate ==
The climate around Naraynbagh Lake exhibits marked seasonal changes, with temperatures fluctuating from -4°C in winter to 32.5°C in summer. Heavy snowfall occurs during the winter months.

== Vegetation ==
The principal vegetation of the lake includes Ceratophyllum and Myriophyllum aquatic species in deeper areas, while Phragmites and Typha reeds typically grow along the lake shore. The aquatic fern Salvinia natans also thrives in the lake's ecosystem.

== See also ==
- Sind River
- Jhelum River
