= Kangan, Jammu and Kashmir =

Kangan
- Town
- Location in Jammu and Kashmir, India Kangan (India)
- Coordinates: 34.263°N 74.903°E
- Country: India
- Union territory: Jammu and Kashmir
- District: Ganderbal
- Elevation: 1,810 m (5,940 ft)

Population (2001)
  - Total: 94,874

Languages
  - Official: Kashmiri, Urdu, Hindi, Dogri, English
- Time zone: UTC+5:30 (IST)
- PIN: 191202
- Telephone code: 1942418
- Vehicle registration: JK16
- Sex ratio: 925 ♂/♀

Kangan is a town located near Ganderbal, in the Ganderbal district of Jammu and Kashmir, India in the disputed Kashmir region. It is one of the tehsils in District Ganderbal. It is situated across the Nallah Sindh and spread over a 50-km-long gorge valley, with population of 120,934 and literacy rate of 52.8% and sex ratio 868 per thousand males. Widely regarded for its beauty, it is surrounded by various picnic spots like Sonamarg and Naranag.

== Etymology ==
The translation, from Hindi, means 'bracelet' and is believed that this is derived from the town's location; being surrounded by mountains on all sides.

== Geography ==
Kangan is located at 34.263°N 74.903°E. It has an average elevation of 1,810 metres (5,940 ft) above mean sea level.

== Demographics ==
As of 2001 India census, Kangan had a population of 94874 males constitute 52% of the population and females 48%. Kangan has an average literacy rate of 32.22% lower than the national average of 59.5%: male literacy is 42.67%, and female literacy is 20.47%.

== See also ==
- Wakura
