= Wayil, Jammu and Kashmir =

Wayil
- village
- Location within Jammu and Kashmir
- Coordinates: 34°16′15″N 74°48′10″E
- State: Jammu and Kashmir
- District: Ganderbal
- Community development block in India: Ganderbal
- Elevation: 1,678 m (5,505 ft)

Languages
  - Official: Kashmiri, Urdu, Hindi, Dogri, English
- Time zone: UTC+5:30 (IST)
- Postal Index Number: 191201
- Vehicle registration: JK16

Wayil is a tourist village in the Ganderbal District of Jammu and Kashmir, India. It is located on the bank of Sind River, around 9 km from Ganderbal, 30 km northeast from Srinagar, at NH 1D which connects Srinagar and Ladakh.

== Tourism ==
Wayil village is a picnic spot known for its scenery, covered with the green mountains on the bank of Sind River. It is popular among the tourists for its peaceful environment and it is only one hour drive away from the Srinagar City.

The village is a base camp for trekkers to the alpine meadows of Mohanmarg and Laarmarg. It is also holds a suspension bridge (18 meters) over Sind River. A number of restaurants and huts are available for boarding and lodging. The most common tourist activities include fishing of trout. Apart from this Wayil serves as a place for swimming for young people because of two river channels flowing there.
