= Khanpursar =

Lake in Jammu and Kashmir, India

Khanpursar Lake
- Location of Khanpursar lake in Jammu and Kashmir
- Location: Khanpur Village, Ganderbal, Jammu and Kashmir
- Coordinates: 34°12′22″N 74°40′33″E
- Type: Holomictic lake
- Primary inflows: Ephemeral channels
- Primary outflows: Jehlum River
- Max. length: 0.28 mi (0.45 km)
- Max. width: .19 mi (0.31 km)
- Surface area: 16.8 acres (0.0 sq mi; 0.1 km^{2})
- Average depth: 13 ft (4.0 m)
- Surface elevation: 5,184 ft (1,580 m)

Khanpursar Lake is a shallow, non-mictic lake, near Ganderbal town in the Ganderbal district of Jammu and Kashmir in India. It lies 24 km north-west of Srinagar city in the village of Khanpur on the right bank of the Jehlum River. The famous Manasbal Lake lies 6 km in the north.

Khanpursar Lake is fed by springs and a few ephemeral channels and outflows into Jehlum River. The lake is mostly an oval shaped lake with a length of 400 meters and breadth of 300 meters. It has a maximum depth of 4 meters. Willow plantations and paddy cultivations are a part of its catchment area. Khanpursar is surrounded by a few villages. Khanpur village lies on the eastern side, while as Batpora and Guzhama lie on the southern and north-western sides, respectively. The lake is an important source of fish and the lotus stem.

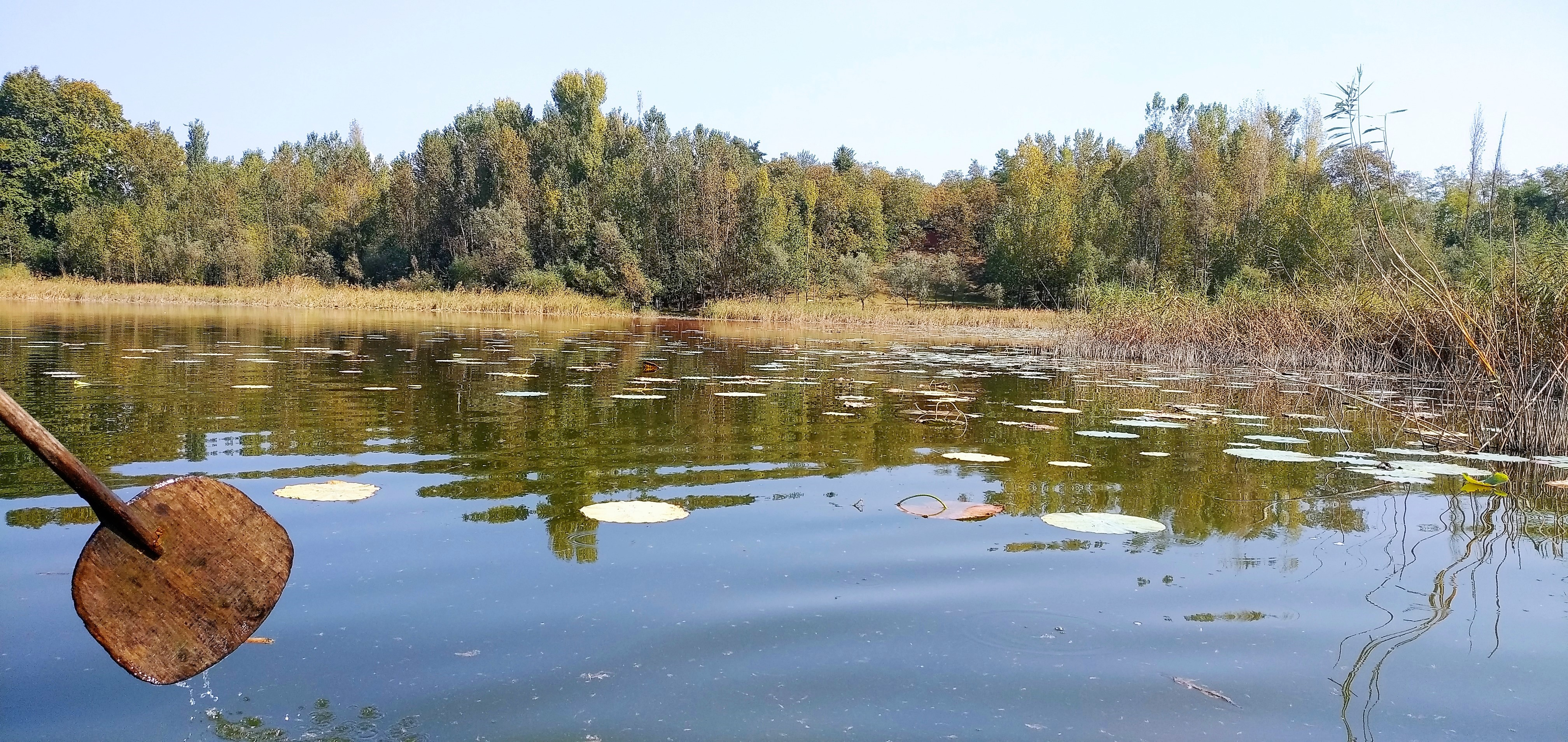
Khanpursar Lake

== See also ==
- Nigeen Lake
- Nundkol Lake
- Manasbal Lake
- Wular Lake
- Gangbal Lake
