= Harmukh =

Mountain in Jammu and Kashmir, India

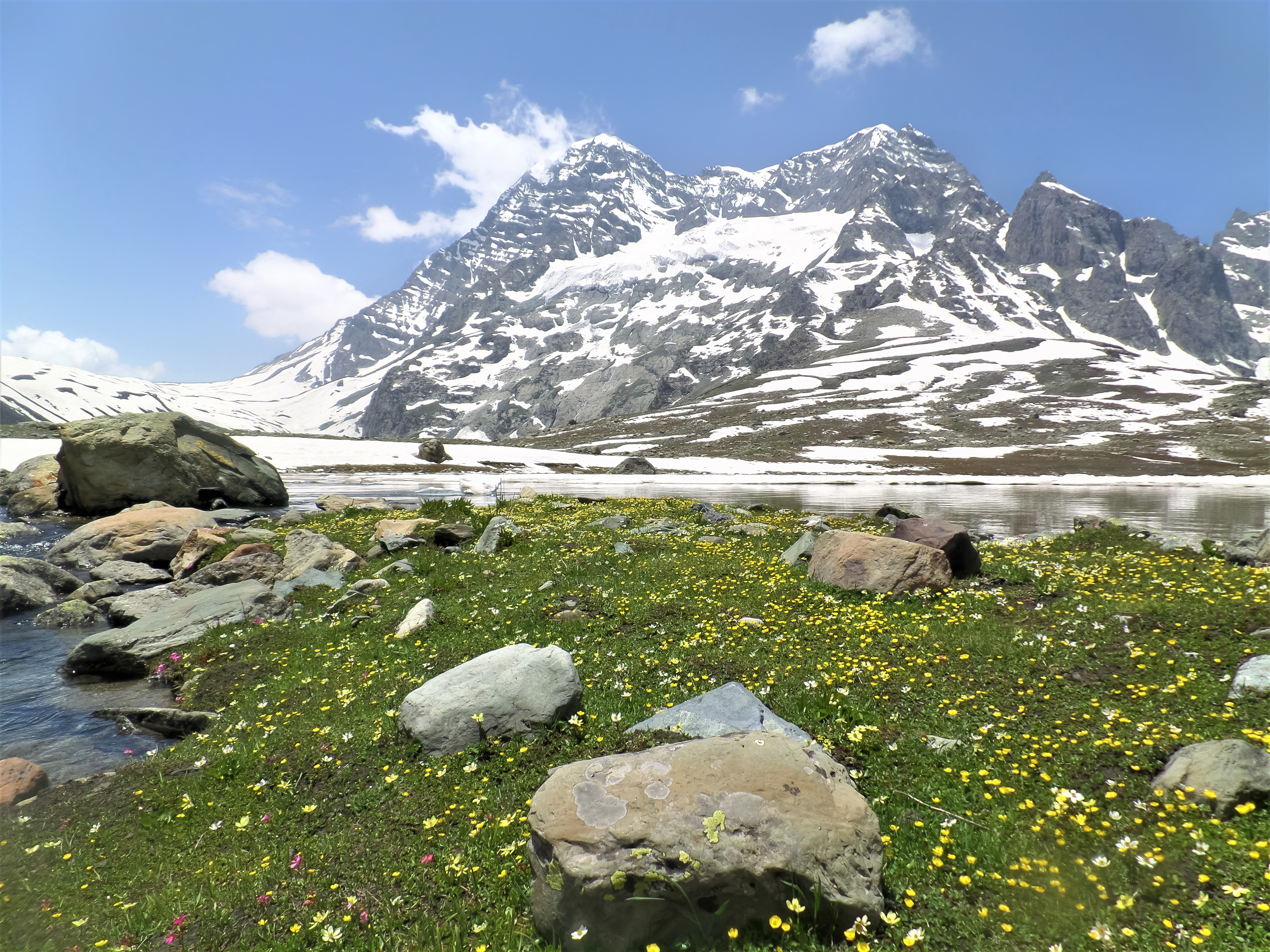
- Harmukh

Highest point
- Elevation: 17,388 ft (5,300 m)
- Prominence: 4,797 ft (1,462 m)
- Coordinates: 34°24′14″N 74°54′7″E

Geography
- Location within Jammu and Kashmir Location within India
- Country: India
- Territory: Jammu and Kashmir
- District: Ganderbal district
- Parent range: Himalayas

Climbing
- First ascent: 1899 by Dr Ernest Neve and Geoffrey Millais, United Kingdom
- Easiest route: Arin, Bandipore

Mount Harmukh or Haramukh is a mountain in the Himalayas of Jammu and Kashmir in India. Harmukh has a peak elevation of 5,300 metres (17,388 ft), and is located in Ganderbal district, between the Sind River to the south and Kishanganga River to the north, towers above Gangabal Lake in the vicinity of Kashmir Valley. It is mostly climbed from the northwestern side of Arin, via Kudara, Bandipore. Harmukh is considered sacred among the Kashmiri Shaivites.

== Etymology ==
Harmukh derives from Haramukuta, meaning "the diadem of Hara (Shiva)".

The entire region of Harmukh is also known as Ramaradhan, as it is believed that Parashurama had meditated near lakes on this mountain range.

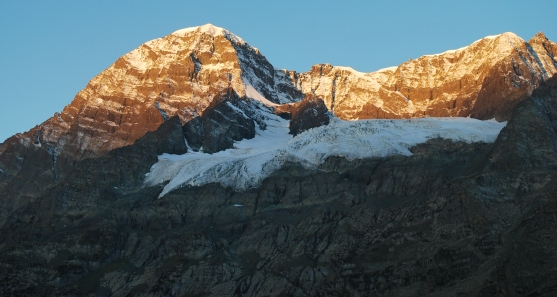
Mount Harmukh's summit

== Religious beliefs ==
Harmukh, with Gangbal Lake at its foot, is considered a sacred mountain by Hindus. It is also known as 'Kailash of Kashmir'. According to the legend of "Hurmukhuk Gosoni", once a hermit tried to reach the summit of Harmukh to see Shiva face to face. For twelve long years, he tried to scale the summit but failed until one day he saw a Gujar descending the summit. When the Gujar approached him, the hermit enquired as to what he had seen there. The Gujar said he had been searching for a stray goat, and that while searching he saw a couple milking a cow and drinking the milk from a human skull. The couple had offered him some milk, which he refused to drink; when they departed they rubbed a little of the milk on his forehead. When the Gujar indicated the spot where the milk was rubbed, the hermit was extremely joyful and rushed to lick his forehead.

== Harmukh Gangbal Yatra ==
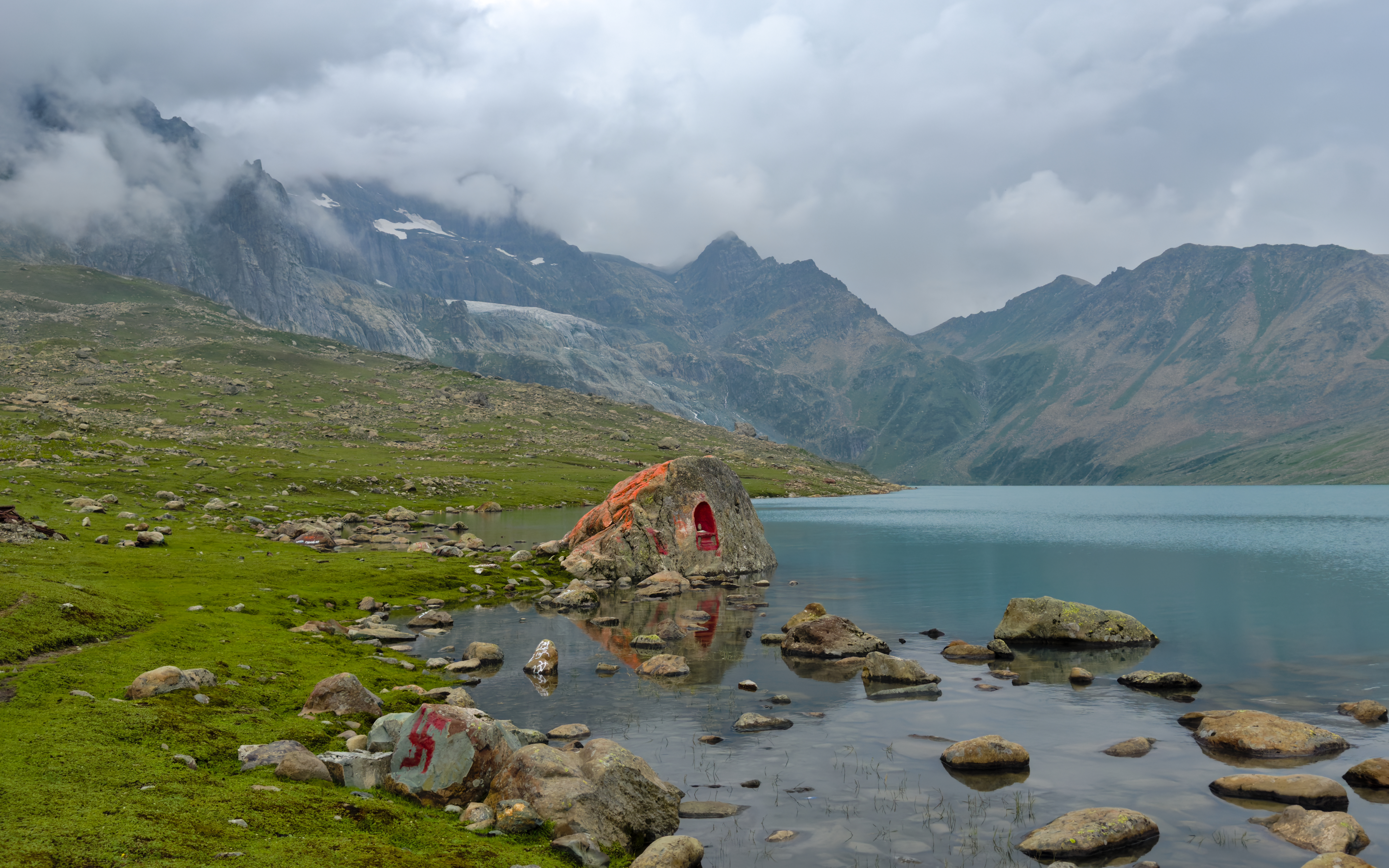
Shiva shrine at the Gangabal Lake, where the Harmukh Gangabal Yatra culminates

This pilgrimage takes place every year on the eve of Ganga Ashtami. The yatris begin their yatra from Naranag.

== Geographical setting ==
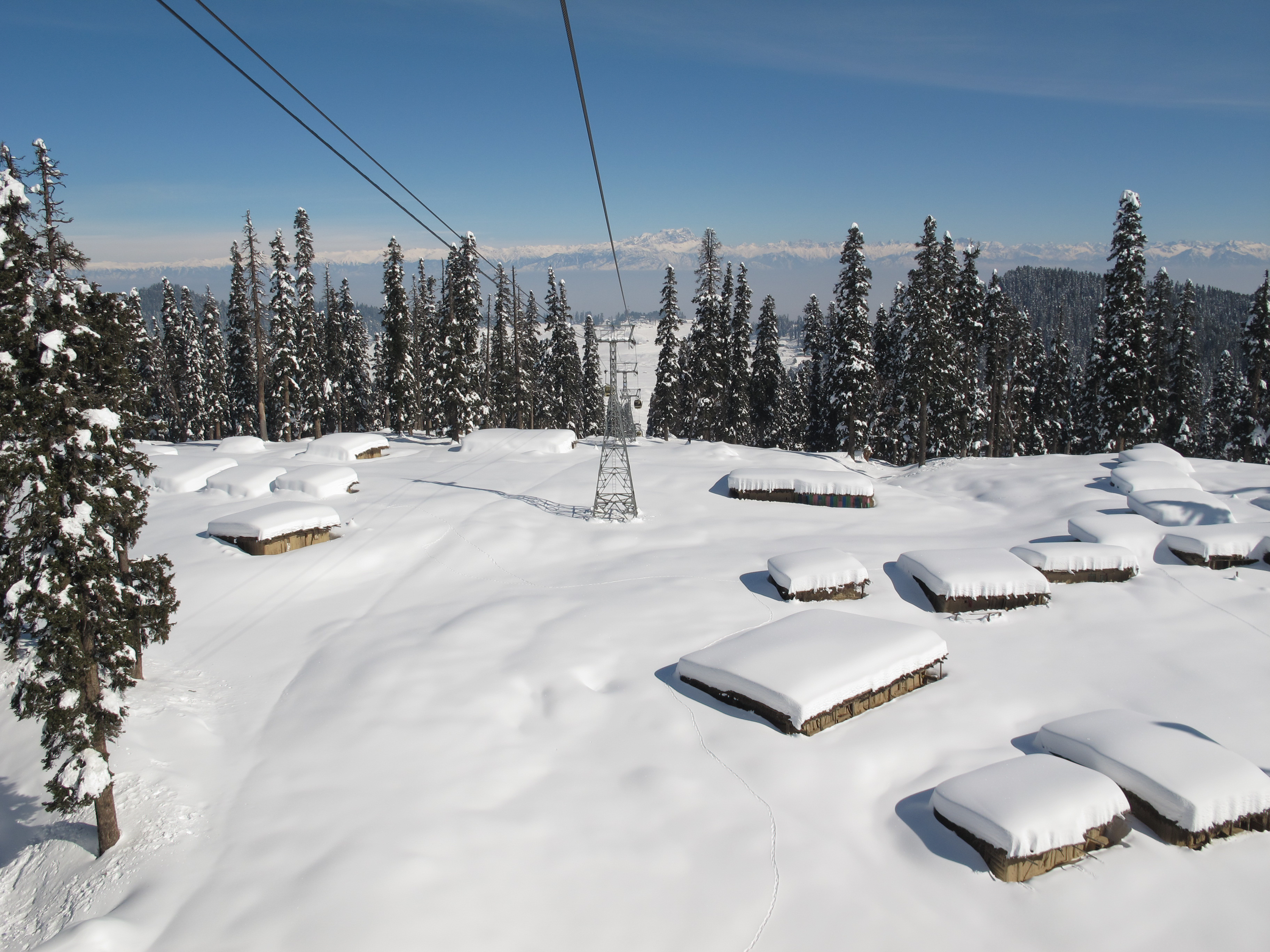
Photo taken from cable car in Gulmarg showing Haramukh towering above the Great Himalayan range in the distance

Harmukh lies in the northwestern Himalayan Range. The Kashmir Valley lies to its south. Water from melting glaciers form Gangabal Lake which lies at its foot to the north east side and contribute significantly to the regional fresh-water supply, supporting irrigation through Sind River. It is notable for its local relief as it is a consistently steep pyramid, dropping sharply to the east and south, with the eastern slope the steepest.

== Climbing history ==
The Harmukh mountain massif has several summits, the Station Peak being the lowest with a peak elevation of 4,698 metres (15,413 ft) was first climbed by members of the Great Trigonometric Survey of British India led by Thomas Montgomerie in 1856. Montgomerie made the first survey of the Karakoram range which lies some 210 km (130 miles) to the north from here and sketched the two most prominent peaks, labeling them K1 (also called Masherbrum) and K2, which is the world's second-highest mountain. The highest eastern peak 5,142 metres (16,870 ft) was summited by Dr Ernest Neve and Geoffrey Millais in 1899. The mountain has since become popular among climbers and mountaineers.

== Climbing routes ==
The easiest route among the different routes of Harmukh is via Erin, Bandipore, 47 km (29 mi) motorable road from Srinagar to Erin and 18 km (11 mi) of high altitude alpine trek leads to the base of Harmukh. Another trek leads from Naranag to the base of Harmukh at Gangabal Lake, but it is a steep climb at some places.
