= Wakura =

- Location in Jammu and Kashmir, India Wakura (India)
- Coordinates: 34.20°N 74.69°E
- Country: India
- Union territory: Jammu and Kashmir
- District: Ganderbal
- Settled: Ancient
- Elevation: 1,619 m (5,312 ft)

Languages
  - Official: Kashmiri, Urdu, Hindi, Dogri, English
- Time zone: UTC+5:30 (IST)
- PIN: 191131
- Distance from Delhi: 858.9 kilometres (533.7 mi)
- Distance from Mumbai: 2,206.7 kilometres (1,371.2 mi)

Wakura (sometimes spelled Wakoora or Wakora) is a village located in the Ganderbal district of Jammu and Kashmir, India in the disputed Kashmir region. In 2013 it was given tehsil status, with the tehsil headquarters located in Lar, 13 km away.

== Geography ==
Wakura is located 34.09°N 74.79°E 12 km towards west from district headquarters in Ganderbal, 20 km from union territory capital Srinagar. Wakura is divided into two Patwar Halqas viz; wakura and rakh-i-rabitar. Dab irrigation canal flows through the village dividing the village almost into two parts. Another irrigation canal called locally as Pout Kul also flows but its flow is restricted through inhabited area of the village. Several springs here are known for their water quality, but some have disappeared over the course of time due to garbage dumping.

== Demographics ==
The population of Wakura is 5,625. Males constitute 51% of the total population, while females constitute 49% of the total population. Agriculture and horticulture are the mainstay of the population. Urdu is the official language here, people also speak their native language (Kashmiri) as well as English. The population of Wakura consists mainly of Muslims which are in majority and some Hindu families. On an administrative level, Wakura is divided into two Panchayat Halqas; Wakura-A and Wakura-B.

== Reduced level ==
The reduced level of the area is 1,619 m above mean sea level.

== Education ==
- Baby's Land Public High School Wakura.
- Govt Higher secondary school wakura.
- Govt Girls secondary school Wakura.
- Saadat valley Educational institute Wakura.
- Govt Primary school Kumar Mohalla Wakura.
- Education Guarantee Scheme School wakura
- Govt middle school wakura

== See also ==
- Gogjigund
- Kangan
- Shallabugh
