= Ganderbal district =

- District
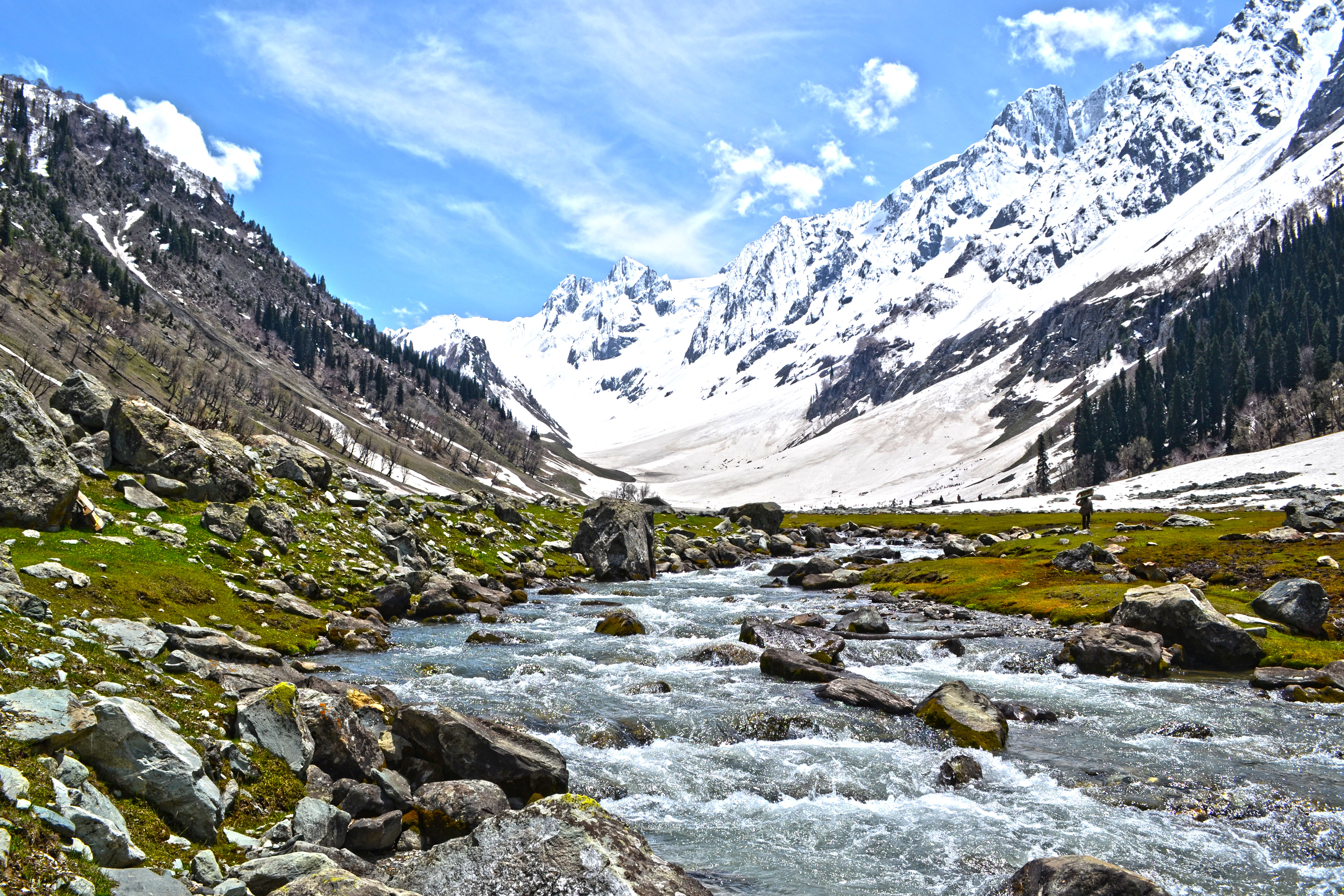
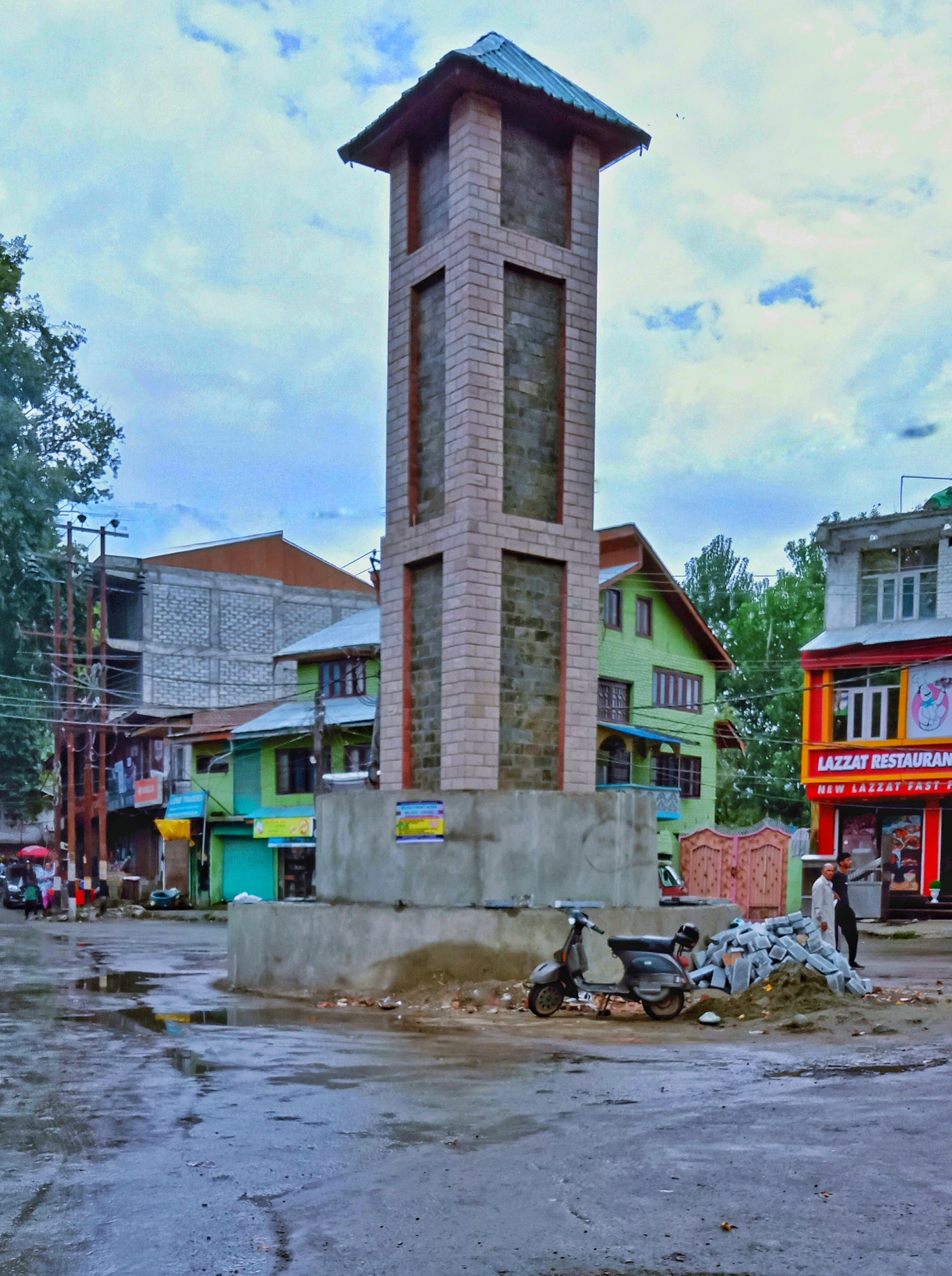
- Views of peaks around Sonamarg, Clock Tower Ganderbal, located at Gousia Chowk Duderhama Ganderbal

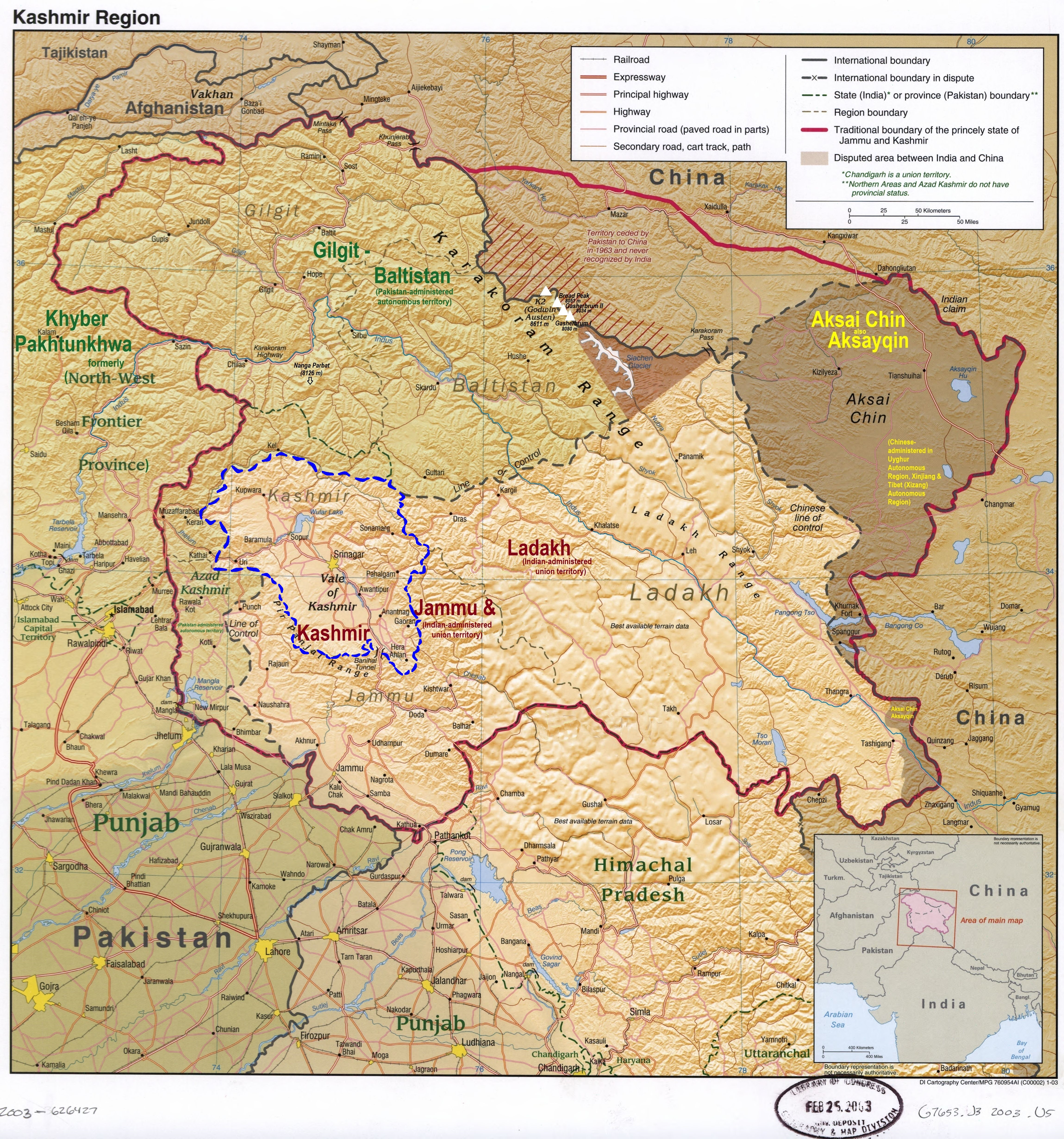
- Ganderbal district is in Indian-administered Jammu and Kashmir in the disputed Kashmir region. It is in the Kashmir division (bordered in neon blue).
- Interactive map of Ganderbal district
- Coordinates (Ganderbal): 34.23°N 74.78°E
- Administering country: India
- Union territory: Jammu and Kashmir
- Headquarters: Ganderbal

Area
  - Total: 1,049 km^{2} (405 sq mi)

Population (2011)
  - Total: 297,446
  - Density: 283.6/km^{2} (734.4/sq mi)
- Demonym(s): Ganderbaluk, Ganderbali, Ganderbalia, Ganderbalian

Languages
  - Official: Kashmiri, Urdu, Hindi, Dogri, English
  - Other: Kashmiri, Gujari, Pahari, Pashto
- Time zone: UTC+05:30 (IST)
- Pincode: 191201
- Area code: 194
- ISO 3166 code: 0194
- Vehicle registration: JK-16
- Website: ganderbal.nic.in

Ganderbal district is an Indian-administered district in Jammu and Kashmir in the disputed Kashmir region. It was formed in 2007 and has 6 subdistricts (tehsils): Kangan, Ganderbal, Tullamulla, Wakura, Lar, and Gund.

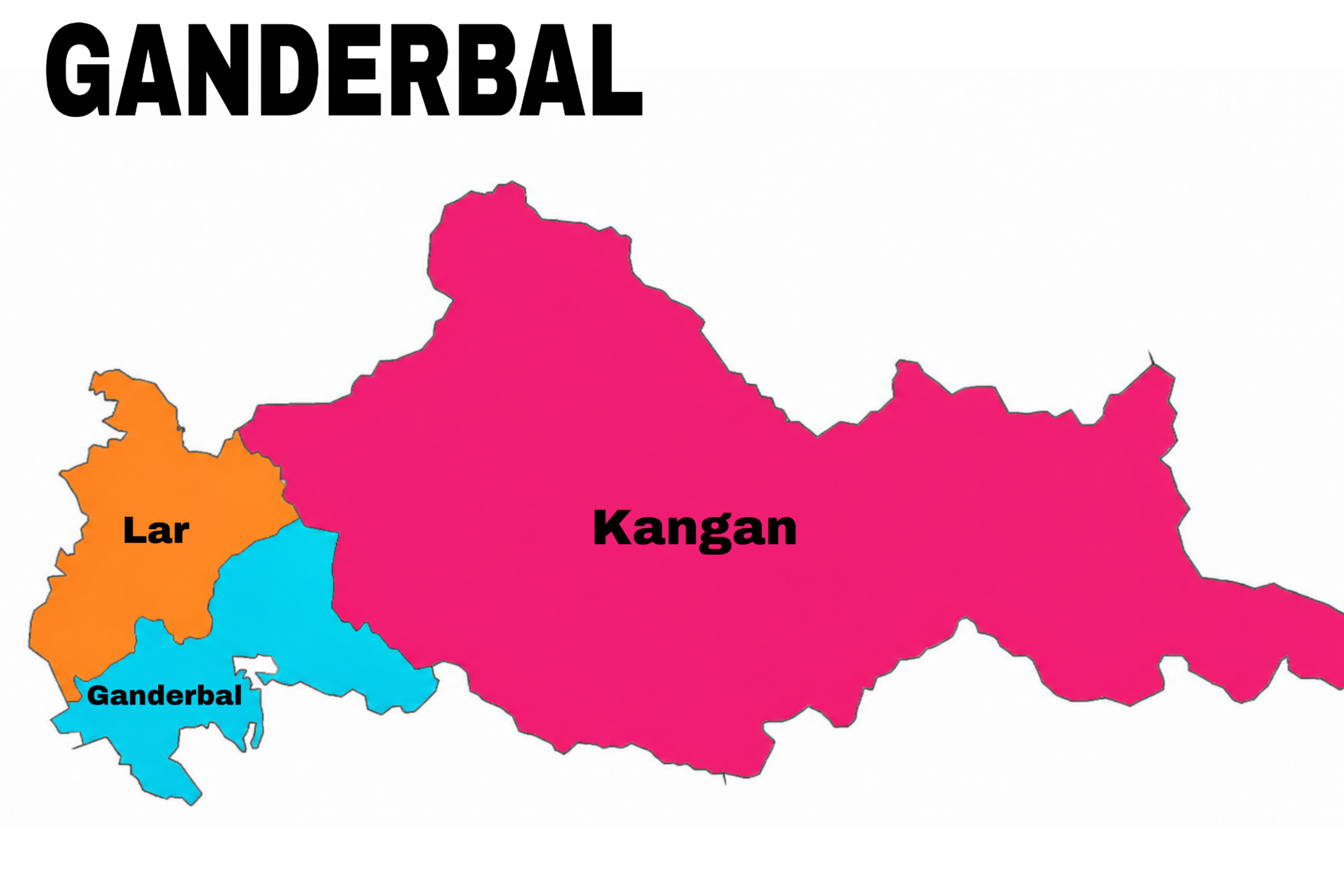
District map of Ganderbal

== Geography ==
Ganderbal district, has its district headquarters located at 33.73°N 75.15°E in the town of Ganderbal, is at an average elevation of 1,950 metres (6,400 ft) above mean sea level. The town is at a distance of 21 kilometres (13 mi) from Srinagar city. The total geographical area of Ganderbal district is 259 km2.

The mountainous Ganderbal district is spread across the Sind River. It is the only river in Jammu and Kashmir on which three hydroelectric power stations are functional, and provides water for irrigation. 80% of the population of the district is engaged with farming. The river sand (bajri), often mixed with cement, it produces is of high value.

Harmukh is the highest peak in the region and Gangbal the largest alpine lake.

=== Sub Districts ===
The district currently has six subdistricts (tehsils):

- Kangan
- Ganderbal
- Tullamulla
- Wakura
- Lar
- Gund

It is further divided into nine CD blocks: Ganderbal, Wakura, Lar, Kangan, Gund, Sherpathri, Phaag, Manigam and Batwina. Each block consists of a number of panchayats. Ganderbal District has 2 assembly constituencies: Kangan and Ganderbal.

=== Villages ===
The villages of Ganderbal district include:

- Baba Dariya Din
- Gogjigund
- Haripora
- Kangan
- Lar
- Naranag
- Nawabagh Ganderbal
- Paribal Shallabugh
- Shallabugh
- Sonamarg
- Wakura

== Demographics ==
=== Population ===
According to the 2011 census Ganderbal district has a population of 297,446. This gives it a ranking of 572nd in India (out of a total of 640). The district has a population density of 284 inhabitants per square kilometre (740/sq mi). Ganderbal has a sex ratio of 874 females for every 1000 males (this varies with religion), and a literacy rate of 58.04% Scheduled Castes and Scheduled Tribes make up 0.04% and 20.53% of the population respectively. 15.81% of the population lives in urban areas.

=== Social groups ===
Kashmiris and Gujjars are two major social groups of the Ganderbal district. Kashmiris make up 69.2% and Gujjars 20.21% in district's total population. Almost Gujjar is considered to a be major ethnic group of the district. Kashmiris (included Hindu & Muslim) and Gujjars includes Bakarwal (subgroup of nomadic Gujjars).

=== Language ===
Languages of Ganderbal district (2011)
1. Kashmiri (68.9%)
2. Gujari (20.2%)
3. Pashto (3.49%)
4. Pahari (2.61%)
5. Shina (1.33%)
6. Hindi (1.31%)
7. Others (2.13%)

Kashmiri and Gujari are two major spoken languages in Ganderbal district. Kashmiri spoken by 68.92% and Gujari by 20.21% Gujari of district's total population. Other spoken languages include: 3.49% Pashto, 2.61% Pahari, 1.33% Shina and 1.31% Hindi as their first language. Gujari makes up 40% of the population in Kangan tehsil. Balti and Shina are also spoken by small populations in the high mountains.

=== Religion ===
Religion in Ganderbal district (2011)
Religion	Percent
Islam	97.69%
Hinduism	1.88%
Other or not stated	0.43%

Sex Ratio in Ganderbal District in 2011 Census. (no. females per 1,000 males)
Religion (and population)	Sex Ratio
Muslim (pop 290,581)	905
Hindu (pop 5,592)	79
Other (pop 1,273)	316
Total (pop 297,446)	874

Ganderbal district: religion, gender ratio, and % urban of population, according to the 2011 Census.
	Hindu	Muslim	Christian	Sikh	Buddhist	Jain	Other	Not stated	Total
Total	5,592	290,581	406	486	25	8	4	344	297,446
Total	1.88%	97.69%	0.14%	0.16%	0.01%	0.00%	0.00%	0.12%	100.00%
Male	5,182	152,571	255	458	19	1	3	231	158,720
Female	410	138,010	151	28	6	7	1	113	138,726
Gender ratio (% female)	7.3%	47.5%	37.2%	5.8%	24.0%	87.5%	25.0%	32.8%	46.6%
Sex ratio (no. of females per 1,000 males)	79	905	–	–	–	–	–	–	874
Urban	389	46,498	53	38	3	0	1	57	47,039
Rural	5,203	244,083	353	448	22	8	3	287	250,407
% Urban	7.0%	16.0%	13.1%	7.8%	12.0%	0.0%	25.0%	16.6%	15.8%

== Tourism ==
The Ganderbal district is located in valley of the Sindh River, also known as Nallah Sindh. It is often called the District of Lakes, as it possesses the large number of lakes in Jammu and Kashmir (union territory).

=== Sonamarg ===
Sonamarg, is a hill station located 80 kilometers from Srinagar. At an altitude of 2,800 meters, it has views of snow-clad mountains, alpine meadows, and the Sindh River. It serves as a starting point for treks to high altitude lakes like Vishansar, Krishansar, Gadsar and Gangabal.

=== Manasbal Lake ===
Manasbal Lake, located 12 kilometres (7.5 mi) north west of Ganderbal, is a tourist destination known for its scenery and wildlife. Covering 5 kilometres (3.1 mi) long and 1 kilometre (0.62 mi) wide. It is located in the Jhelum valley, north of Srinagar city. Named after Lake Manasarovar. it is surrounded by three villages: Jarokbal, Kondabal and Gratabal. The lake is known for its large growth of lotus plants.

Manasbal Lake is a good place for birdwatchers. Despite its natural beauty and ecological importance, the lake faces challenges such as environmental degradation and tourism-related pressures. Lake is accessible through Srinagar involves a 30-kilometer road journey via Shadipur, Nasim, and Ganderbal.

=== Prang ===
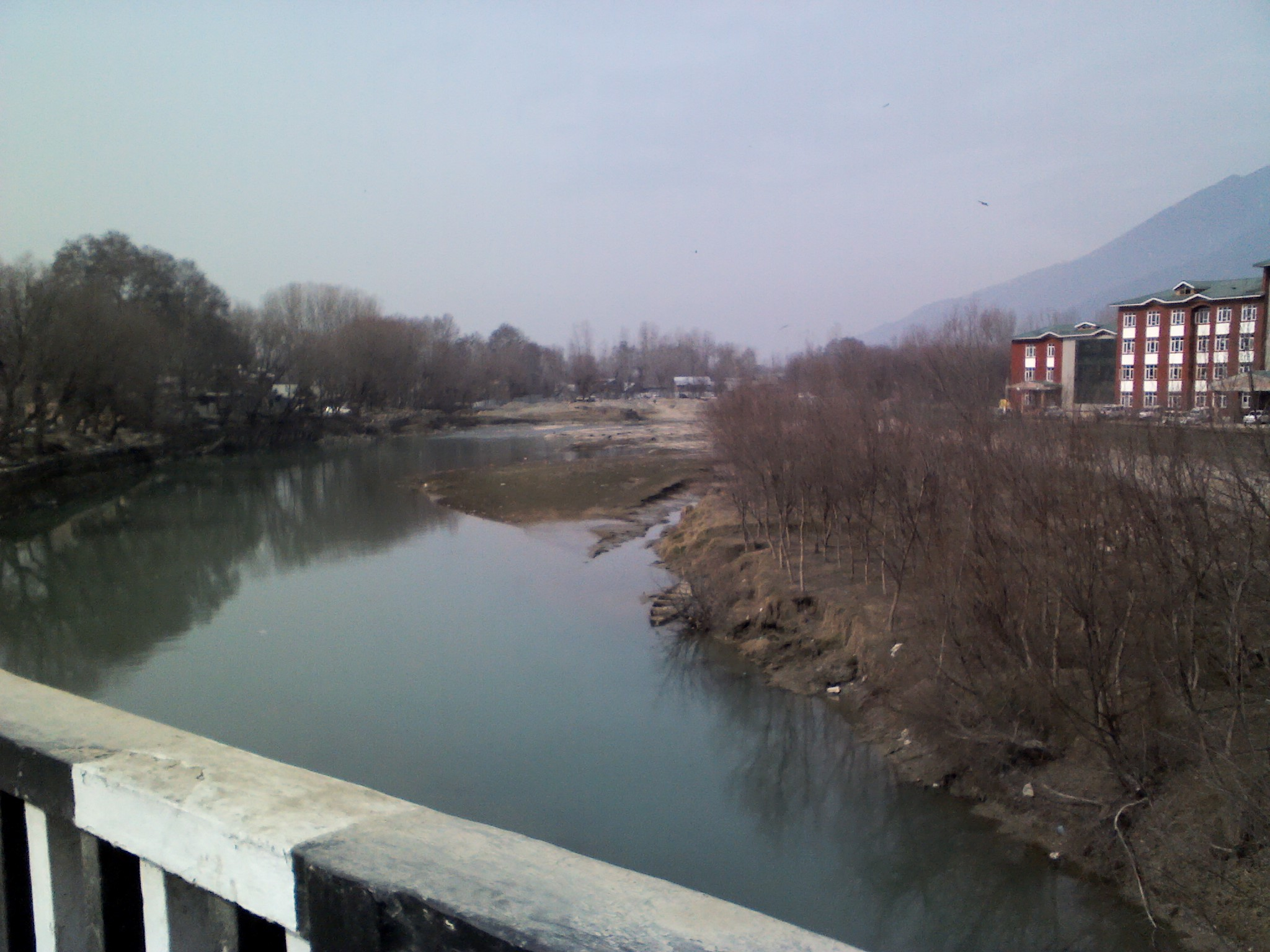
Sindh River

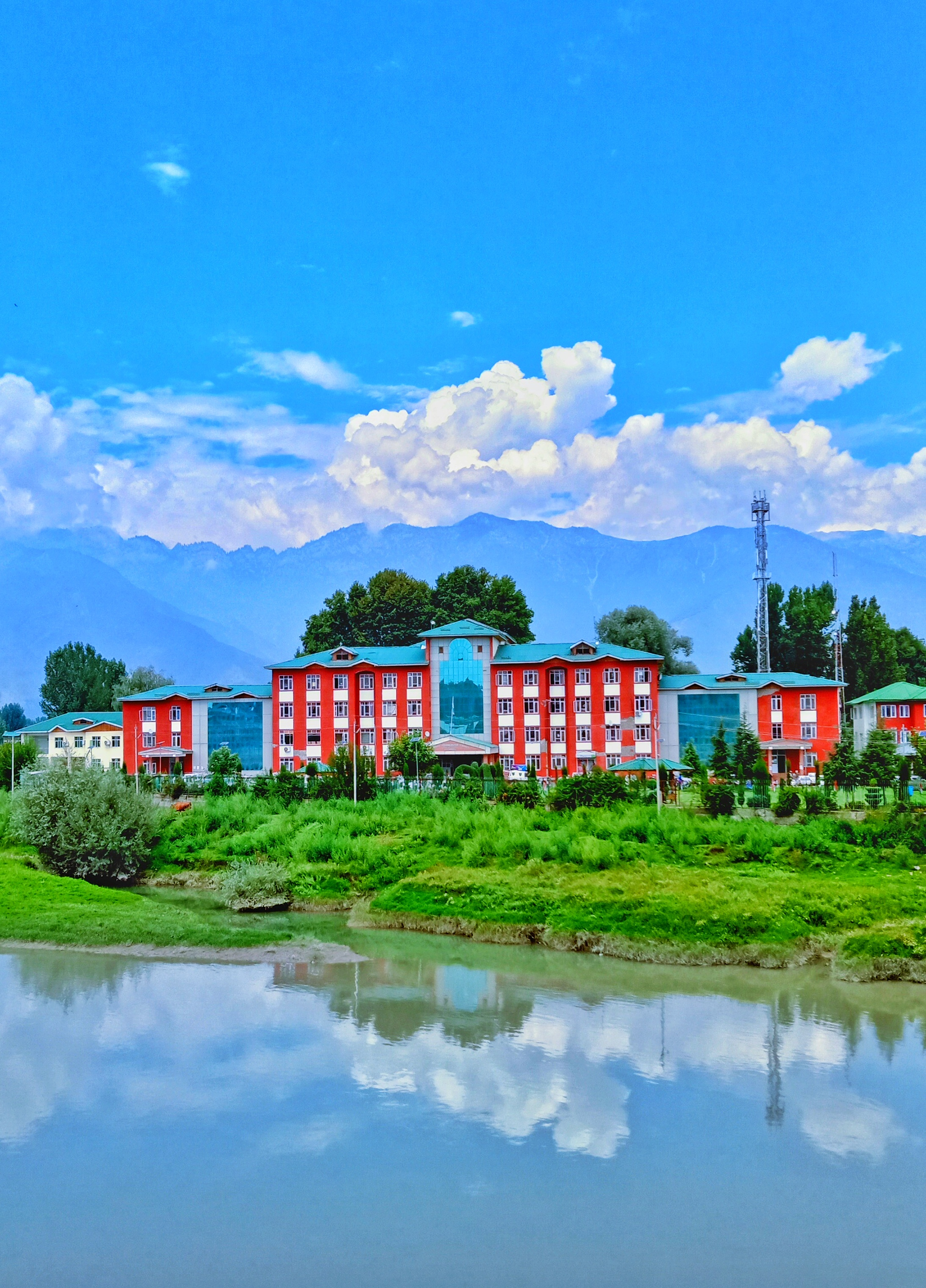
Ganderbal (constituency of the Jammu and Kashmir Legislative Assembly)

Prang village is 12 kilometres far from the central hub (beehama) of district Ganderbal, towards the east. This village falls under the jurisdiction of tehsil Kangan. The Prang garden was a picnic spot in 1990's before the establishment of army base camp, but the army camp was later evacuated from the garden in the year 2008. This garden is situated on the banks of the Sindh River. The famous Environmental park (also known as "dumping park") is in the adjacent village of Prang. The nearby areas of this village are "Lari Prang, Check Prang, Herra Prang, Pati Prang and dragtung".

=== Mohand Marg ===
Mohand Marg is an alpine meadow in the Lar tehsil. In summer it is a tourist destination for trekking and camping. Sir Aurel Stein was the first person to explore the place, pitching his camp in the summer of 1895.

It is hidden in the mountains to the north of Srinagar at the foot of Haramukh Peaks about 25 kilometers from Srinagar via the Ganderbal road towards Leh. From the road it is accessed via 5 kilometer trek up a steep path through the hill-side settlements and fields of Lar and Chount Waliwar before the 'Marg' opens out across the mountain side giving views of the Sindh Valley far below in one direction and the Valley of Kashmir in the other.

=== Harmukh ===
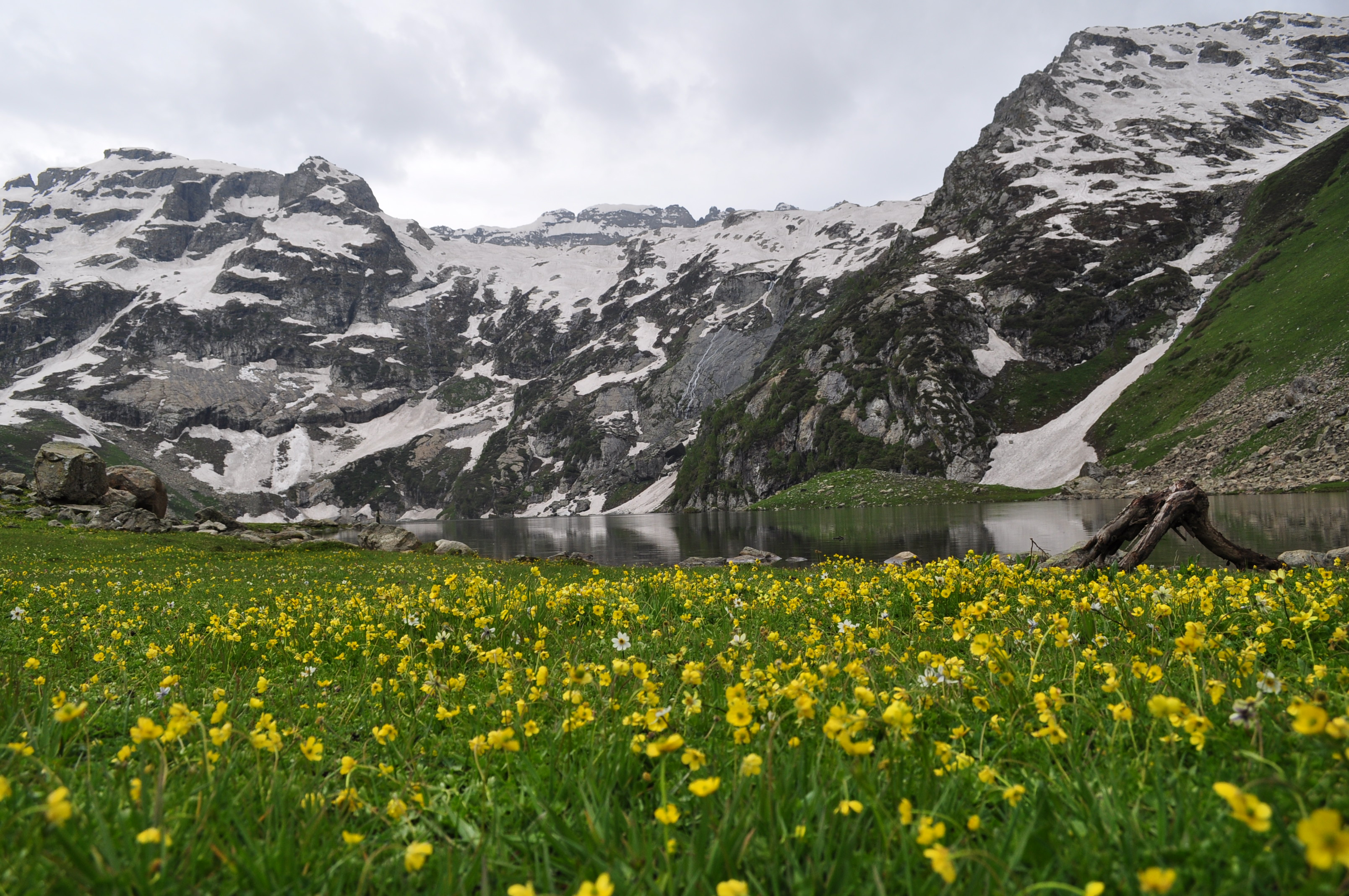
Gangabal Lake at foothills of Harmukh

Harmukh (also known as Mount Haramukh or Harmukh mountain) is a mountain with an elevation of 16,890 ft (5,148 metres), in Ganderbal district. Harmukh is part of the Himalaya Range, and is located between Sindh River to its south and Kishanganga River to its north. It rises above the Gangabal Lake in the vicinity of Kashmir Valley.

Harmukh was first climbed by the Great Trigonometrical Survey's Thomas Montgomerie in 1856 and made the first survey of the Karakoram some 210 km (130 miles) to the south, and sketched the two most prominent peaks, labelling them K1 and K2. Harmukh was later climbed by many other climbers. Therefore, Harmukh is the mountain from which the world's second highest mountain peak K2 was discovered and the Serveyer's mark K2 continues to be the name.

=== Gangabal Lake ===
Gangabal Lake, also called Gangbal, is a lake situated at the foothills of Mount Haramukh (one of the highest mountain peak in the vicinity of Kashmir valley) in Ganderbal district, north of Srinagar city in Jammu and Kashmir. It is an alpine high altitude oligotrophic lake, and is home to many types of fishes of which one is the brown trout.

The lake has a maximum length of 2.5 kilometres (1.6 mi) and maximum width of 1 kilometre (0.62 mi). It is fed by precipitation, glaciers and springs. The lake water outflows to a nearby small lake (Nundkol) and then via Wangath nullah to Sindh River. The trout fishes are present in the lake. Gangabal lake is approached from Srinagar 45 kilometres (28 mi) by road via Ganderbal up to Naranag and then a 15 kilometres (9.3 mi) track upslope.

=== Shallabugh Wetland ===
Shallabugh Wetland, situated in the Shallabugh village of Kashmir valley, is a good place of ecological significance. It was declared as a Ramsar Site recently. It serves as a vital habitat for numerous species of migratory birds, offering them a seasonal refuge during their journeys. The wetland's diverse flora and fauna contribute to the rich biodiversity of the region.

=== Religious sites ===
==== Kheer Bhawani ====
Kheer Bhawani is a temple dedicated to the goddess Bhavani, constructed over a spring in Tulmul village. The name of the temple is derived from both the rice pudding (kheer) that is used as an offering, and the goddess it is offered to.

==== Naranag Temple ====
The Naranag Temple is located near the Harmukh Mountain, around 50 kilometres (31 mi) from Srinagar. The temple is dedicated to Lord Shiva.

== Lakes and Rivers ==
There are many lakes and rivers in the Ganderbal district. Lakes include Plain and alpine varieties with over 100 alpine lakes.

=== Lakes ===
==== Plain lakes ====
- Ahansar Lake
- Khanpursar Lake
- Manasbal Lake
- Narayanbagh Lake
- Waskura Lake
- Shallabugh Wetland (which includes some portion of Anchar Lake)

==== Alpine lakes ====
- Gadsar Lake
- Gangabal Lake
- Krishansar Lake
- Nundkol Lake
- Satsar Lake
- Vishansar Lake
- Durinar Lake III or Barafsar (located at an elevation of 4,650 meters above sea level) is the highest altitude alpine lake in Kashmir.

=== Rivers ===
1. Sind River - The primary river flowing through the district, originating from the Zoji La pass and running throughout Ganderbal.

2. Kishanganga/Neelum River - This river originates in vicinity of Sonamarg and flows onward across the Line of Control and enters the Pakistan.

3. Jhelum River - The major river of Kashmir that flows through some villages in the Ganderbal district, and play an important role in the region's agriculture and water supply.

4. Wangath River or Wangath Nallah, is an important tributary of the Sind River. This river originate from Gangabal Lake and merges with Sindh River at Kichpora Kangan

5. Nilagrad River - is small important mountain river located 6 kilometres away from hill station Sonamarg. The river's unique reddish coloration, attributed to the presence of iron oxide deposits, is locally believed to possess healing and curative powers, especially for skin ailments.

== Agriculture ==
=== Grape Cultivation ===
Lar town stands out for its grape cultivation, yielding the highest production in the entire valley. This has given Ganderbal the title of the Grape Town of Kashmir.

=== Cherry Production ===
Ganderbal district, with approximately 1,200 hectares of land under cherry cultivation, is considered the hub of the cherry crop, producing around 60 percent of the total cherry output in the Kashmir Valley. Nearly a dozen villages, including Lar, Waliwar, Chuntwaliwar, Gutlibagh, Zazna, Kangan, Dab, Batwina, Yungoora, Wakura, and other areas of the district, are known for producing various varieties of cherries.

=== Apple Production ===
Ganderbal district is one of the major apple producing districts of Kashmir Valley. Zazna, Nawabagh Badampora, Kurhama, Zarigund, Wakura, Batwina, Khanpora etcetera are major apple producing places

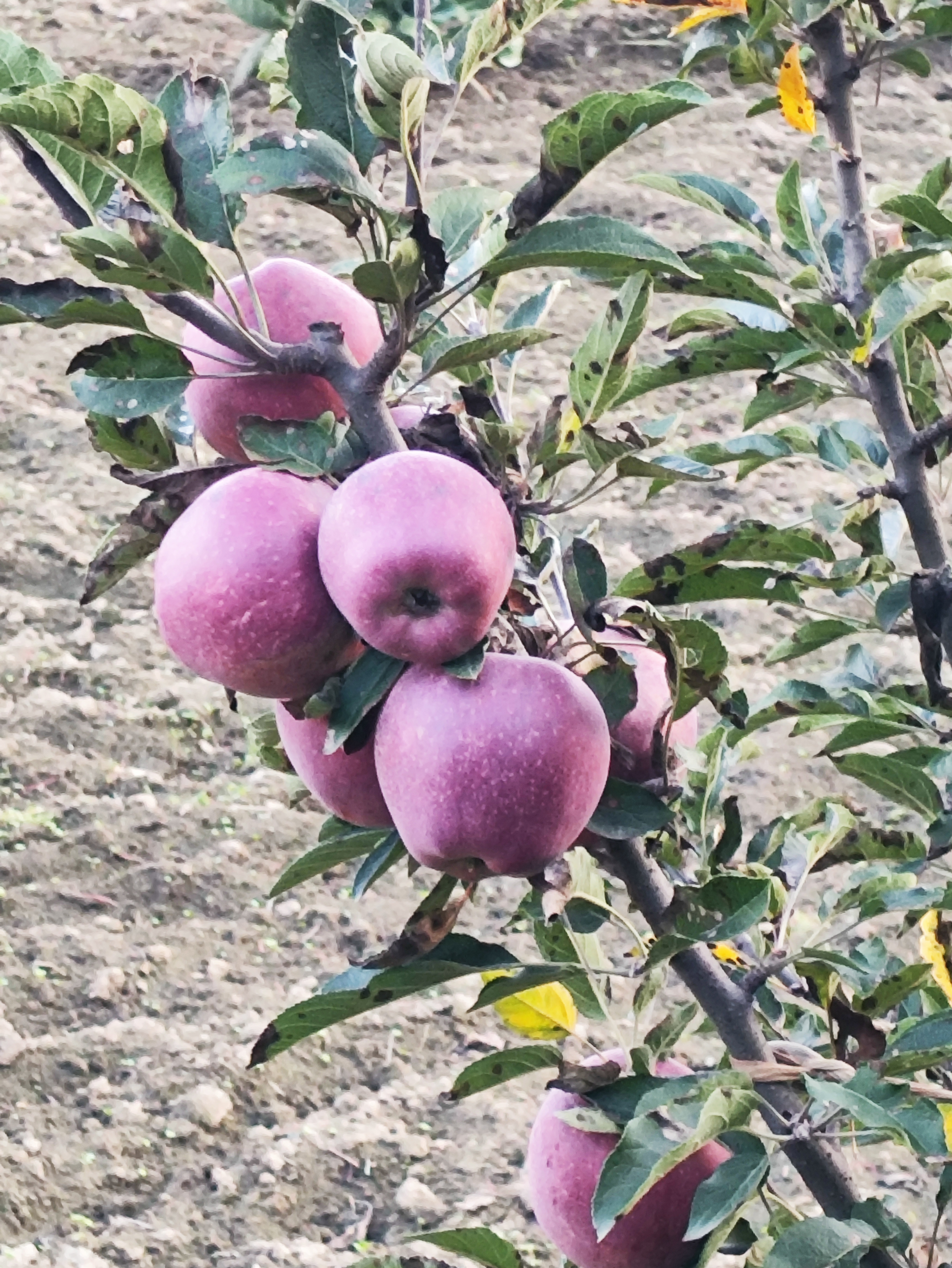
Kashmiri Apple near Zarigund

There are lot of apple varieties cultuvated in Ganderbal like Delicious, American, Golden, Maharaji, Hazratbali etcetera. There is also a Farmers' Market (mandi) at Zazna were farmer can sell their apple and giving boost to local economy.

== Wicker Work ==
The Ganderbal district, particularly the Sherpathri belt, is renowned as the Wicker Hub of Kashmir due to its distinctive wicker artisans. Spanning nearly 25 small hamlets, most of the population in this area is associated with the craft of wickerwork. These craftsmen create a variety of items, including chairs, sofas, baskets, flower vases, and kitchen essentials, using locally sourced willow reeds.

== Educational institutions ==
The colleges and universities located in the District of Ganderbal include:

- Central University of Kashmir, Tullamulla
- Government Degree College, Ganderbal
- Three faculties of Sher-e-Kashmir University of Agricultural Sciences and Technology of Kashmir:-
  - Faculty of Veterinary Sciences and Animal Husbandry, Shuhama
  - Faculty of Forestry, Benhama
  - Faculty of Fisheries, Rangil
- Sainik School, Manasbal

== Tunnels ==
- Z-Morh Tunnel
- Zoji-la Tunnel
