= Naranag =

Naranag Nara Nag
- Village
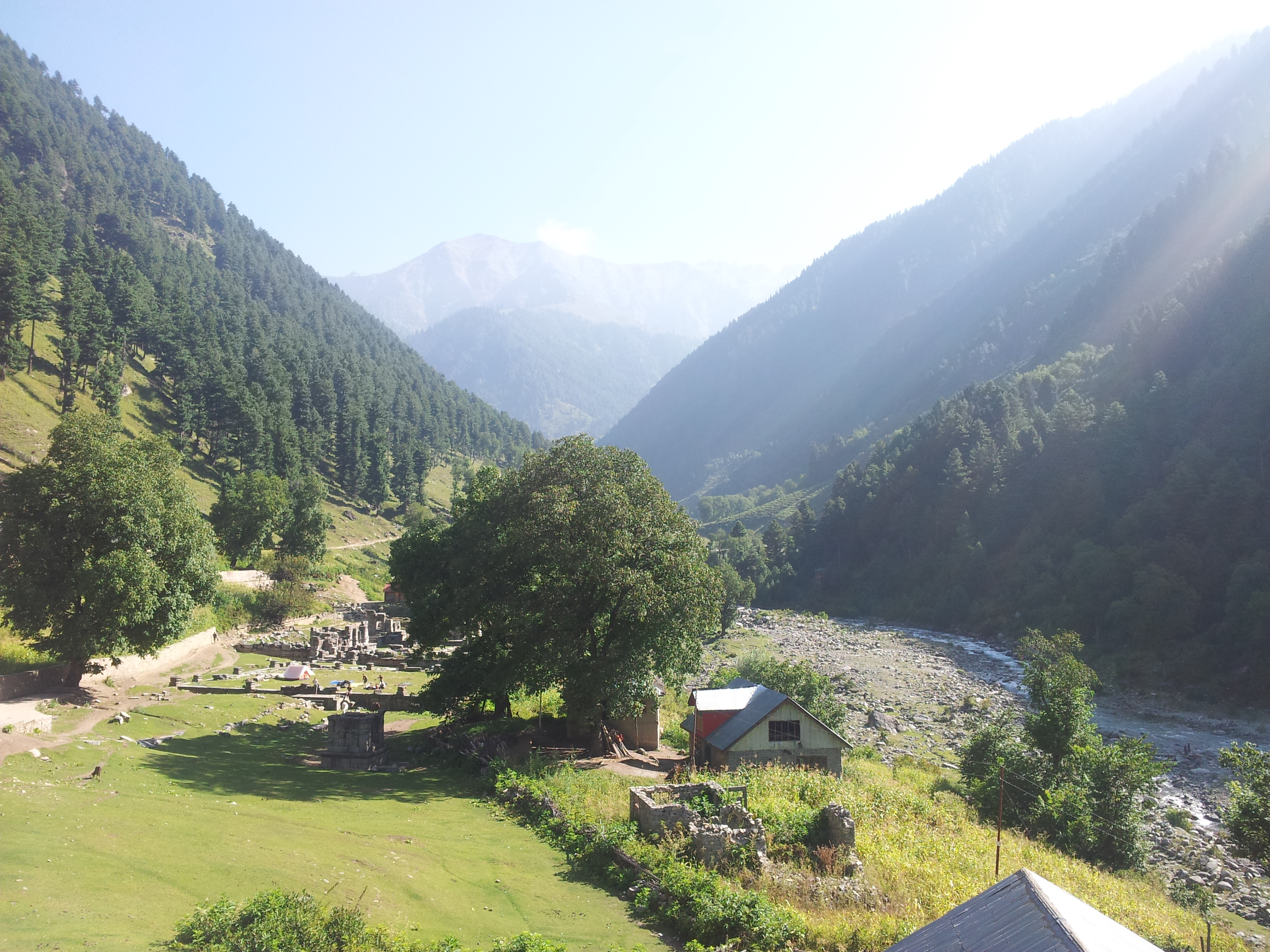
- Naranag, Ganderbal district, J&K, India

- Location within Jammu and Kashmir Location within India
- Coordinates: 34°21′09″N 74°58′30″E
- Country: India
- State: Jammu & Kashmir
- Division: Kashmir
- District: Ganderbal
- CD Block: Kangan
- Elevation: 2,128 m (6,982 ft)

Languages
  - Official: Kashmiri, Urdu, Hindi, Dogri, English
- Time zone: UTC+5:30 (IST)
- Postal Index Number: 191202
- Vehicle registration: JK16

Naranag or (Nara Nag) is a tourist village and ancient Hindu pilgrimage site, near Ganderbal town in the Ganderbal district of the Kashmir Valley in Jammu and Kashmir. Well known for its ancient temple ruins complex, it is located around 16 km from Kangan, 10 km upstream from the Sind River. Noted for its scenic meadows, lakes and mountains, it is a base camp for trekking to the Mount Haramukh 16,870 ft (5,142 meters) and Gangabal Lake. The village lies on the left bank of the Wangath River, which is a tributary of the Sind River. There is a Tourism hut at Naranag where tourism officials are available to provide information and assistance. The hut also offers accommodation.

== Tourism ==
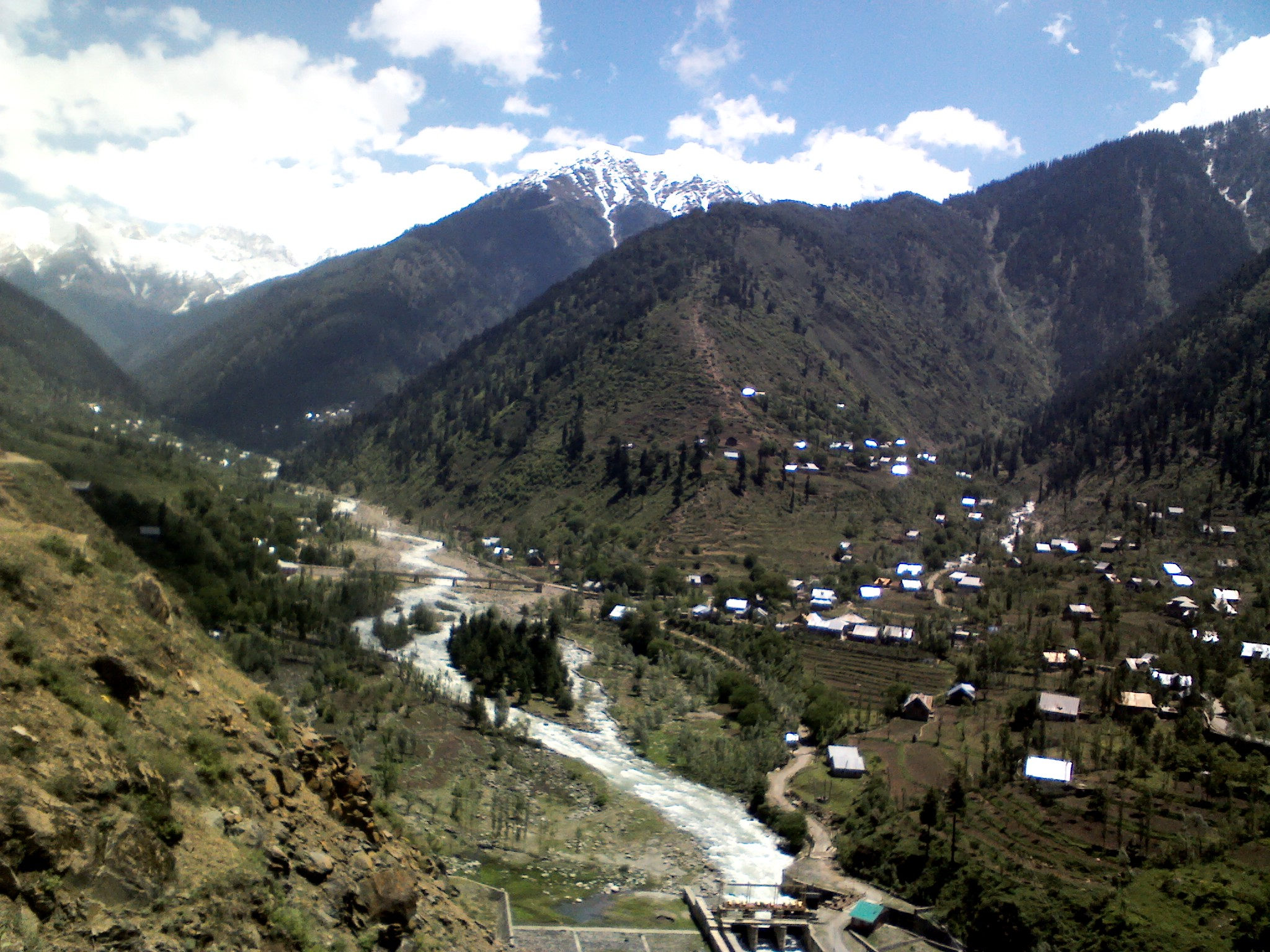
Naranag Valley

The Naranag valley is noted for its scenic meadows. The village is a base camp for trekkers to the Mount Haramukh, the Gangabal Lake and Satsar (the seven lakes). It is also a base for the trekkers to Gadsar Lake, the Vishansar Lake and the Krishansar Lake, though it takes 5 to 7 days of trekking.

There are also many other peaks and alpine meadows around the Naranag Valley. In the winters, Naranag receives heavy snowfall, during which skiing is practiced.

== Naranag Temple ==
The Naranag temple is the main attraction for tourists. It is one of the important archaeological sites of the country. The site consists of a cluster of temples facing each other at a distance of about 200 meters. Historians say that the temple is dedicated to Shiva and was built by Lalitaditya Muktapida, of the Kayastha Naga Karkota Dynasty in the 8th century AD. It is believed that the king Awantivarman paid a visit and donated a pedestal for bathing at Bhuteshwar ("Bhutsher").

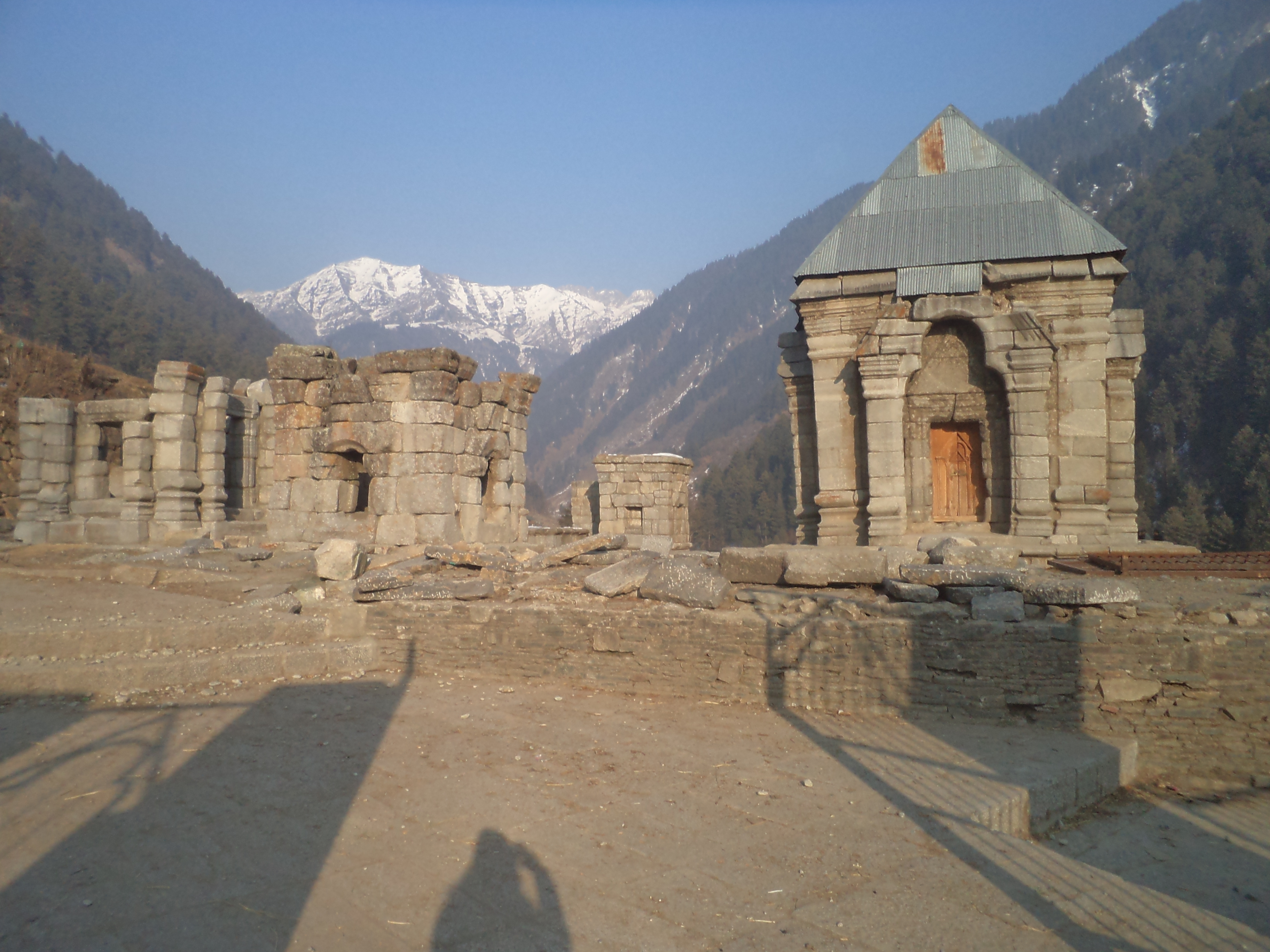
Naranag Temple

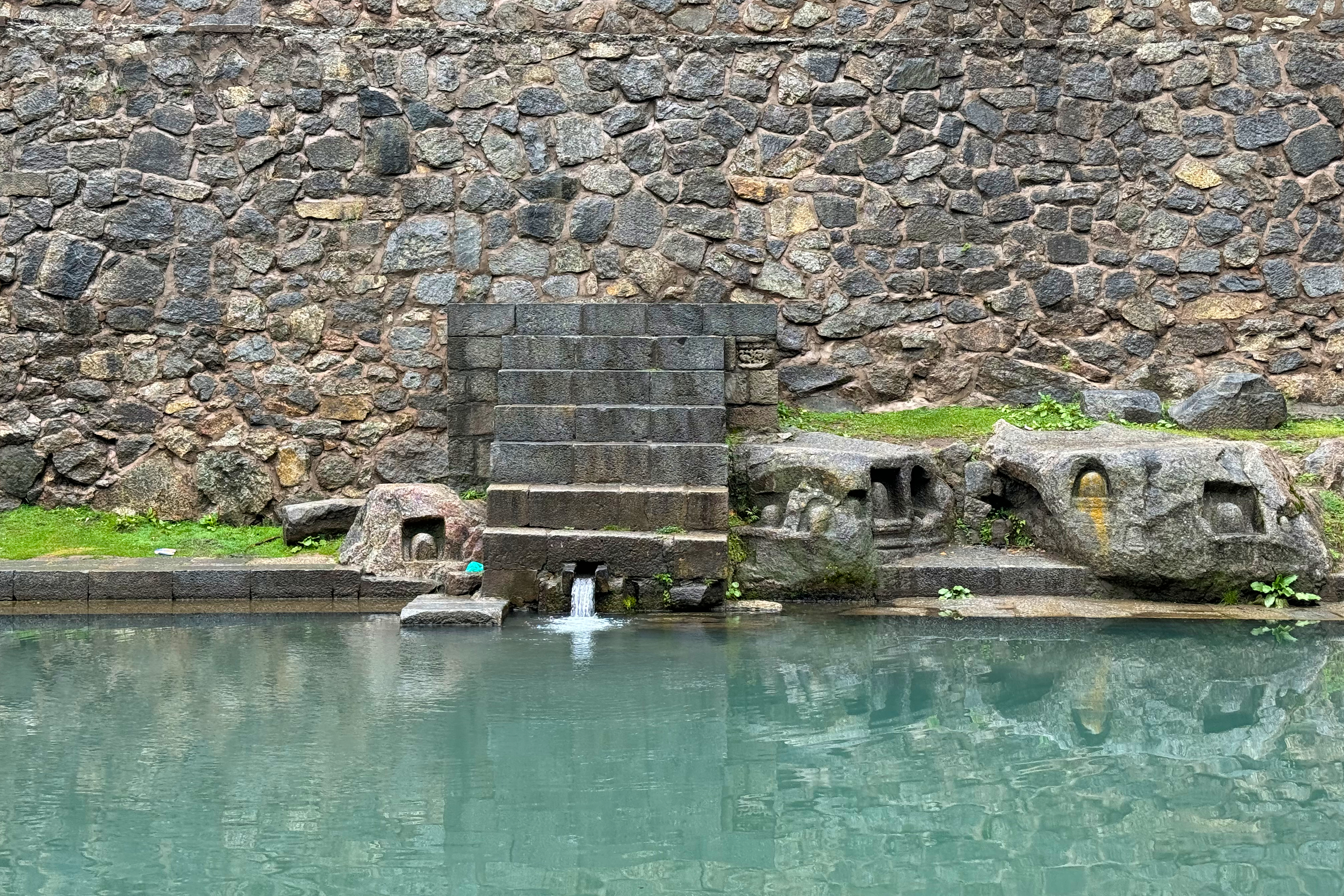
Naranag spring near the temple, with shiva lingam relief

It is also believed to be dedicated to the ancient Nagas. Hence, the name "Naranag". It was built by the Naga Karkotas, who are said to be Hindu Kashmiri Saraswat Brahmins of the Naga sect, known for their reverence for serpents. They used to stay here and do their sadhanas. According to local belief, these structures are built by some supernatural powers called (daya) in the local language. Such beliefs remain popular among residents.

The government has built perimeter walls around the temple ruins to protect it from encroachment. Every year on the eve of pilgrimage to Gangabal Lake by Kashmiri Pandits, prayers are offered at the temple complex to kick start the pilgrimage.

== Issues ==
The residents of the village, as well as tourists, face hardships due to the unavailability of mobile connectivity in the village. Naranag does not have mobile connectivity even after its launch across Jammu and Kashmir in 2003.

== See also ==
- Wangath Temple complex
