= Gadsar Lake =

Lake in Jammu and Kashmir, India

- Lake of Fishes
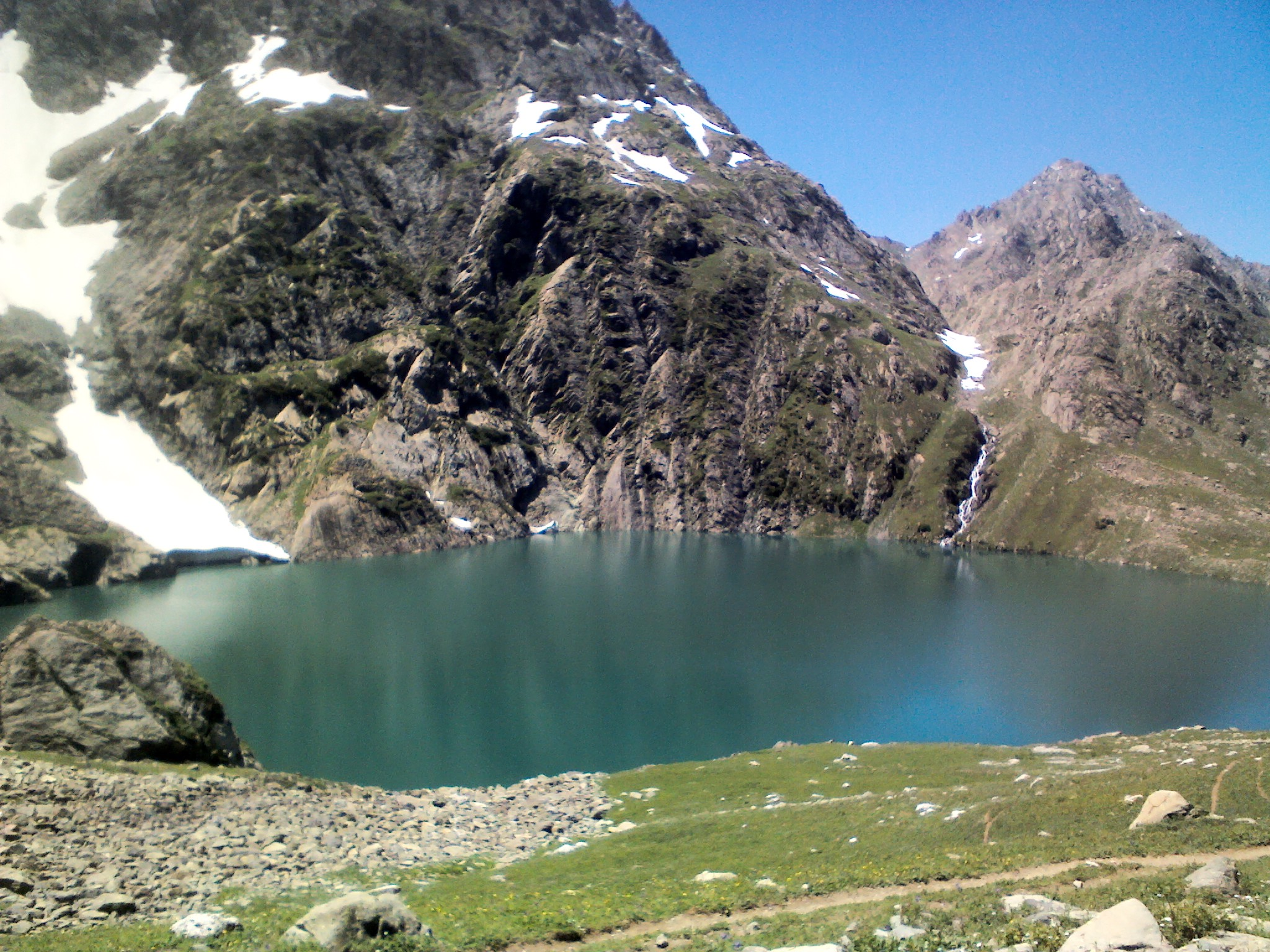
- Gadsar Lake in 2014

- Location within Jammu and Kashmir Location within India
- Location: Gurez tehsil, Bandipore district, Jammu and Kashmir, India
- Coordinates: 34.421669°N 75.057274°E
- Type: oligotrophic lake
- Primary inflows: Melting of snow
- Primary outflows: A stream tributary of Neelum River
- Basin countries: India
- Max. length: 0.85 kilometres (0.53 mi)
- Max. width: 0.76 kilometres (0.47 mi)
- Surface area: 0.7421 km^{2} (0.2865 sq mi)
- Surface elevation: 3,600 metres (11,800 ft)
- Frozen: December to April

The Gadsar Lake or Gad Sar (lit. 'lake of fishes'), also called Yem Sar (lit. 'lake of Yama'), is an "alpine high-altitude oligotrophic lake" in the Bandipore district of Kashmir Division, in Jammu and Kashmir, India. It has an elevation of 3,600 metres (11,800 ft), a maximum length of 0.85km, and a maximum width of 0.76km.

== Etymology, geography ==
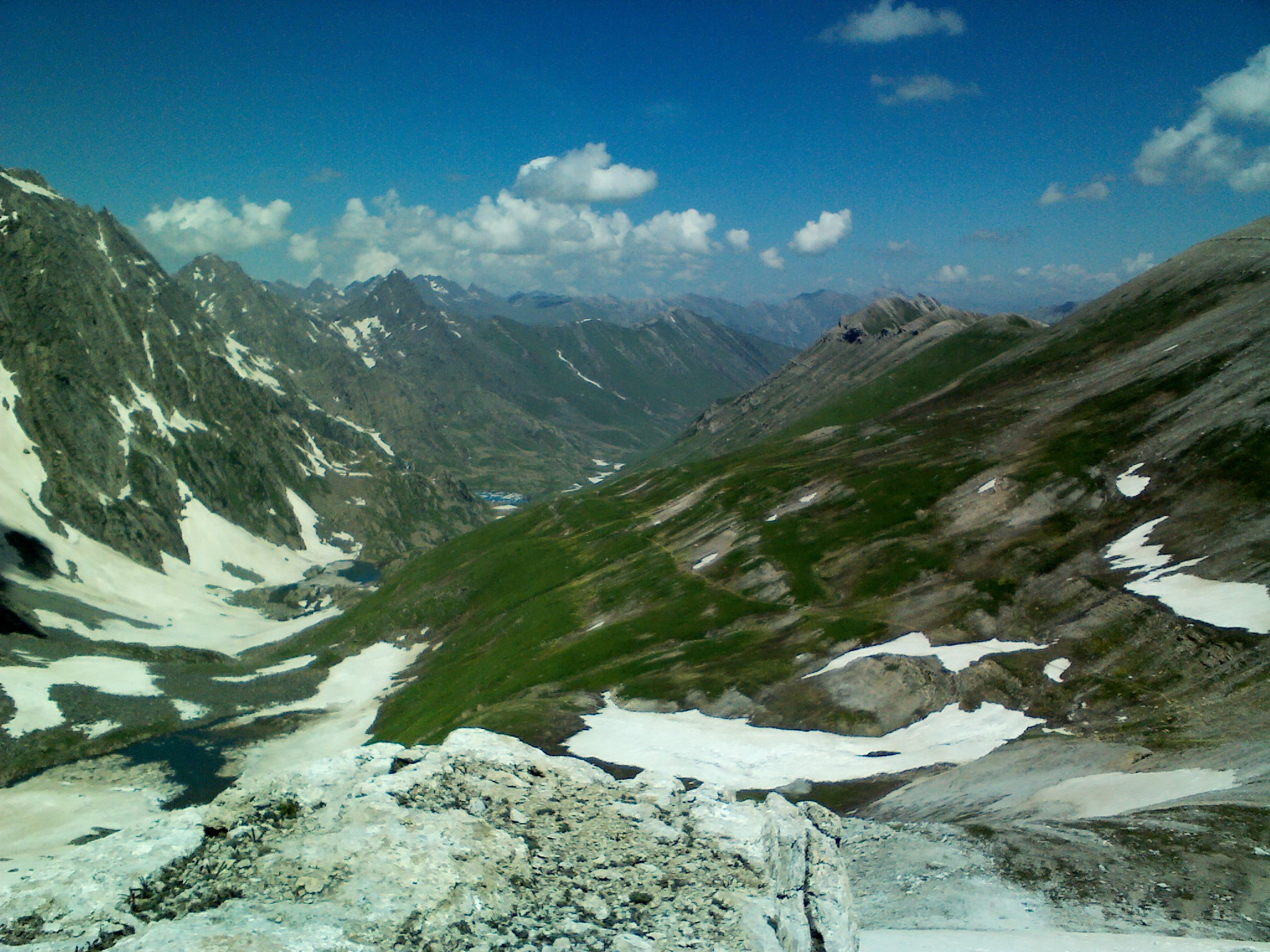
Gadsar Lake from the Gadsar Pass at mount Vishnu

Gadsar in Kashmiri means the lake of fishes, a natural habitat of trout and other types of fish including brown trout. Yemsar means 'Lake of Yama'. The lake freezes from November to April and is mostly covered by snow during these months, and floating icebergs are seen even in summer. It is surrounded by alpine meadows full of various kinds of wild alpine flowers, therefore, the lake is also called the 'Valley of Flowers'. The lake is mainly fed by the melting of glaciers. The Lake outflows through a stream flowing north-westwards that joins the Kishanganga River at Tulail.

== Access ==
The Gadsar Lake is situated 108 kilometres northeast of Srinagar . From Naranag, a 28km alpine track leads to the lake. Another track of 41km track leads northwest from Shitkadi Sonamarg, passing Vishansar and Krishansar Lakes, and crosses two mountain passes—Nichnai and Gadsar—both over 4100 meters above sea level. The best time to visit is from June to September.

== Gadsar, the lake of death ==
The Gadsar Lake is also called Yemsar, which means the lake of Yama, and is also referred to as the lake of death. This is a myth that remains unresolved. Shepherds grazing their flocks in the outskirts of Gadsar lake during summers believe that there lives a Lake Monster, a freshwater Octopus which drags the creatures from the shores by its tentacles into the water. There is an uncertainty in the minds of visitors, a kind of threat that prevents them from going near the shores. The shepherds also chose otherwise graze their flocks at the shores of the lake. Fish are typically caught outside the lake, in the stream through which it flows out.
