= Shikara =

Type of boat

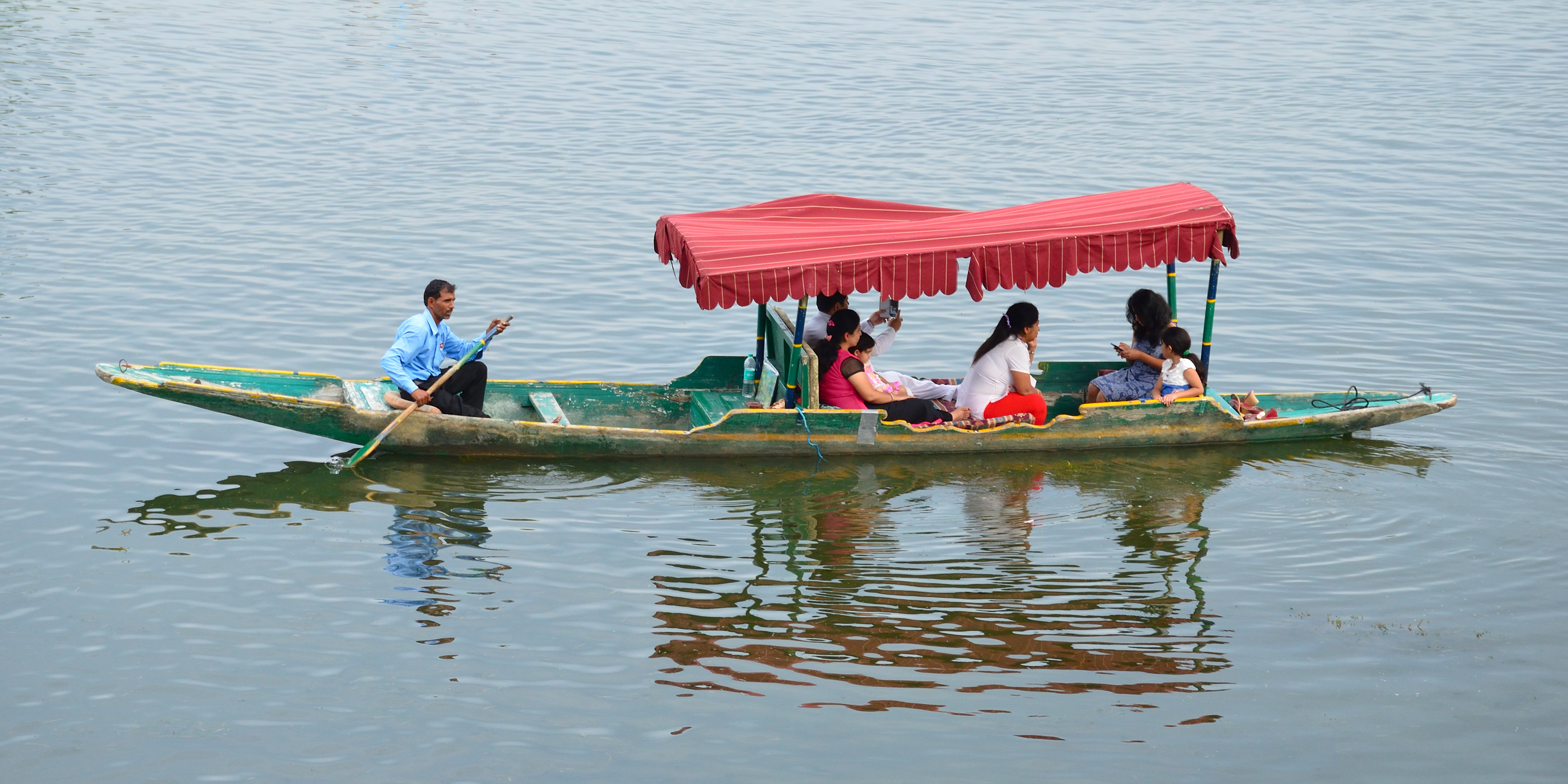
Shikara on the Sukhna Lake, Chandigarh

The shikara (Urdu pronunciation: [ʃɪkɑːɾɑː] ; Kashmiri pronunciation: [ʃikəːrʲ]) is a type of wooden boat found on Dal Lake and other water bodies of Srinagar, in the Indian union territory of Jammu and Kashmir. Shikaras are of various sizes and are used for multiple purposes, including transportation. A usual shikara seats six people, with the driver paddling at the rear. Like the Venetian gondolas, they are a cultural symbol of Kashmir. Some shikaras are still used for fishing, harvesting aquatic vegetation (usually for fodder), and transport, while most are covered with tarpaulins and are used by tourists. A Shikara ride in Dal Lake is a great way to experience the beauty of Dal Lake and get a glimpse into the life of the locals. Some are used as floating homes.

== Construction ==
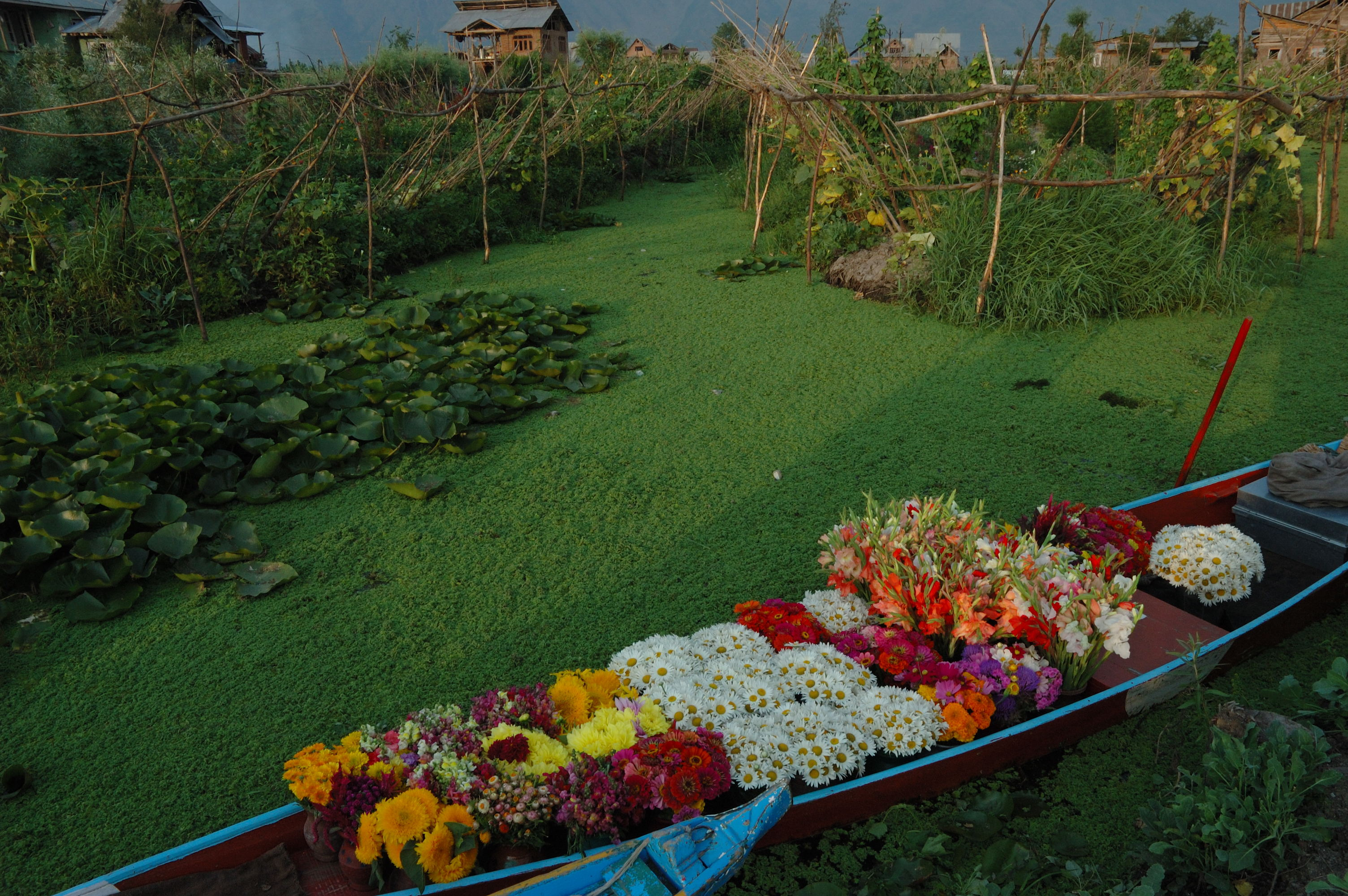
A Florist's shikara on Nageen Lake, Srinagar, Kashmir

The craft relies on deodar wood (which does not decompose in water) and ranges from 25 to 41 feet in length. The pointed front end is followed by a central section made of 8 planks of wood and the boat eventually ends in a flat rear segment. Two planks of wood lend to each of the side elevations a vertical height of 1.5 feet. It has a conspicuous spade shaped base.

The nails and iron clamps used for joinery are flush and fixed into the wood diagonally when they are red hot, to ensure stronger bonding. Care is taken to keep them hidden for the visual aesthetics of the boat. Caulking uses a paste containing poplar seed. The boat is created over 10 to 12 days.

Seating arrangements are organized in the central segment of the boat by positioning cushions and related upholstery over the built-in storage space underneath. A canopy is supported on four pillars. The centre and the ends are equipped with iron anchor rings and wooden pegs, which are used to fasten the shikara on the banks of the lake. The shikaras are eventually painted in bright colors and may further be polished, engraved and embellished.

== Use ==
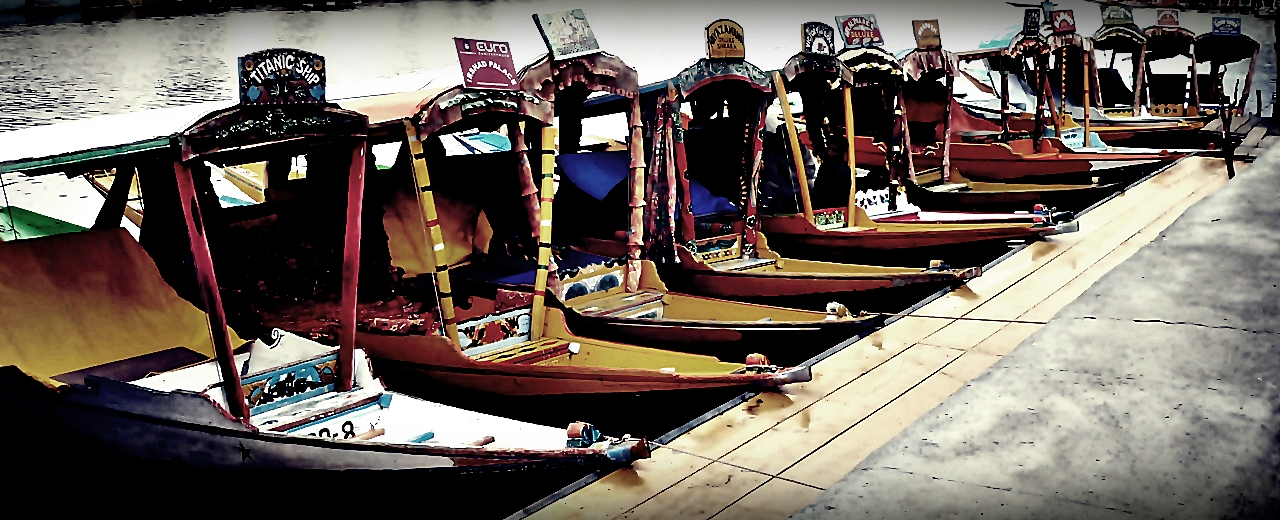
Shikara in a row at Dal Lake

The boats are often navigated by two boat men in phiran and they carry kangris (portable heaters) and have cushioned seats and back rests.

The long boats crowd the Srinagar lakes. They are used for getting back and forth from the houseboats or for longer tours of Dal Lake. Because the Dal is central to the landscape of Srinagar, many places of tourist interest have been built in its vicinity. Nishat and Shalimar gardens as well as the Hazratbal shrine are directly accessible by shikara. White-throated kingfishers, large birds with robust bills can be seen perched on the branches of willow trees. These birds concentrate their hunting on the floating Gardens. These man-made islands of reeds, willow rods and aquatic vegetation are held together with humus from the lake bottom providing a rich source of food in the form of frogs, lizards, mice, grasshoppers and other insects for wildlife. Though native to the Kashmir valley, shikaras can sometimes also be found on lakes in other parts of India due to their popularity among tourists.

== Gallery ==
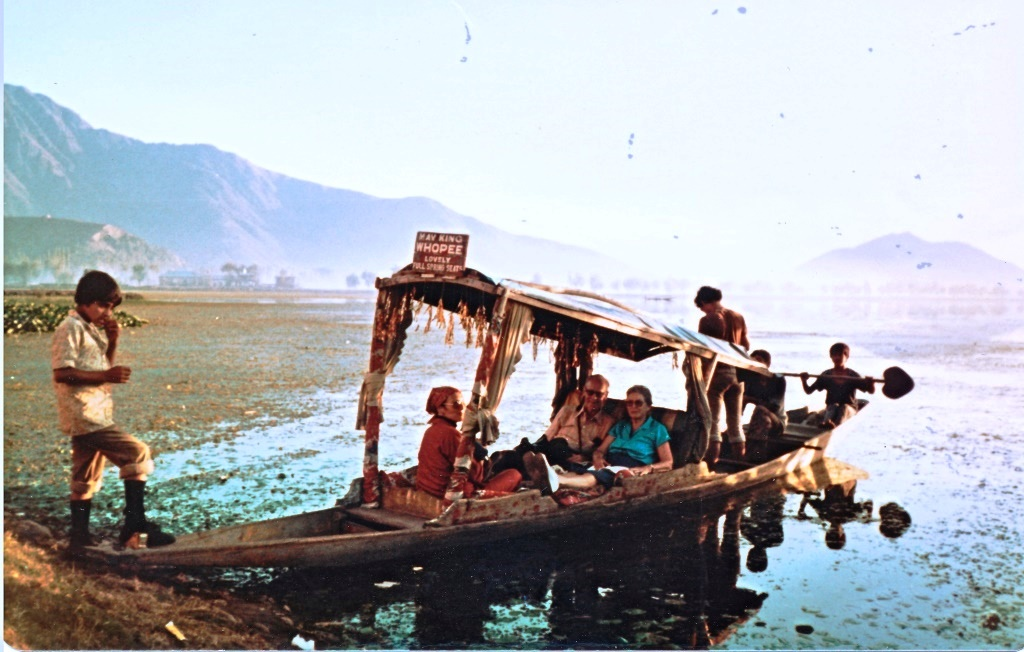
Shikara "Whoopee" setting off on Dal Lake

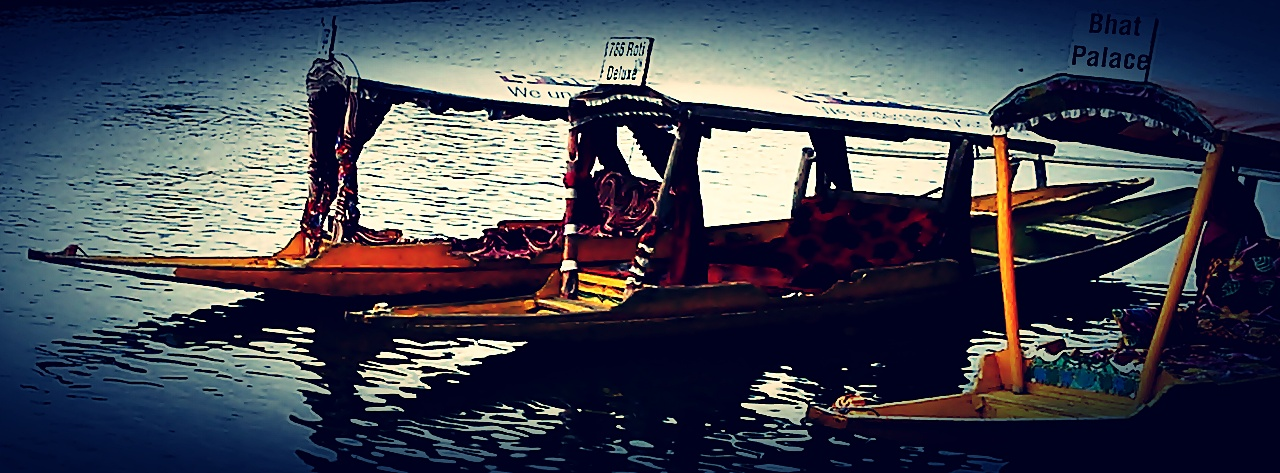
Shikaras at Dal Lake

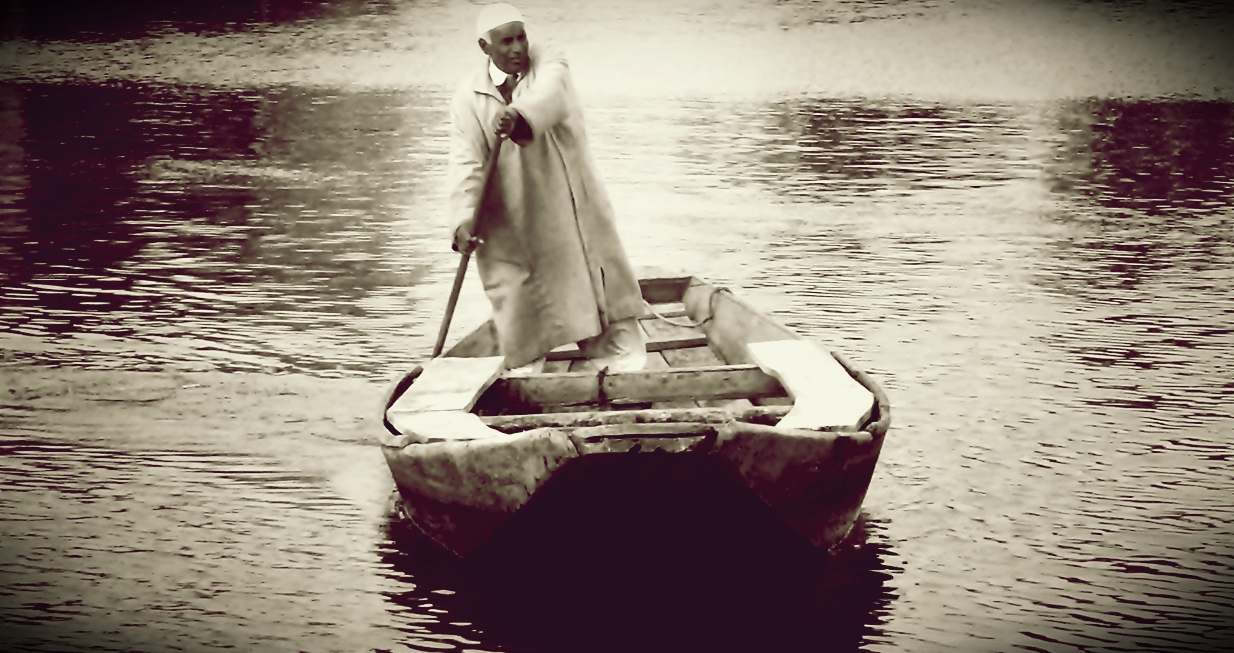
A man with his shikara

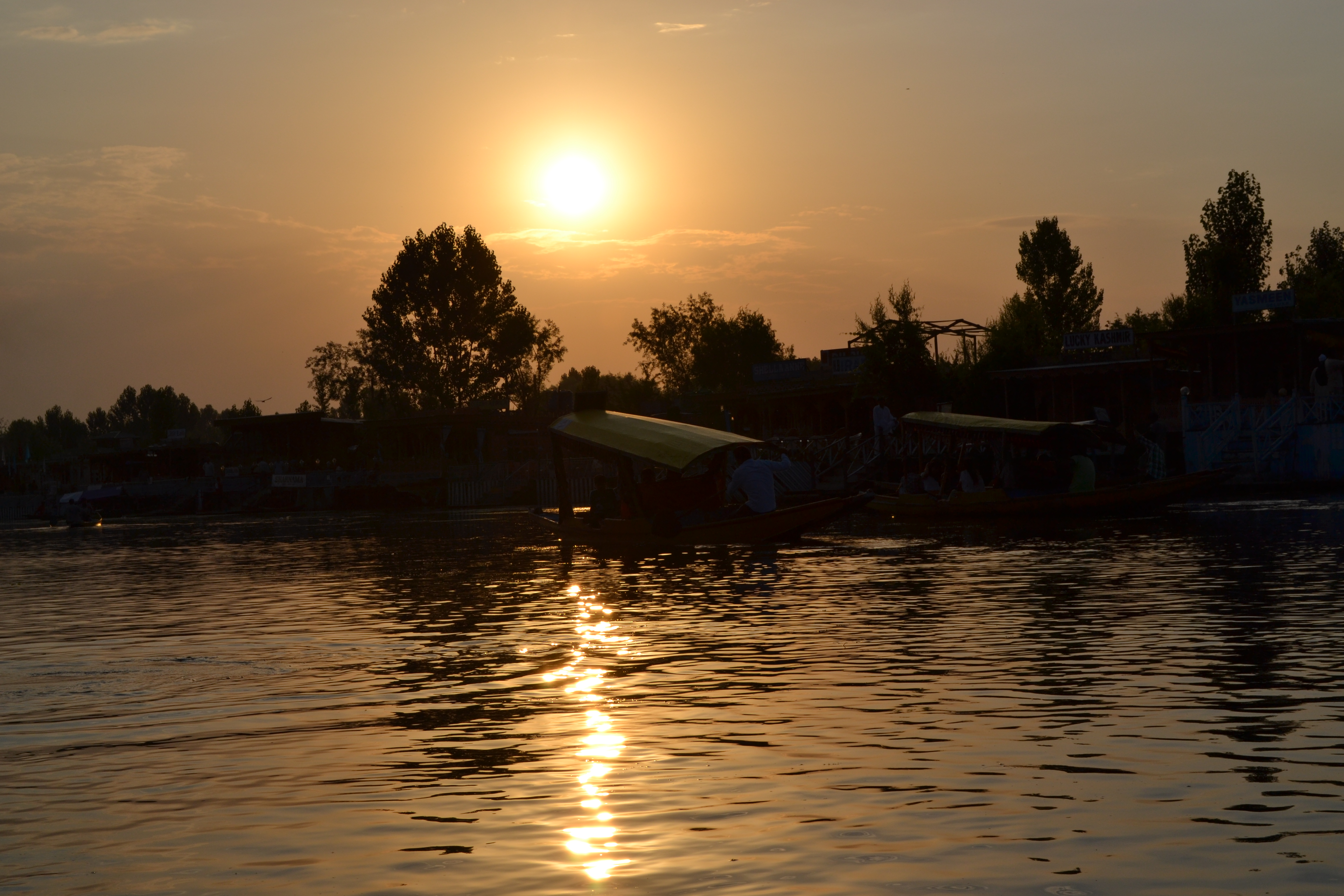
Shikara at sunset

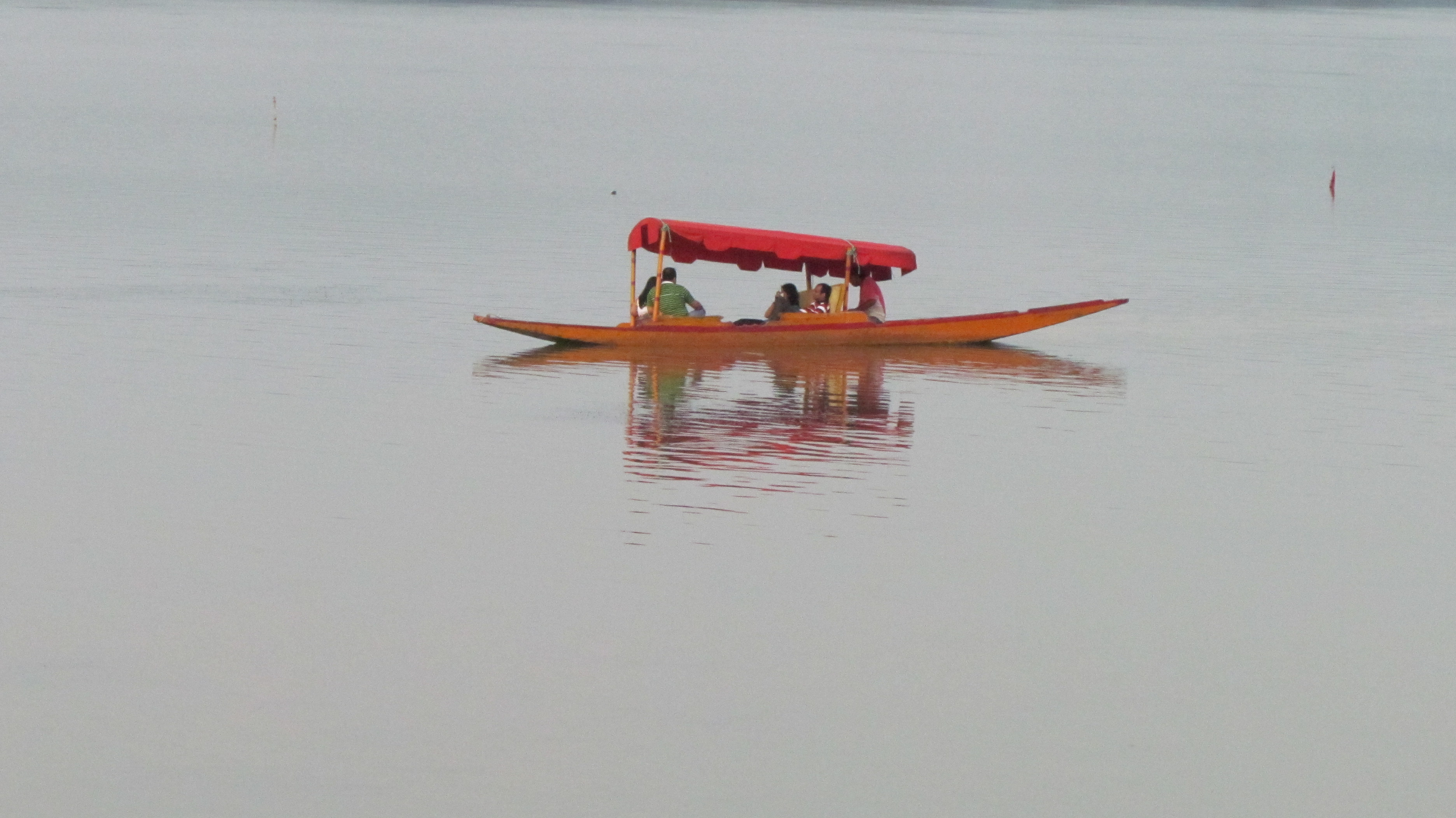
A sikhara on Sukhna Lake, Chandigarh

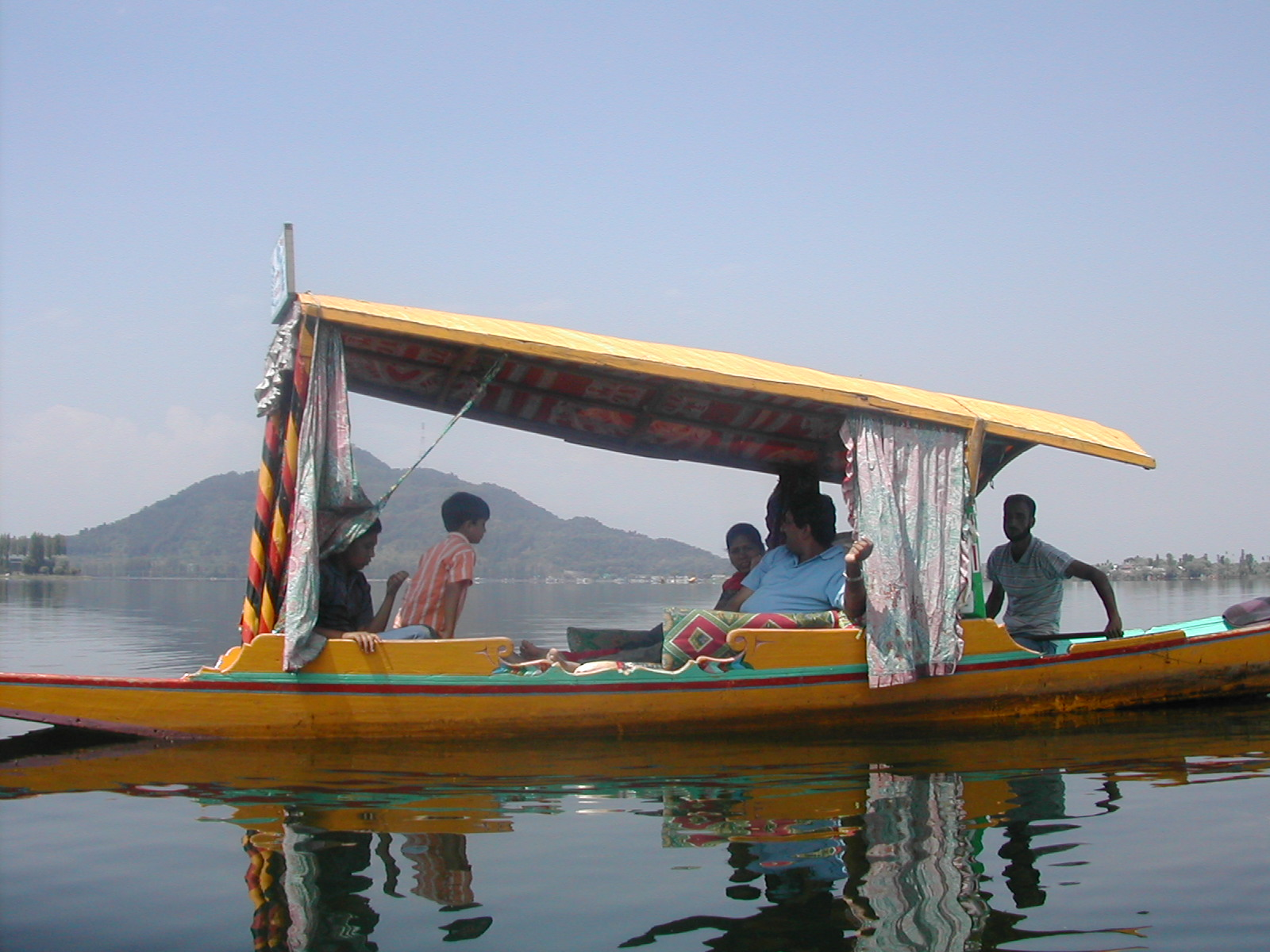
Shikara of Dal Lake

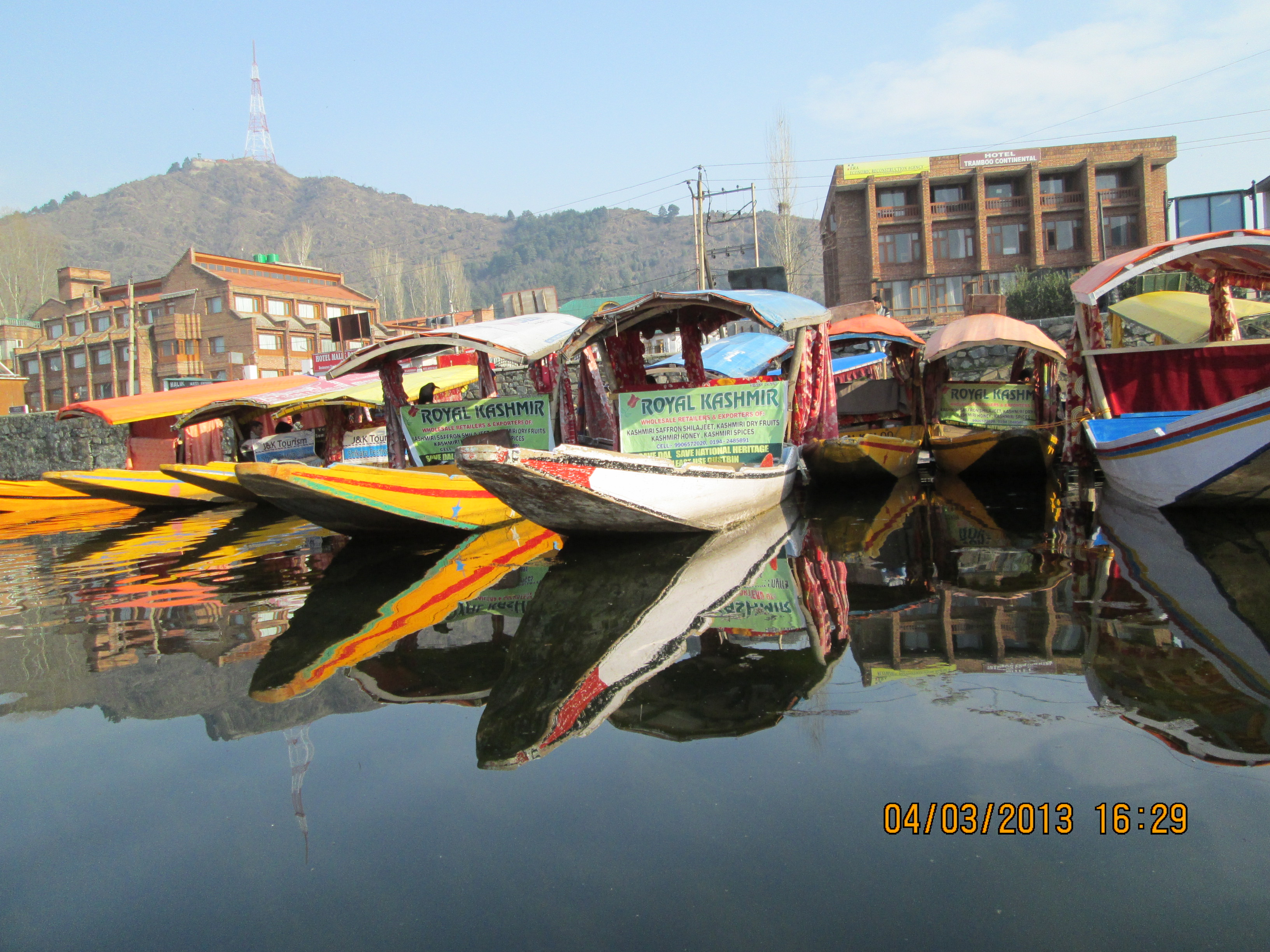
Shikara of Dal Lake

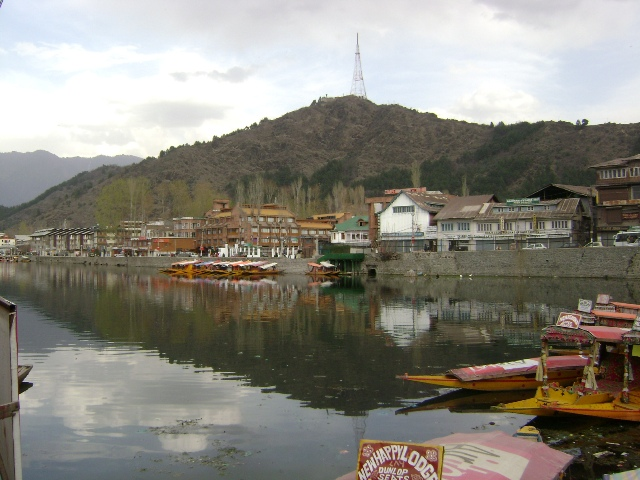
Shikaras of Dal Lake

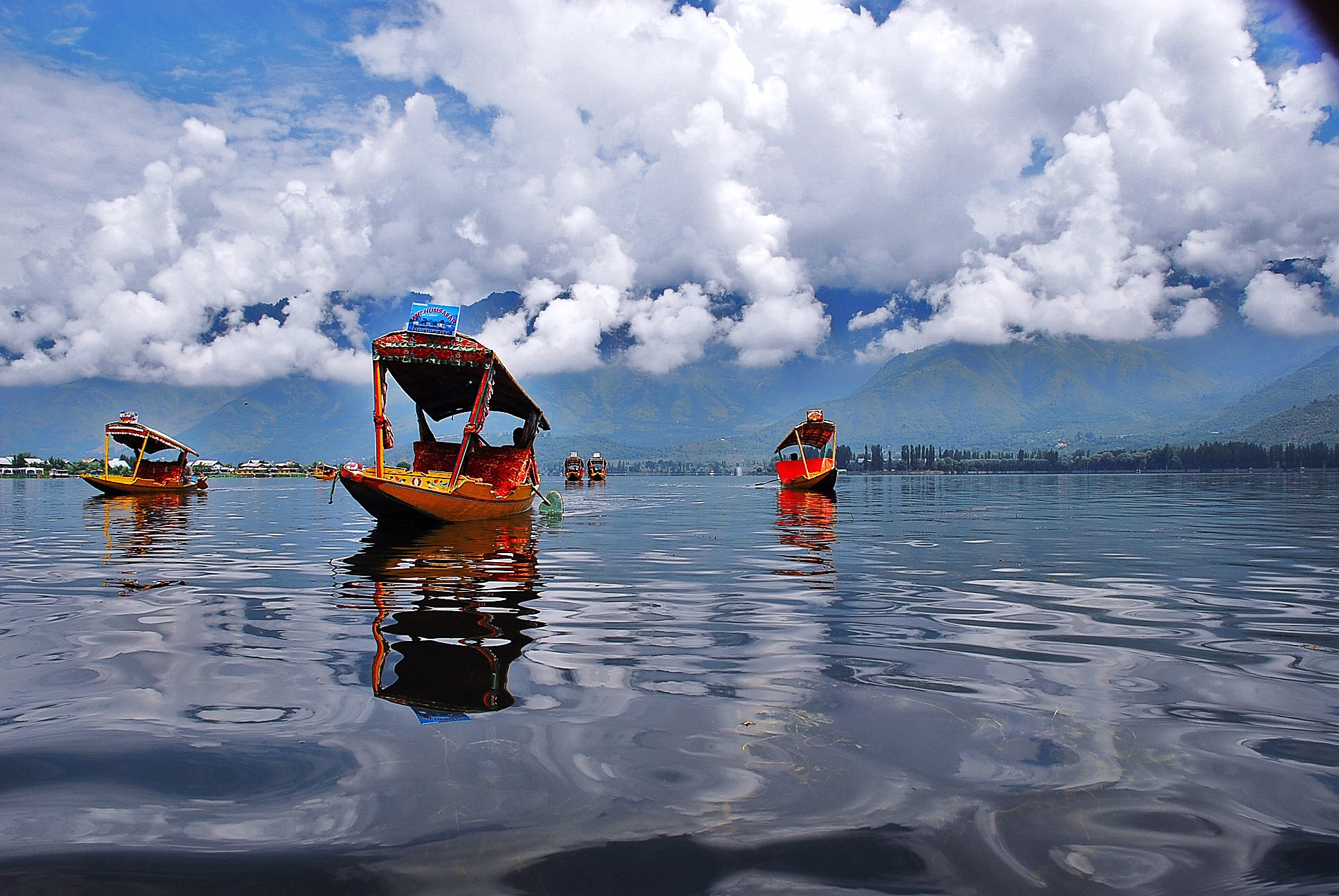
Shikaras of Dal Lake

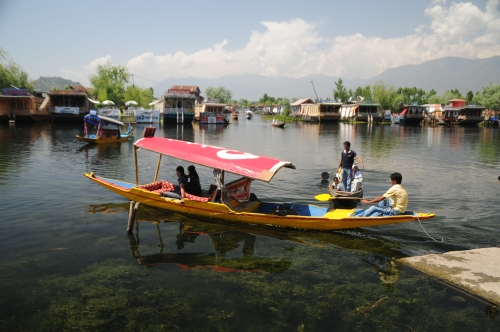
Shikara of Dal Lake

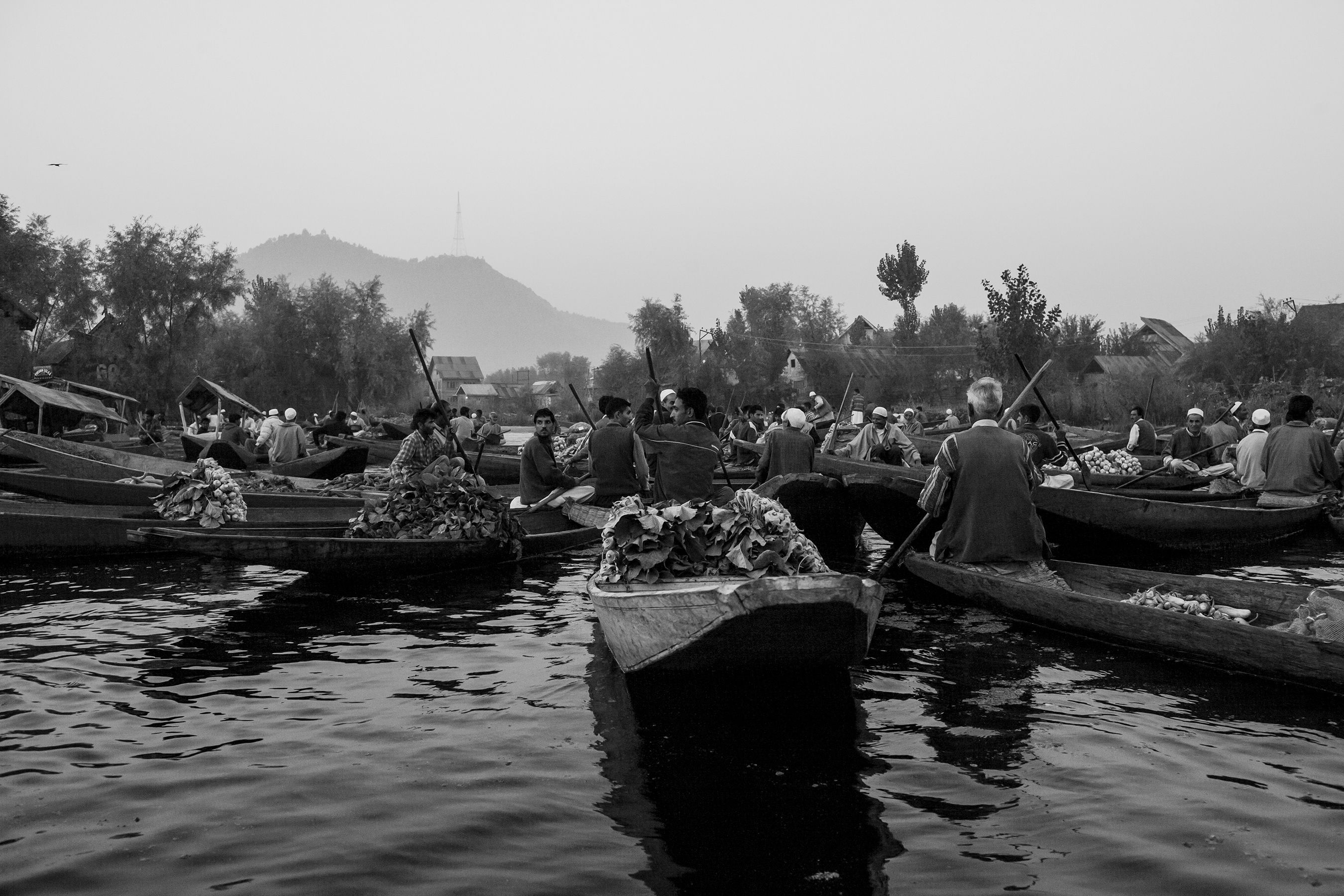
The floating vegetable market on Dal Lake

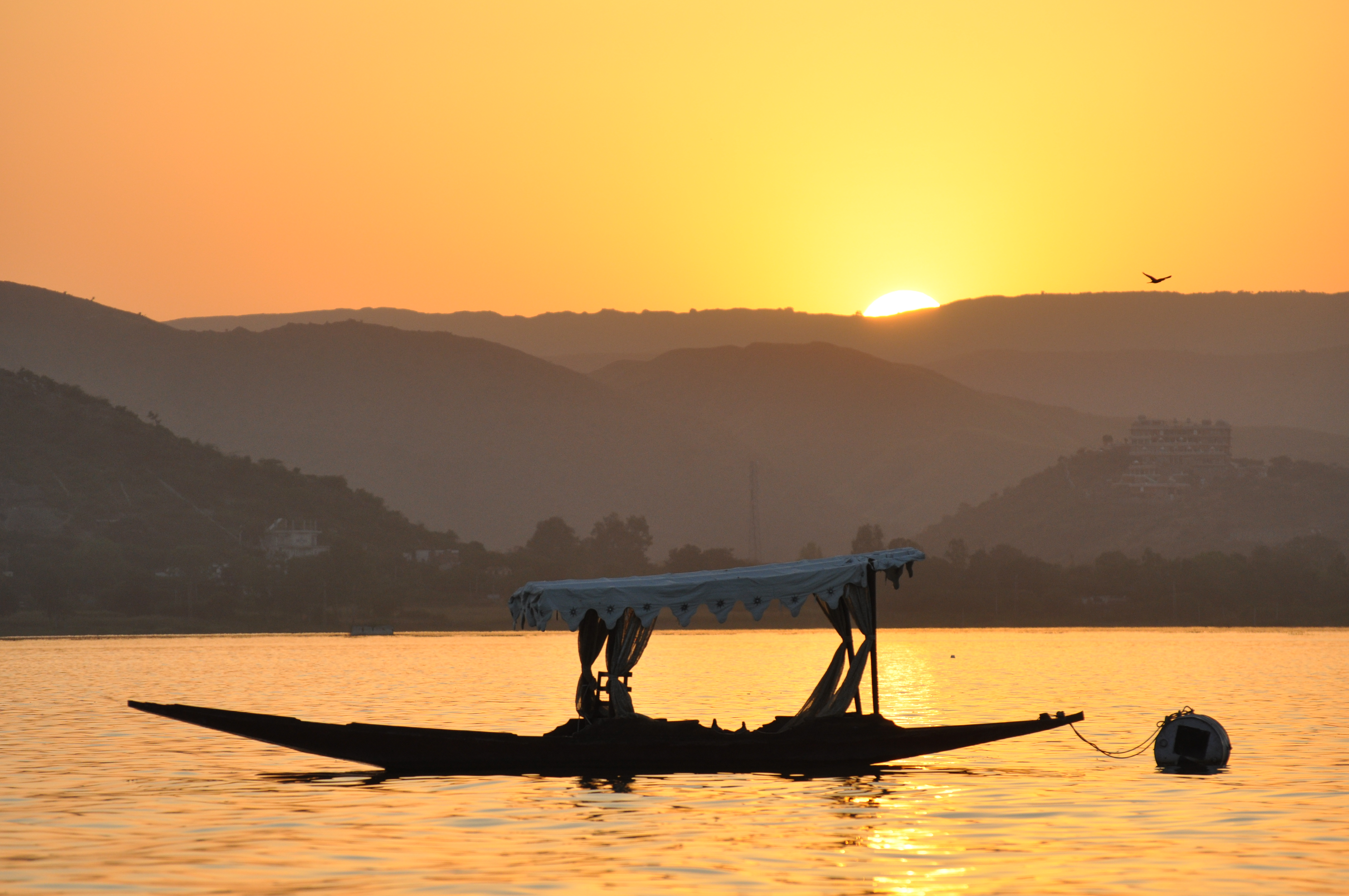
A shikara on Lake Pichola, Udaipur, Rajasthan
