= Bramrachokh =

Mythical creature from Kashmiri folklore

In Kashmiri mythology, Bramrachokh (Kashmiri pronunciation: [bramraːt͡ʃoːkʰ], also written as Bramarācōkh or Rachok) is a demon or mythical creature who inhabits desolate areas and fools travellers by pretending to be a light, in the manner of a will-o'-the-wisp.

Bramrachokh has a pot full of fire balanced on his head, and on his forehead a strong, shining eye. It is said that if a traveller encounters Bramrachokh's light in a remote location, it will lead them to a ditch or a cave, or to their death. Village children who see lights burning and extinguishing in the distance sometimes attribute this to Bramrachokh.

== See also ==
- Chillai Kalan – 40 days of intense cold in Kashmir
- Rantas – Mythological creature in Kashmiri folklore
