= Kashmiri mythology =

Kashmiri mythology refers to the assimilation of folklore, myths, and legends associated with the Kashmir valley. Kashmiri mythology has an array of mythical creatures ranging from Yach, Vigin, Bramrachokh, Rantas, Pasukh, etc. For instance, Himal and Nagaray is one of the most popular folklore in Kashmir.

== See also ==
- Chillai Kalan – 40 days of intense cold in Kashmir
