= Oksangor =

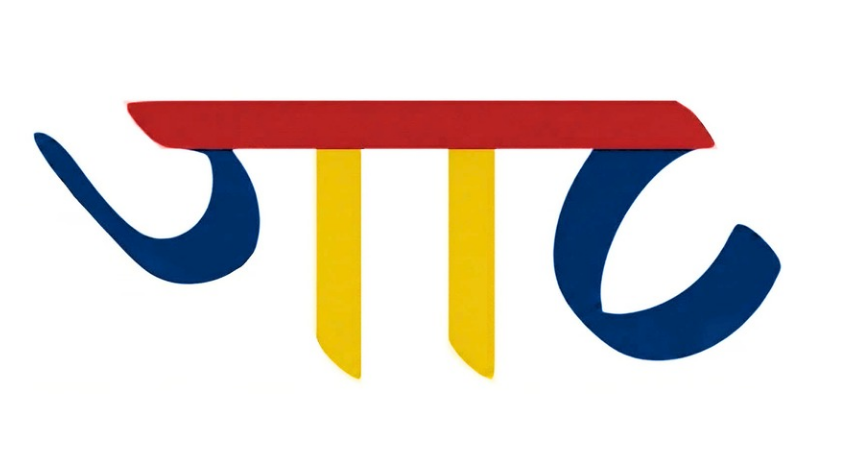
Oksangor (Horizontal red line represents consonants, two vertical yellow lines represent vowels and two blue curves represent a plough

Oksangor (𑇚) (Kashmiri pronunciation: [ok saŋɡoːr]; also known as Okᵘ sangōr or Okᵘ saṁ gōr) is the Kashmiri name of a special Śāradā symbol. It was written at the beginning of alphabet books in Kashmiri schools. The symbol formed part of the auspicious opening phrase that was used in order to wish for good fortune and success in learning.The symbol also acquired profound philosophical significance in Kashmiri Śaivism. Traditional interpretations describe it as representing the entire alphabet, with its different components symbolizing Śiva, Śakti, the vowels, the consonants, and ultimately the whole universe as an expression of non dual reality. Some modern scholars, however, suggest that it may originally have been a scribal or punctuation mark used to begin important texts, whose practical purpose gradually evolved into a sacred symbol. Today, this symbol stands as an enduring emblem of Kashmir's rich heritage, uniting its script, scholarship, spirituality, and philosophy in a single sign.

== Gallery ==
Kashmiri wooden piece with chinar motifs and oksangor at top

== See also ==
- Kashmiri mythology
- Kashmiri culture
