= Pulhoer =

Type of footwear worn in Kashmir

Pulhoer, variously spelled pulhoor, pulhord, pulhour, or pulhor, is an ancient traditional straw footwear of Kashmir, bearing similarities to chappal or slippers, but unlike sandals, pulhoer is plain, lacks heels, and therefore differs from sandals. One type of traditional kashmiri straw footwear is also known as khraav. The shoes were/ are homemade by Kashmir artisans by weaving straw rope in a particular manner.

They were widely used by Kashmiris in ancient times especially during winter season. The pulhoer straw footwear was one of the traditional tools for dealing with the cold of Kashmir's winter, like (still are) also the kanger, the portable heating-pot, and the coatlike garment pheran.

They were primarily used by people to protect their feet from snow due to poverty and unavailability of modern footwear in the region, but since there was a lack of modern garments, people also used them for protection against thorny bushes and pebbles in forests; however they are unstable or unusable in the rainy season due to flow of rain through their pores.

== History ==
The exact place and date of origin of the pulhoer straw footwear is not known. It is part of the traditional culture of Kashmir, having been extensively used there before industrialisation. Following productivity-improving technologies, mechanization and economic improvement, pulhoer began to disappear from the region. The tradition still exists in remote areas.

== Structure ==
Pulhoer are entirely made of straw, which makes them unusable in the wet season.

Khraav, another type of pulhoer, are also made of straw, but have soles made of wood or pareve, preventing slipping on snow.

== See also ==
- List of shoe styles
- Pheran
- Chillai Kalan
- Qaleen
