= Heat pack =

Heat pack may refer to:

- a heating pad
- a version of an ice pack that is heated

== See also ==
- Hand warmer
