= Harisse =

Kashmiri mutton dish

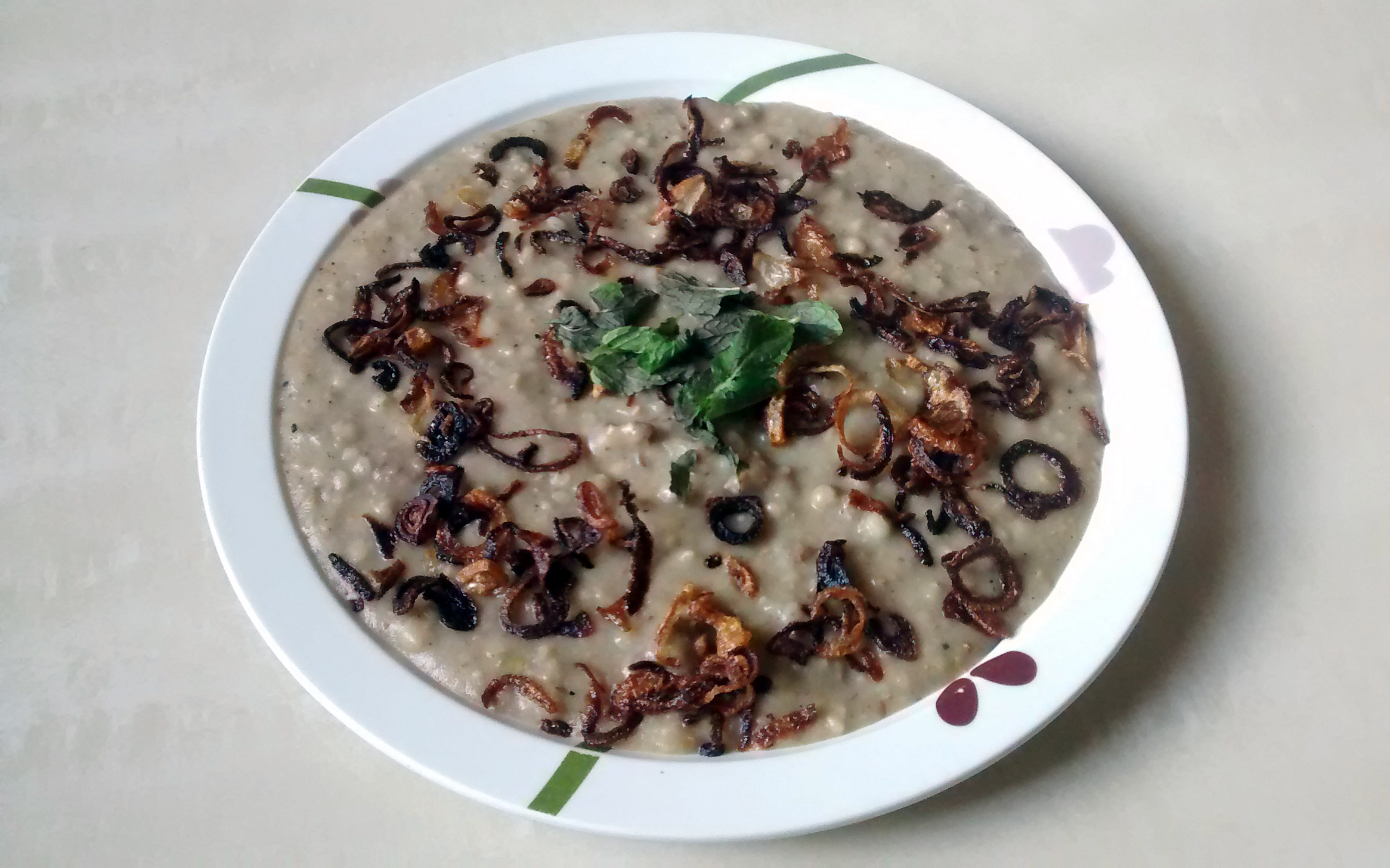
- Harisse
- Type: Meat dish
- Place of origin: Kashmir
- Region or state: Kashmir Valley
- Serving temperature: Hot
- Main ingredients: Mutton, Rice

Harisse (Kashmiri pronunciation: [hərʲsɨ]) is a traditional slow-cooked mutton dish from the Kashmir Valley. It is a seasonal staple primarily prepared during the winter months, specifically during Chillai Kalan. The dish is prepared using mutton, rice and a blend of spices cooked to a paste-like consistency and is traditionally served with girda, a local Kashmiri flatbread.

== History ==
Kashmiri Harisse is regarded as a culinary link between the Kashmir Valley and Persia (modern-day Iran). While the dish shares a linguistic root with the Middle Eastern Harees, the Kashmiri variation evolved uniquely following its introduction to the region, likely during the 14th century.

Historical accounts often credit the introduction of the dish to Central Asian influences brought by Sufi missionaries or by Mirza Muhammad Haidar Dughlat, a military general and governor who ruled Kashmir in the 16th century. Originally considered a delicacy reserved for royalty and the elite, it gradually transitioned into a vital seasonal staple for the general population to combat the sub-zero temperatures of the Kashmiri winter.
