= Taranga (clothing) =

Headscarf worn by Kashmiri women

Taranga (Kashmiri pronunciation: [tarɨnɡɨ]) is the typical headscarf worn by Kashmiri Pandit women until the late 1960s.

Now its only place is as a ritual and by tradition to be worn in a classical way on the bride's head as a bridal gear on her wedding day. This headwear has a very significant and historical importance and relevance, as it was an appreciation reward from Jagadguru Adi Shankaracharya to daughter-in-law of Brahman's who discussed the Shakti doctrine with him. He was pleased with her mastery of the subject and awarded her a scull cap called 'Taranga' to dress the head. Before the arrival of sari to Kashmir, almost every Kashmiri Pandit lady used to wear scull cap 'Taranga'. It gradually faded away with the advent of Indian and Western dresses. Nowadays this 'Taranga' is worn by Kashmiri Pandit bride's during their marriages only. After mass migration from Kashmir valley apart from 'Taranga' two other traditional things remained with them, which are Pheran and Dejhoor.
