= Pheran Day =

Annual day celebrated in Kashmir

Pheran Day (also International Pheran Day or World Pheran Day) is celebrated in Kashmir on 21 December as first day of Chillai Kalan.

== History ==
The Pheran Day is celebrated for the preservation of tradition of wearing Pheran. In 2021, i.e December 2021, members of The Jammu and Kashmir Economic Confederation (JKEC) and JKAS officer Zeeshan Khan (Asstt Director Tourism Kashmir) assembled at Ghanta Ghar Lal Chowk to observe 'Pheran Day'. Bollywood actor Anupam Kher also wished Kashmiri people on "World Pheran Day." In 2022, Pheran Day was celebrated at historic Ghanta Ghar. The main aim of this day was to popularise the loose-and-long woollen gown worn to fight the biting cold as the minimum temperature hovers below sub-zero in various parts of Kashmir valley. Various tourists and locals cat-walked near Lal Chowk to promote "wearing Pheran".
