= Pheran =

Kashmiri traditional dress

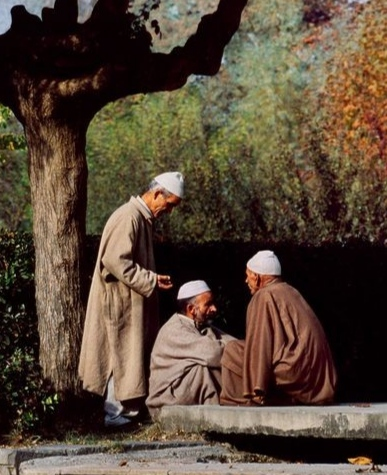
- A group of Kashmiri men wearing the Pheran from Kashmir Valley
- Type: Traditional dress
- Material: Wool and cotton
- Place of origin: Kashmir, India

Pheran (Kashmiri pronunciation: [pʰʲaran]) or Phiran is the traditional outfit for both males and females in the Kashmir Valley of Jammu and Kashmir, India.

The pheran consists of two gowns, one over the other. The traditional pheran extends to the feet, which was popular up to the late 19th century C.E. However, a relatively modern variation of the pheran extends to below the knees, which is worn with a suthan inside (loose form of salwar) similar to the styles worn in Afghanistan.

In summer, the pheran is made of cotton, but in winter, the pheran is made of wool, covering and protecting the body from the cold, especially during snow. These dresses are used by the residents of the Kashmir Valley, Kashmiris residing in Chenab Valley along with some regions of Dras in Ladakh.

Since Pheran is unique to the Kashmiri culture and is worn particularly to protect oneself from the coldest phase (Chillai Kalan, which starts from 21st December) in winter, 21st December is now being celebrated as Pheran Day in the Kashmir Valley.

== Etymology and history ==
The word pheran is derived from the Persian word perahan (Persian: پیراهن, romanized: pērāhan, lit. 'cloak, shirt'). The outfit has been in vogue in Kashmir since before the 15th century.

Before the advent of Islam, the people of Kashmir used to wear a loose gown-type leather doublet instead of pheran, as recorded by Xuanzang.

According to some sources, the pheran was introduced by Mughal emperor Akbar when he conquered the valley in 1586. However, according to historian Prithivi Nath Kaul Bamzai, with the arrival of Sufi saints and Muslim theologians from the Greater Iran and Central Asia, Kashmiris adopted their long robes and round turbans. The long robe, in particular, is considered the precursor to the Pheran, which is now the traditional attire of Kashmiris.

== Designs ==
=== Head dress ===
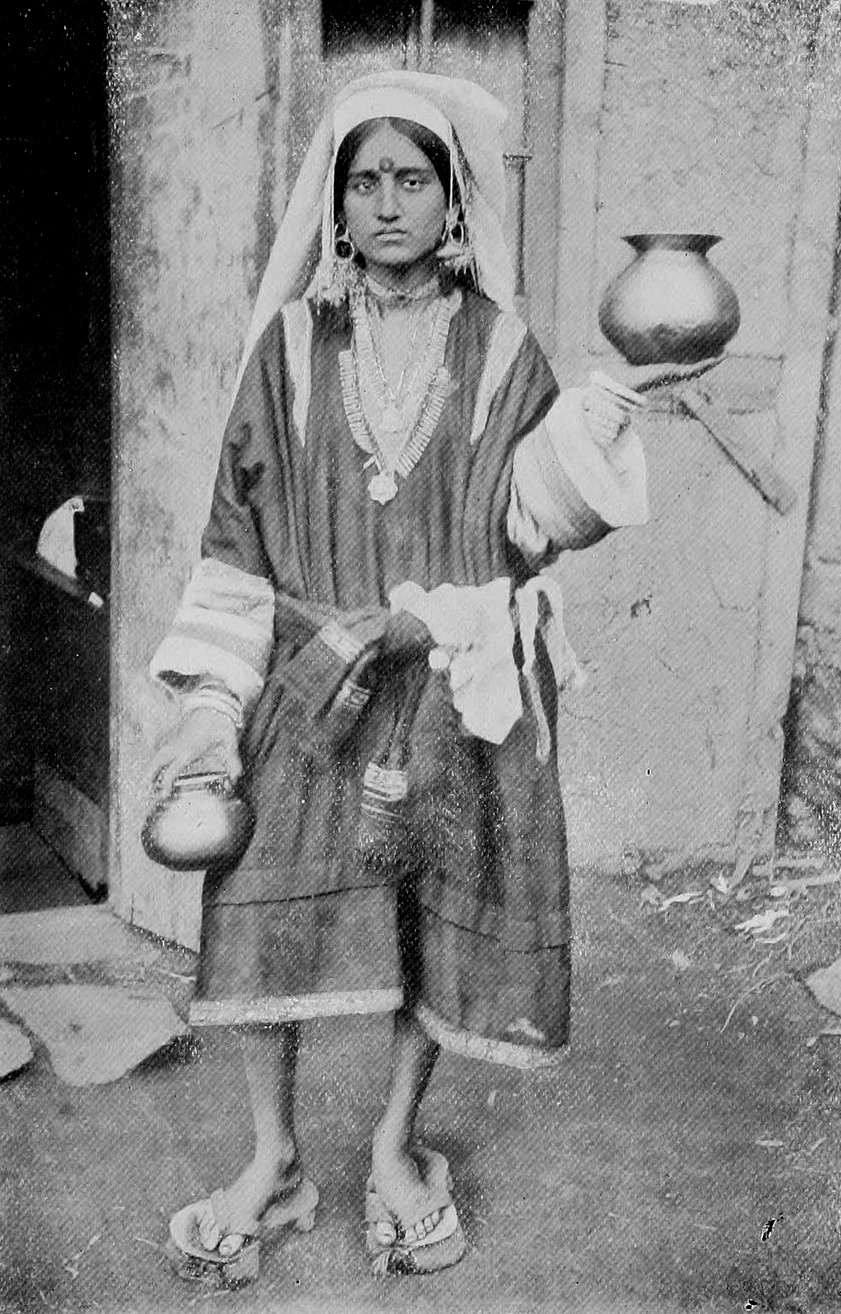
Pheran worn by a Kashmiri Pandit woman, 1922

Taranga

Hindu women use a headwear called "taranga" (Kashmiri pronunciation: [tarɨnɡɨ]), which is a headdress that becomes smaller at the back, towards the heels. It is popular in some areas of Kashmir.

Qasaba

Kashmiri Muslim women use a headwear known as the "qasaba" or "kasaba" (Kashmiri pronunciation: [qasaːbɨ]). The qasaba is padded by means of a turban and is pinned together by brooches. A veil made of pashmina or Silk is pinned to the top of the qasaba that descends towards the back of the neck. There are two types of qasaba: "Thoud qasaba" and "Bonn qasaba". Thoud qasaba (high qasaba) sits on the head like a crown, worn only by married women belonging to elite families. House of khwajawal in Naid kadal made the most beautiful qasabas. Bonn qasaba (low qasaba) sits on head like a bandana, worn by commoners and tribal women. The most magnificent and expensive qasabas were made of Kashmiri kundan work known as "Jarrah": precious gem stones, usually rubies, spinels and emerald are set in 24 carat gold to make various kundan ornaments (Tikka, Ta'weez, Hung ta'weez, Bal hor, kan wass) pinned to the red cap having intricate Kashmiri "Tilla work" (silver thread work). Kundan qasaba was worn only by royals. Kundan qasaba were only made by house of Kundanghar in Khwaja bazaar.

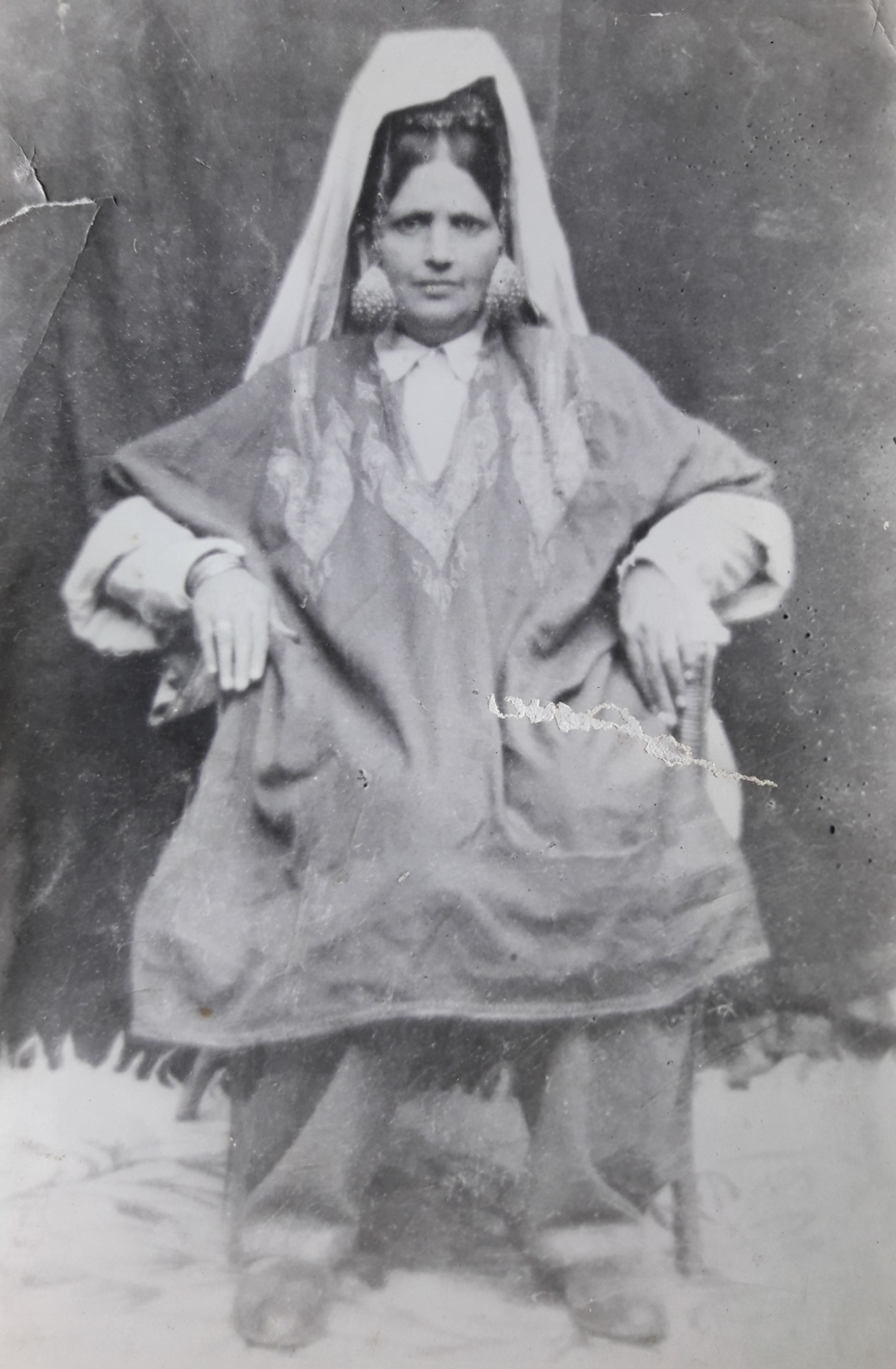
Begum Mehtab of House Khwajawal wearing Kundan qasaba and bal hourr (kundan earrings).

=== Pheran ===
The pheran is a loose upper garment loosely gathered at the sleeves, which tend to be wide, made of either wool or jamewar, which is a mixture of wool and cotton, with no side slits. A pheran made of wool is called a 'loch'. Female pheran dresses are designed with colourful, flower-like design elements and styles. Male pheran dresses are quite simple, without any colourful design.

The traditional pheran falls to the feet like a gown. This style was universally worn by the Kashmiri Hindu and Kashmiri Muslim communities into the later 19th century C.E. However, a modern version worn by Muslims is knee-length, loose and stitched on the front side ane finishes, while Hindus often still wear their pherans long, extending down the legs. Ankle length Pherans are tied at the waist. Intricate embroideries or flower styles are popular on Kashmiri ladies' pherans. The embroideries or flower designs are made of thin metal threads; this kind of embroidery is known as 'Tille' in the Kashmiri language.

Over time, the art of embellishing pherans has evolved, with a variety of embroidery styles enhancing their elegance. Some of the most prominent embroidery types found on modern pherans include:

- Tilla embroidery – Traditional Kashmiri gold or silver threadwork, popular on festive and bridal pherans.
- Aari embroidery – Intricate chain-stitch embroidery, giving the pheran a refined, handcrafted look.
- Zari embroidery – A delicate and luxurious style using gold or silver threads, similar to Tilla but often more intricate.
- Sozni embroidery – A fine needlework technique, used mainly to enhance woollen pherans with artistic patterns.

With time, designers and artisans have introduced new styles, blending tradition with modern aesthetics, making the pheran a versatile outfit worn for both casual and festive occasions.

=== Poots ===
The poots (Kashmiri pronunciation: [poːt͡sʰ]) is the same as the pheran but made of lighter material; it is worn beneath the pheran. It is generally used to protect the pheran from burns from the kangri. It also provides extra warmth during winters, double-layer insulation from the cold winter days.

=== Suthan/Shalwar ===
Traditionally, the pheran and poots were worn without a lower garment. Indeed, in neighbouring Hunza too, women did not wear pajamas until 1890 and in Nagar until 1925. Since the latter part of the 19th century, loose suthans (salwars) and churidar pyjamas of the Punjab became popular in Kashmir. Accordingly, the suthan or churidar pajama can form part of the pheran ensemble but is not a must. The Kashmiri suthan is baggy and loose and is similar to the Dogri suthan worn in the Jammu region. Some versions are similar to the salwars worn in Afghanistan. However, since the 1960s, the straight-cut Punjabi salwar has become popular.

== Modern fashion ==
Modern trends saw a decline in the use of pherans in favour of the shalwar kameez. However, there has been a revival in recent years as pherans have become part of modern fashion, and are worn by females of other areas of Kashmir as well. Kashmiri men are also wearing the pheran as a fashionable outfit. Combined with jeans, the pheran has made its way into the office world. The modern pheran is not as wide and long as the traditional ankle or knee-length version and sometimes has side slits. Fewer men are wearing the phiran with a shalwar. Modern pherans, known as Raglan Pherans (LARK) are a hybrid of western raglan coat and traditional wear.

== Photo gallery ==
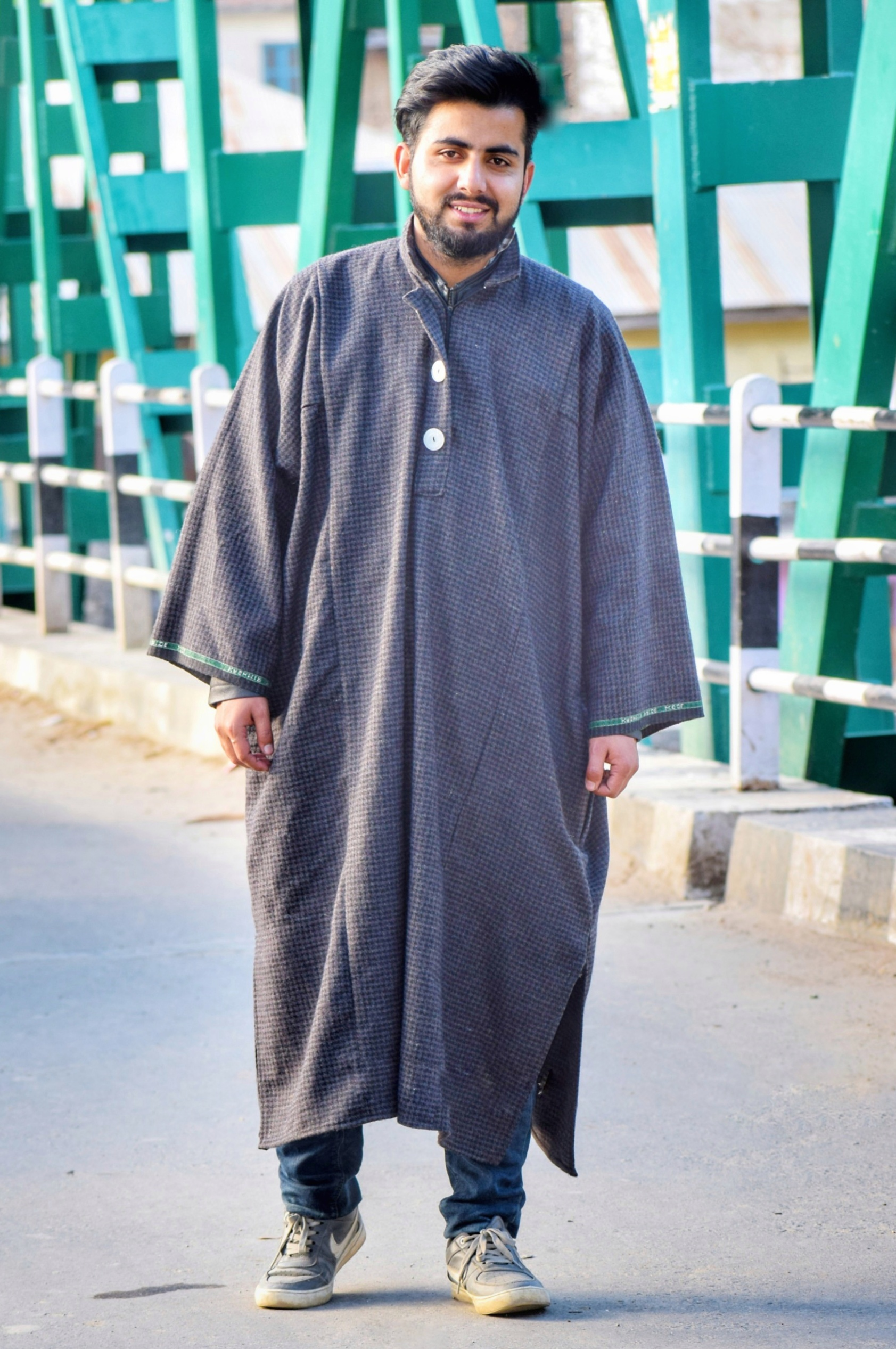
A young Kashmiri man wearing Pheran somewhere in Chenab Valley's Doda district

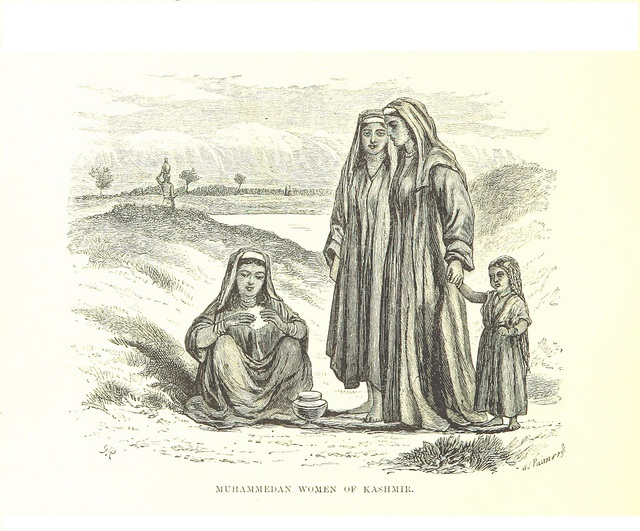
Kashmiri Muslim women in traditional long pheran, 1870

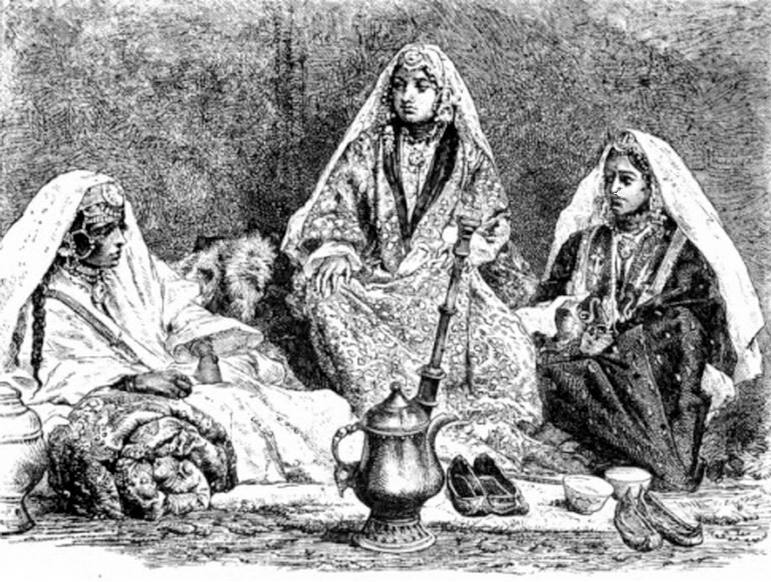
1919 drawing of Kashmiri Pandit women wearing intricately decorated pherans

Kashmiri Pandit men in Kashmir, 1895

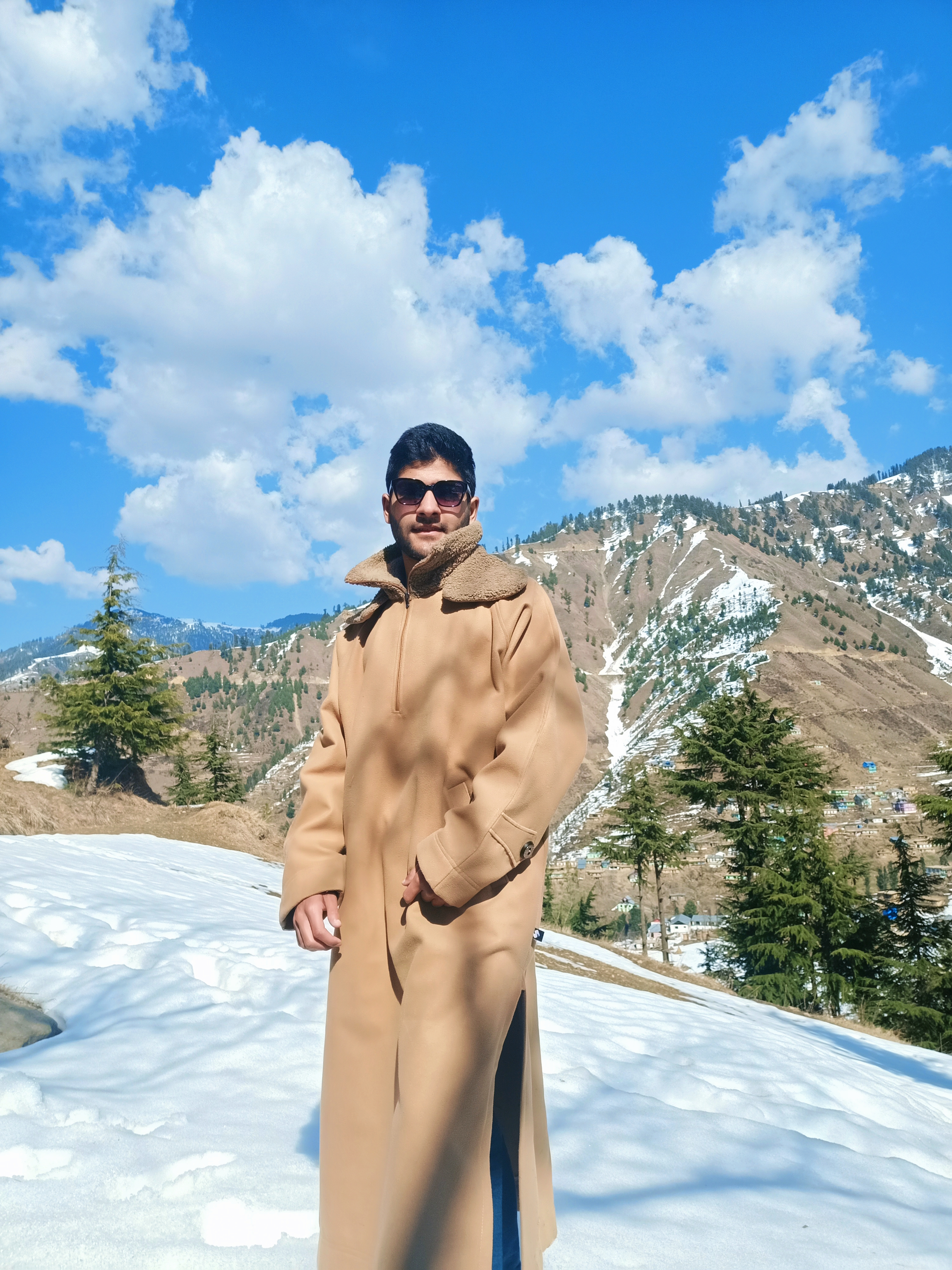
A young man wearing a fitted, fur-collared, fashionable Pheran in Chenab Valley's Bhaderwah

== See also ==
- Shalwar kameez
- Pulhoer
- Kashmiris
