= Hand warmer =

Small packet that produces heat

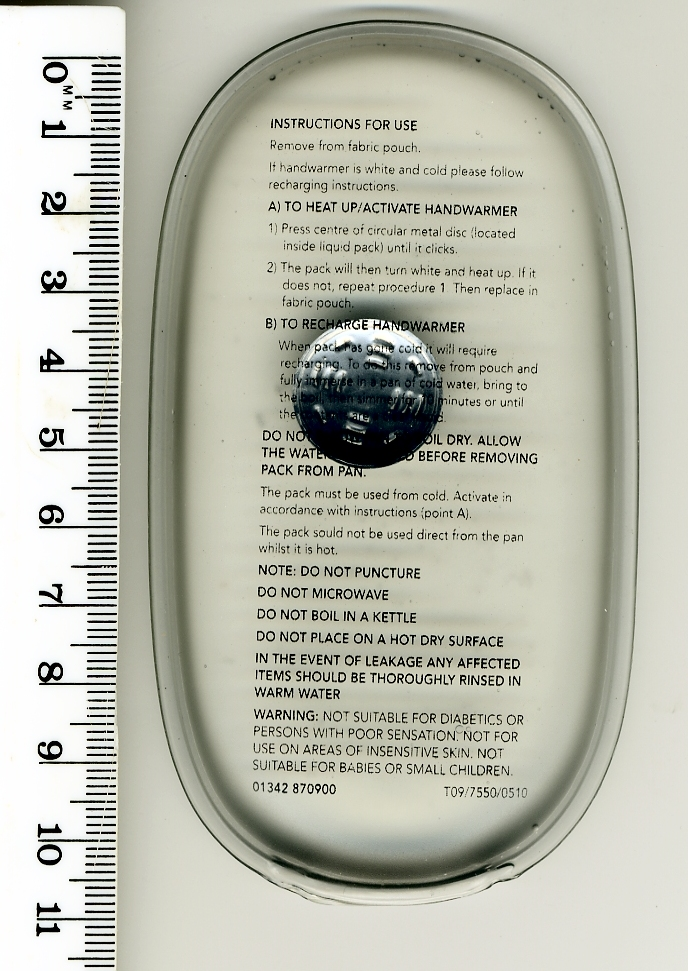
Crystallisation-type hand warmer with scale showing metal disc trigger

Hand warmers are small, often disposable, packets that produce heat to warm cold hands. They are used throughout the world in a variety of ways, including outdoor recreation, manual labor, and homelessness.

== History ==
Footwarmers heated with coal, or wood were in common use by 1800.

The hand and foot warmer was first patented by Jonathan T. Ellis of New Jersey in 1891, though no evidence exists that it was ever produced.

The first commercially produced hand warmer was created by Japanese inventor Niichi Matoba. Matoba received a patent for applying the principle of an oxidation reaction that produces heat by means of platinum catalysis. He then devoted his time to researching how to make the product suitable for practical use. In 1923, he manufactured a prototype of his device naming it HAKUKIN-kairo (HAKKIN warmer). A version of these original portable hand warmers is still produced in Japan.

== Types ==
=== Iron oxidation ===
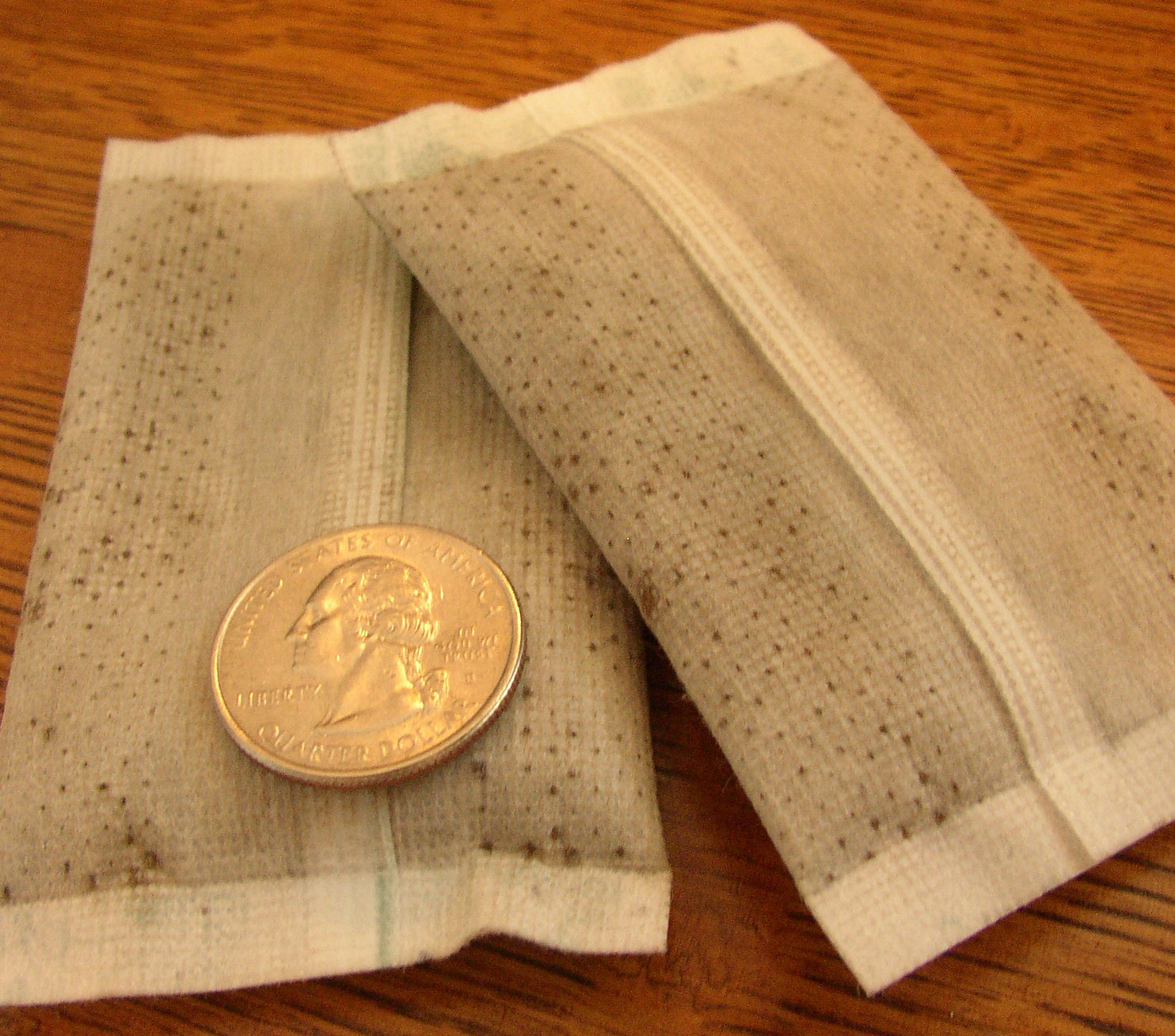
A pair of air-activated disposable hand warmers, US quarter for scale.

Air-activated hand warmers contain cellulose, iron powder, activated carbon, vermiculite (which holds water) and salt. They produce heat from the exothermic oxidation of iron when exposed to air. The oxygen molecules in the air, together with the water, react with iron, forming rust (which is a hydrated oxide of iron). Salt is usually added to catalyze the process. The commercial product is an air-permeable fabric package containing the mixture, and supplied in a sealed plastic pouch. The reaction begins as soon as the package is removed from the pouch, thereby exposed to the air, typically in a glove or pocket of a jacket. It reaches its maximum temperature in about 20 minutes, and continues to generate a modest level of heat for many hours. The instructions warn against contact with the skin of babies or young children, as the package can reach 74 °C (165 °F). When exhausted, it can be discarded with the household garbage.

=== Supersaturated solution (crystallisation-type) ===
Short clip showing the activation and crystallisation of a crystallisation-type reusable hand warmer.

This type of hand warmer can be recharged by immersing the hand-warmer in very hot water until the contents are uniform and then allowing it to cool. The release of heat is triggered by flexing a small metal disk in the hand warmer, which generates nucleation centers that initiate crystallisation. Heat is required to dissolve the salt in its own water of crystallisation and it is this heat that is released when crystallisation is initiated. The latent heat of fusion is about 264–289 kJ/kg.

This process can be scaled up to create a means of domestic heating storage and can produce instant heat.

=== Lighter fuel ===
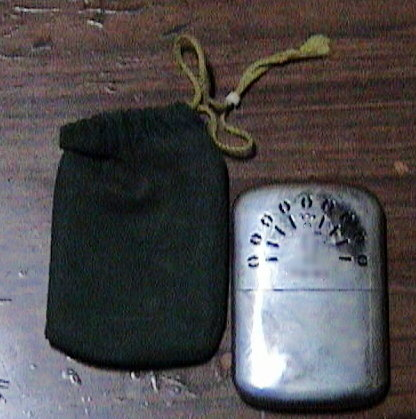
Lighter fuel warmer (Hakukin brand, Peacock model)

Lighter fuel hand-warmers use lighter fluid (highly refined petroleum naphtha), in a catalyst combustion unit that runs at a lower temperature than an open flame with a greatly reduced fire risk. After lighting they operate inside a fabric bag typically with a drawstring. This controls the oxygen supply to the catalyst and protects against skin burns. Re-use is simply done by refuelling. Modern units may use a glass fiber substrate coated with platinum or another catalyst; some older units used asbestos substrates. The replaceable catalyst units can last for many years provided they have combusted vapour from their cotton wadding filled fuel reservoir, and have not had fuel directly applied to them. These hand warmers are for people who work or pursue leisure activities outdoors in very low temperatures, especially those that require manual dexterity that is not possible while wearing thick gloves or mittens. They date from the foundation of the Japanese Hakkin company by Niichi Matoba, who founded it to produce a hand warmer 'Hakkin Kairo' based on his Japanese patent of 1923. John W. Smith, President of Aladdin Laboratories, Inc. of Minneapolis was awarded a US patent for a product called the Jon-e (pronounced “Johnny”) catalytic hand warmer on December 25, 1951. Production peaked in the fifties and sixties, at 10,000 warmers a day. Aladdin went out of business in the 1970s. In 2010 the Zippo lighter company introduced an all-metal catalytic hand warmer, along with other outdoor products.

=== Battery ===
Battery operated hand warmers use electrically resistive heating devices to convert electrical energy in the battery into heat. Typically hand warmers can heat for up to six hours, with heat outputs from 40-48C. Rechargeable electronic hand warmers can be charged from a mains power supply or from a 5V USB power supply, with many recharge cycles possible.

=== Charcoal ===
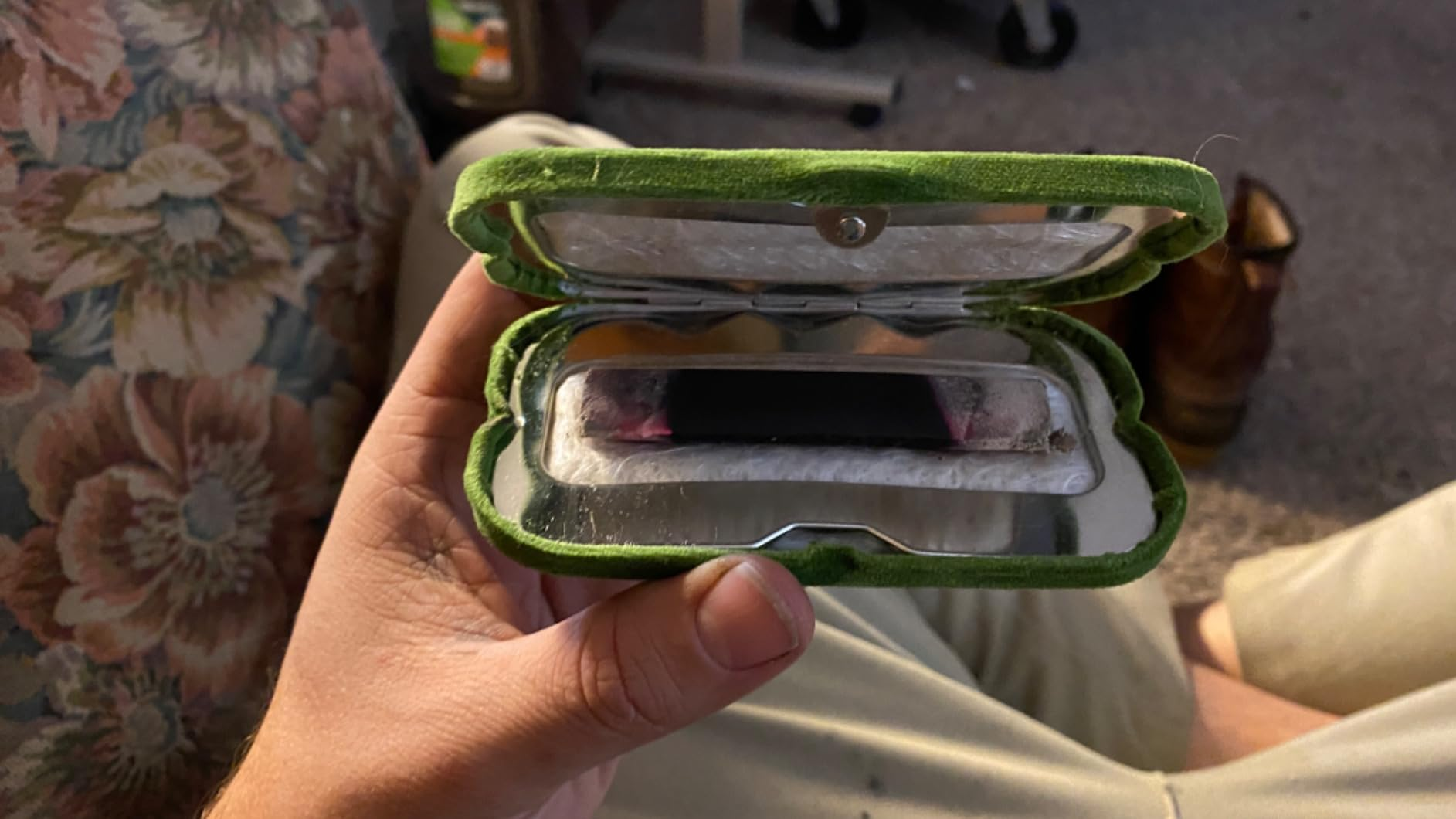
A charcoal hand-warmer with a charcoal stick smouldering inside.

Charcoal hand-warmers provide heat by a slow exothermic reaction of charcoals in a special case. Typically made of metal to act as an even heat spreader, these cases often have comfortable felt on the outside and sometimes a fire-proof insulative lining on the inside. Usage involves a carbon stick being ignited and placed inside the hand-warmer case to smolder with oxygen in the air in a heat-producing redox reaction, forming carbon oxides. The reaction can last 3 to 6 hours depending on whether both or only one ends of the charcoal is lit. Unlike iron-oxide based hand-warmers, charcoal handwarmers can last longer while staying hotter due to a more linear reaction rate but due to the charcoal fuel being shelf-stable they require an ignition source and produce a smokey odor when used. The charcoal fuel sticks are available for purchase online and from outdoor activity shops but have become less popular.

== See also ==
- Instant cold pack
- Heating pad
- Hot water bottle
- Muff (handwarmer), a fashion item
- Kanger, a Kashmiri version of a portable personal warmer
- Flameless ration heater
