= Kanger =

Earthen pot used by Kashmiris against cold

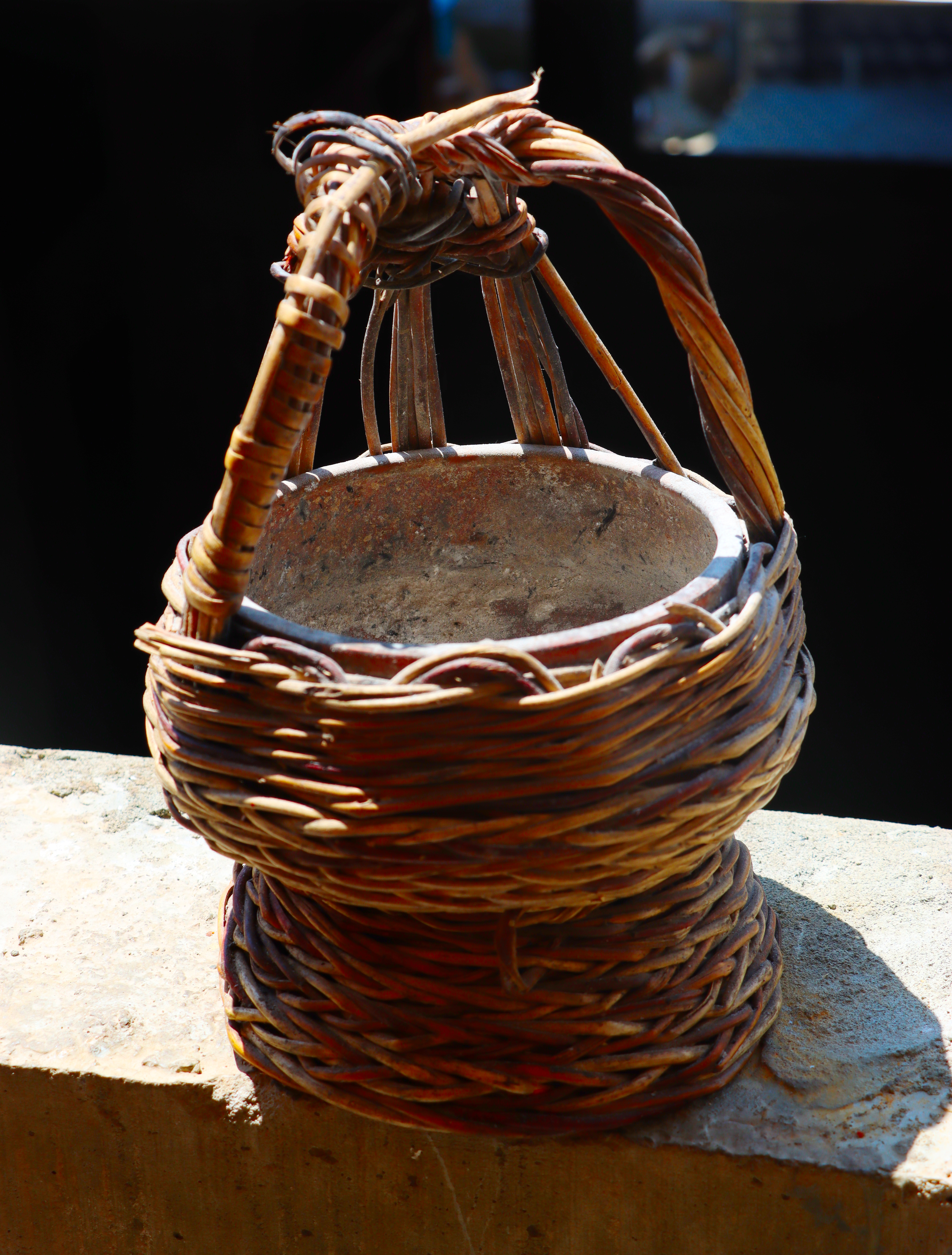
A commonly used Kashmiri Kanger

A kanger (Kashmiri pronunciation: [kãːɡɨr]; also known as kangri, kangid, or kangir) is a traditional Kashmiri portable heater consisting of an earthen pot encased in wicker, filled with hot embers. The kanger is considered not only a practical device for warmth but also a work of craft and art.

It is typically carried inside the pheran, a traditional Kashmiri cloak, or wrapped in a blanket. Its primary use is during the cold winter period known as Chillai Kalan. When used with modern clothing such as jackets, it may also function as a hand warmer.

Typical kangers measure approximately 6 inches (15 cm) in diameter and can reach temperatures of around 150 °F (66 °C). They are produced in various sizes, including smaller versions for children and larger ones for adults.

== Background ==
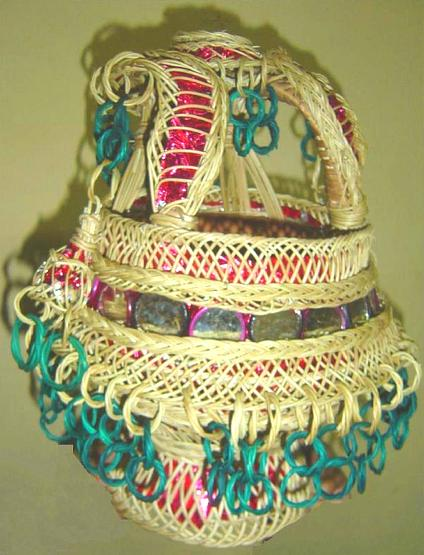
Kashmiri Ornamental Kanger

After the earthen pots are moulded and fired, the artisans complete the wickerwork around them, by erecting two arms to handle the pot, propping the back side with strong wicker sticks, and colour it (optionally) to give an aesthetically delicate shape.

== History ==
It is generally believed that Kashmiris learned the use of the kanger from the Italians who were in the retinue of the Mughal emperors and usually visited the Valley during summer. In Italy (where a similar device was known as a scaldino) and Spain, braziers were made in a great variety of shapes and were profusely ornamented. Historical data, however, contradict the claim that kanger came to Kashmir from Italy, but it is known that it was used in the time of the Mughal Empire. Those visiting Kashmir for the first time during the winter season are surprised to find people carrying fire pots in their hands or in their laps but every Kashmiri knows how to handle the apparatus with care. It is a part of Kashmiri tradition and even in modern times it sees a huge demand, and is even used in public or private offices during winters.

== Current use ==
Kanger are widely used in Kashmir. Its use is most prevalent in the countryside where power cuts during winters are frequent. Generally, everyone in the household has one. In some urban households, other devices, such as hot water bottles, blowers and electric blankets, have taken their place.

Aromatic seeds, such as isband (Peganum harmala), are often burnt in a kanger for ceremonial purposes.

Beyond Kashmir, people of the erstwhile Hill states of Himachal, Uttarakhand, and some parts of Nepal also use other local variants of kanger.

In 2015, a shopkeeper in Srinagar commissioned a kanger, described as the world's largest, to attract customers to his textile shop. Kashmir Life reported that the size, over a metre long, posed technical challenges to the wicker-weavers.

== Manufacturing ==
Kangeris are weaved by small scaled farmers known as kanile.

Charari Sharief town is the most famous for a peculiar kind of kanger called "charar kangir". Anantnag is also another major producer. The sector is not organized but is covered under different government schemes.

== Popular culture ==
This Kashmiri proverb, "what Layla was on Majnun’s bosom (legendary lovers), so is the Kanger to a Kashmiri", sums up the relationship between a Kashmiri and the Kanger and its cultural importance, which is also shown by this verse:

Ai kangri! ai kangri!
Qurban tu Hour wu Peri!
Chun dur bughul mi girimut
Durd az dil mi buree.
(Oh, kangri! oh, kangri!
You are the gift of Houris and Fairies;
When I take you under my arm
You drive fear from my heart.)

== Medical hazards ==
Regular use of the kanger can cause a specific skin cancer known as kangri cancer. This effect was first studied by W. J. Elmslie in 1866 and was thought to be caused by burns, but it is now thought to be the result of a carcinogenic distillation product of woodcoal.

== World Kangri Day ==
The tourism department of Azad Jammu and Kashmir (AJK) in Pakistan has finalised to celebrate 'Pheran and Kangri Day’ on Feb 19 to promote Kashmiri culture.

== See also ==
- Pheran
- Chillai Kalan
- Hand warmer
- Kangri cancer
- Pulhoer
