= Rantas =

Mythological creature in Kashmiri folklore

Rantas (Kashmiri pronunciation: [rãːʈas]) is a mythical creature from Kashmiri folklore. She is described as a female with long hair, pointed teeth, long nails, and inverted feet who ventures out during heavily snowy nights. She is invoked to frighten children into staying safely at home during winter.

== Behaviour ==
Rantas is said to abduct men, keeping them prisoner and later marrying them due to sorrow over the loss of her lover. She wanders and wails on moonless nights, walking on feet that are turned backward. According to legend, she lures unsuspecting travelers with her enchanting beauty, only to reveal her terrifying form once they are captivated. Rantas is believed to venture out only during heavily snowy nights, seeking young men she becomes infatuated with, whom she then kidnaps and takes to her lair.

=== Story of Lav Lone and Rantas ===
A famous story of Lav Lone and Rantas is quite popular in Kashmir urban legend which usually revolves around a man named Lav Lone who was kidnapped by the creature Rantas disguised as a beautiful woman in the Nallah Ferozpora which some people doubt in the plot-location. Some sources however argue the story originated in the forests of Anantnag while others differ the location.

In January 2021, a clip was broadcast by a local news channel which had the audio of a female screaming and was rumoured to be of a Rantas.

== See also ==
- Chillai Kalan
- Bramrachokh
