= Chillai Kalan =

40 days of intense cold in Kashmir

Chillai Kalan or Chilla-i-Kalan (Note: Kashmiri pronunciation: [t͡ʃilaj kalaːn]) (Persian: چلّه کلان, lit. 'Forty grand [days]') refers to a forty-day period of intense cold and harsh winter weather experienced annually from 21 December to 29 January, in the Kashmir Valley. It represents the coldest phase of winter in the region and has long held climatic, cultural, and social significance

Chillai Kalan is followed by two shorter cold periods; Chill-i-Khurd (Note: Kashmiri pronunciation: [t͡ʃilaj xɔrɨd]) (lit. 'forty small [days]'), a twenty-day phase from 30 January to 18 February, and Chill-i-Bachha (Note: Kashmiri pronunciation: [t͡ʃilɨ bat͡ʃi]) (lit. 'forty baby [days]') which is from February 19 to February 28.

== Etymology and origins ==
The term Chilla-i Kalan derives from Persian, where چِهل (chil) means "forty" and کلان (kalan) means "major" or "greater", reflecting both the duration and severity of the cold spell. This naming stems from the period's historical associations and linguistic influence of Persian culture in Kashmir during the medieval and early modern eras.

== Weather patterns ==
Chillai Kalan corresponds climatically with the winter solstice and deep winter conditions in the western Himalayas, when temperatures reach their annual lows and cold continental air masses dominate the region. During this period, temperatures often remain below freezing, particularly at night. Water bodies such as lakes and rivers may freeze, including portions of the iconic Dal Lake in Srinagar.

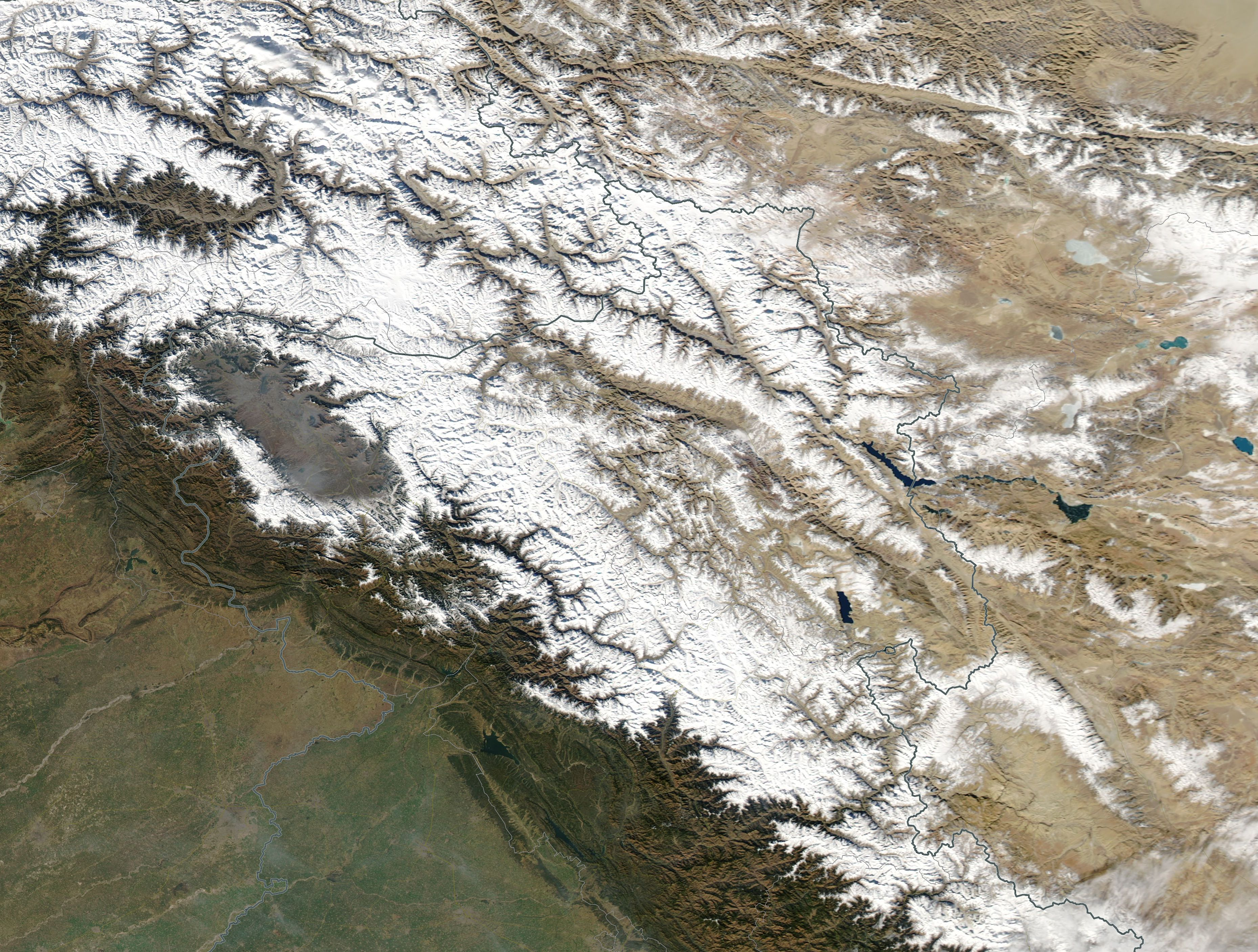
MODIS image showing widespread snow cover across Jammu and Kashmir, and Ladakh.

Snowfall is frequent and heavy, especially in higher elevations. Snow that falls during Chillai Kalan typically accumulates and persists for extended periods, contributing to glacier mass and replenishing downstream water reservoirs, streams and rivers used for irrigation and municipal water in warmer months.

=== Reduced snowfall in recent years ===
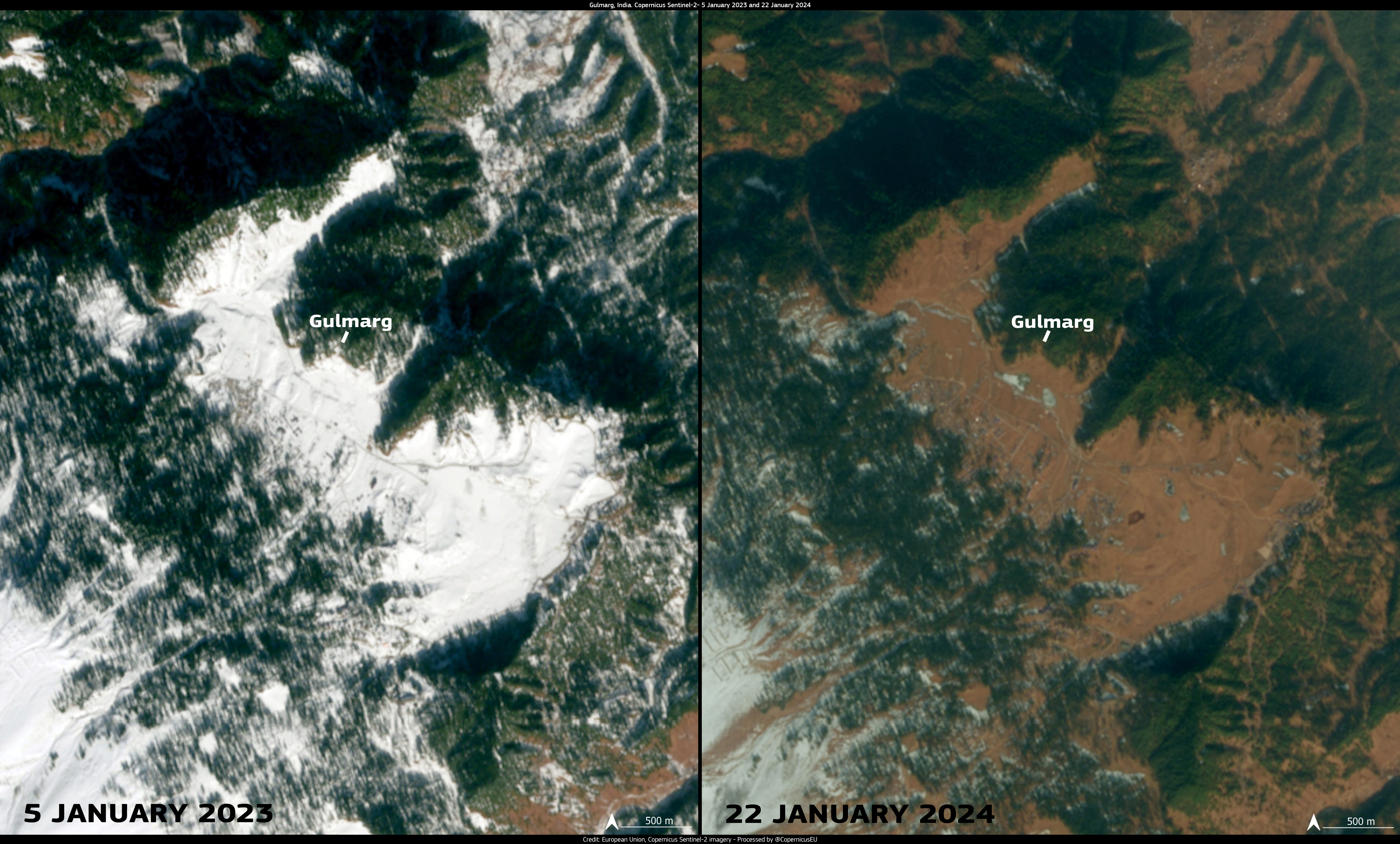
Satellite Imagery showing lack of snow in Gulmarg in 2024 compared to 2023

In the recent years, Chillai Kalan has sometimes seen unusually low levels of snowfall and precipitation, particularly in the early and mid-winter months. Reports by local meteorological sources have recorded periods where the first weeks of Chillai Kalan passed with little to no wet weather, extending dry spells that are uncommon for this period traditionally associated with frequent snow and rain. In some seasons, snowfall in the plains was minimal or absent for several weeks, prompting concerns among residents, farmers, and tourism stakeholders about water resources and winter economic activity.

These anomalies have been linked in part to shifting weather patterns and warming trends, as observed by climate researchers noting higher snowlines and shifts from snow to rain during winter in parts of the region.

== Impact on daily life ==
The prolonged and severe cold of Chillai Kalan has significant effects on daily life and infrastructure in the Valley. Essential services such as water supply lines frequently freeze, disrupting supply in residential areas. Use of heating devices rises sharply, increasing energy consumptions and occasionally resulting in electricity shortages or blackout. Traditional heating methods often remain in use alongside modern devices.

=== Transportation ===
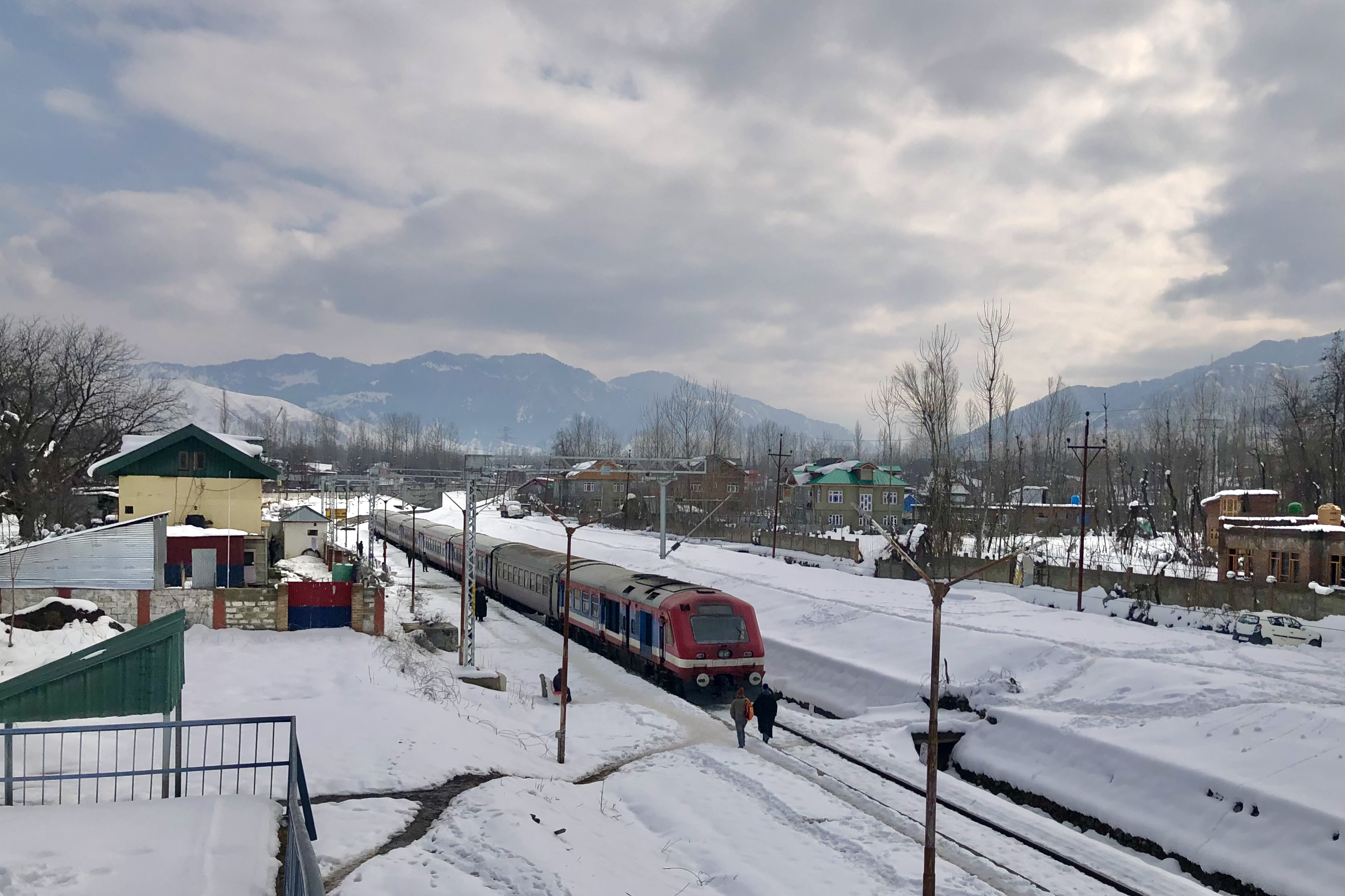
An Indian railways train in snow at the Hiller Shahabad railway station in the territory of Jammu and Kashmir.

During Chillai Kalan transportation can be hampered by snowfall and icy conditions, and reduced visibility, especially on higher mountain passes. The Srinagar–Jammu National Highway (NH 44), the road linking the valley with the rest of India, is often closed temporarily due to snow accumulation, landslides, shooting stones, and icy conditions, stranding vehicles and necessitating clearance operations before traffic can resume.

Heavy snowfall, rain and low visibility frequently disrupt air transportation in and out of Kashmir Valley. Adverse winter weather has led to cancellation and delays of multiple flights at Srinagar International Airport, as poor visibility and snow accumulation affect runway operations and flight schedules.

=== Health ===
Health issues associated with cold, such as respiratory ailments, may rise among vulnerable populations. The extreme cold increases the incidence of cold-induced skin conditions such as chilblains (locally known as shuh), which are inflamed, itchy, swollen lumps typically affecting extremities like toes. Medical observations in Kashmir have found chilblains prevalent among children and individuals with lower body mass or genetic susceptibility.

== Cultural practices and traditions ==
Chilla-i Kalan is deeply embedded in Kashmiri culture and traditional practices, influencing clothing, food, and social customs:

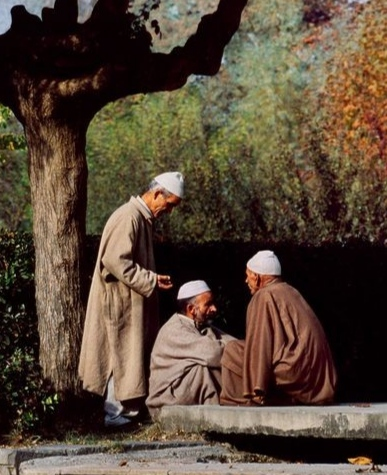
A group of Kashmiri men wearing Pheran

The Pheran, a long woollen cloak native to Kashmir Valley, is widely worn during this period for warmth. 21 December is observed annually as Pheran Day to celebrate and preserve this winter tradition.

The Kanger, an earthen pot filled with embers carried under the pheran, is a traditional portable heating device used during the coldest days.

Harisse (a slow-cooked meat dish) and high-calorie foods are consumed for warmth and energy.

== Economic dimensions ==
While Chillai Kalan presents challenges, it also influences local economic activities and social rhythms. Traditional crafts and apparel productions, such as woollens, see seasonal demand.

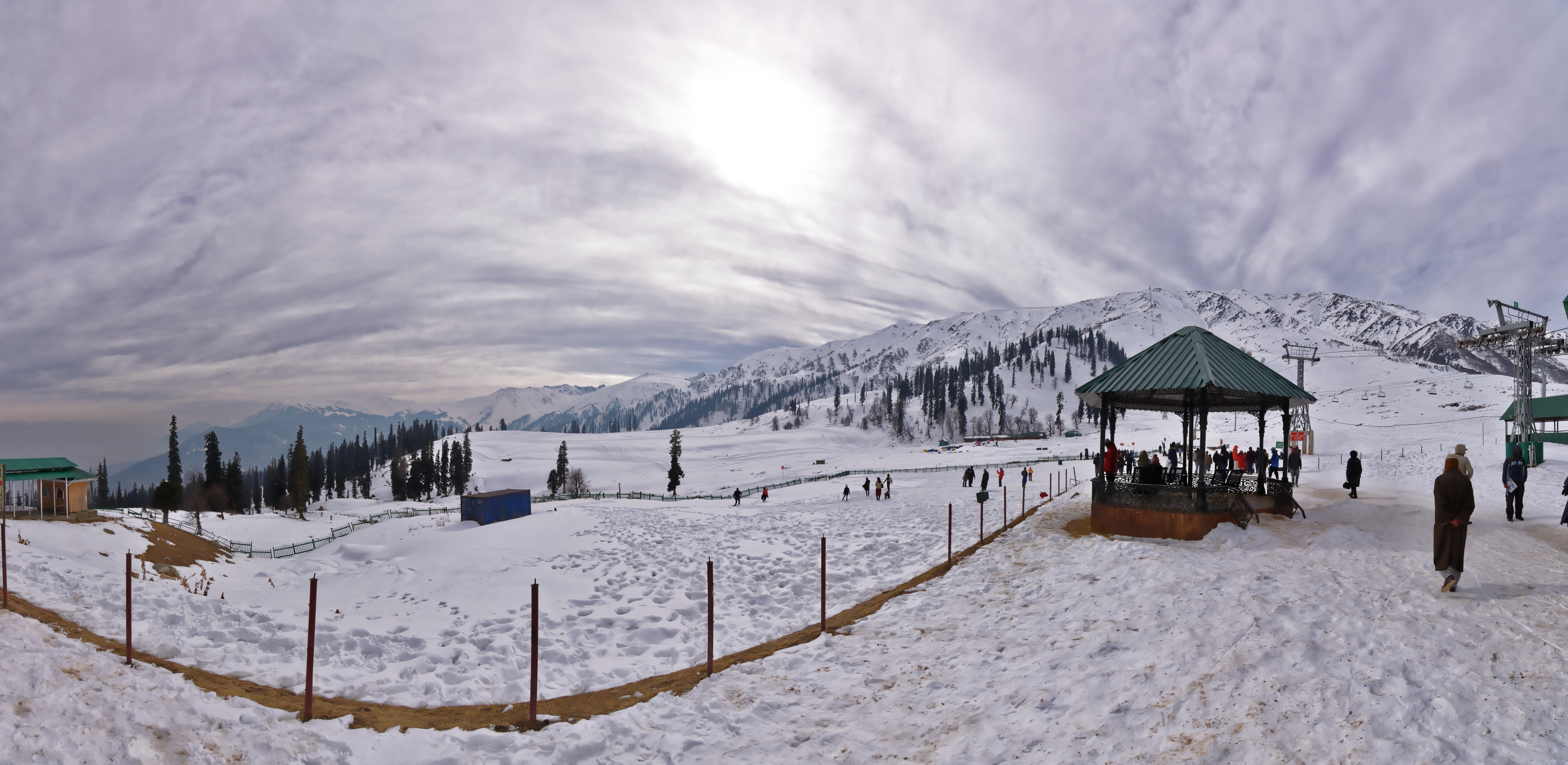
Kandoori station in Gulmarg

Winter tourism, particularly in snowy areas such as Gulmarg, Sonamarg, and Pahalgam, attracts visitors interested in winter sports and scenic landscapes.

== See also ==
- Rantas
- Yalda Night
