= Overa-Aru Wildlife Sanctuary =

National park in Pahalgam.India

- IUCN category IV (habitat/species management area)
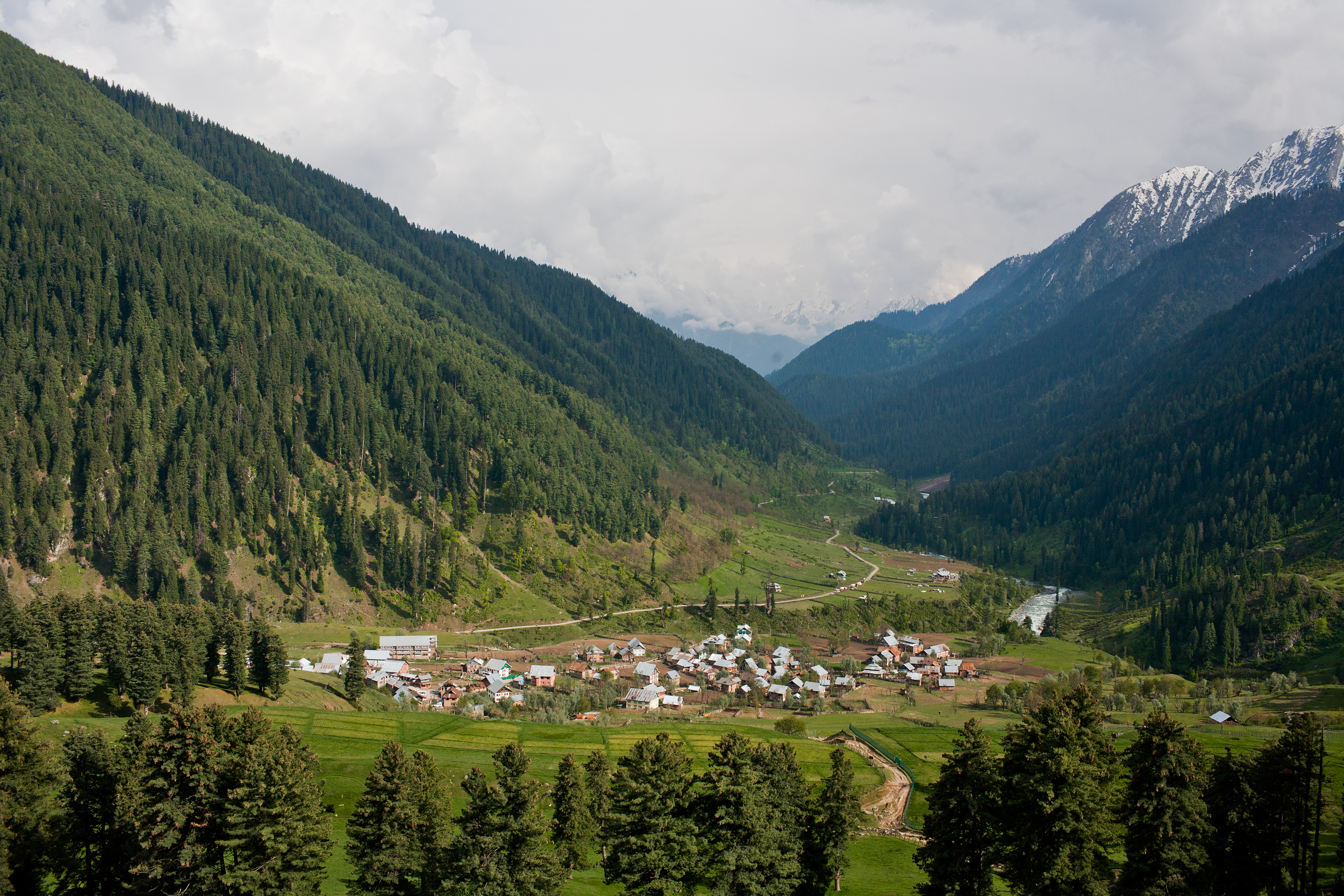
- Aru Valley within the Sanctuary in Anantnag district, Jammu and Kashmir, India

- Location within Jammu and Kashmir Location within India
- Interactive map of Overa-Aru Wildlife Sanctuary
- Location: Aru Valley, Pahalgam, Anantnag district, Jammu and Kashmir, India
- Nearest city: Anantnag city
- Coordinates: 34°06′36″N 75°14′51″E
- Area: 511 km^{2} (197 sq mi)
- Max. elevation: 5,425 metres (17,799 ft)
- Min. elevation: 2,100 metres (6,900 ft)
- Established: 1981
- Governing body: Department of Wildlife Protection

The Overa-Aru Wildlife Sanctuary is a protected area in Aru Valley, Pahalgam near Anantnag city in Anantnag district of Jammu and Kashmir, India. It lies 46 km from Anantnag city, the district headquarter. It is on the periphery of the two villages of Overa and Aru. The sanctuary spreads over 511 square kilometres (197 mi^{2}), lies 76 kilometres (47 mi) east of Srinagar. It was declared a game reserve in 1945 under the Dogra Rule and later upgraded to a sanctuary in 1981.

== Geography ==
The Overa-Aru Wildlife Sanctuary lies in the Lidder Forest Division in Anantnag District of the Kashmir province. It is bordered to the north by Sind Valley and to the west by Dachigam National Park. The sanctuary constitutes 38 Forest compartments. The Overa-Aru Wildlife Sanctuary is a catchment area of the Lidder River, a tributary of Jhelum and forms an important source of irrigation and drinking water. Geographical features of the sanctuary include lakes, glaciers and mountain peaks. The most notable are the Tarsar Lake and the Kolahoi with a peak elevation of 5,425 metres (17,799 ft) above sea level. It is also the highest point of the sanctuary. The Overa-Aru Wildlife Sanctuary has a temperate climate, it is out of the reach of the monsoon. The precipitation in the form of snowfall is heavy in winter.

== Flora and fauna ==
The vegetation of the sanctuary varies according to the altitude. The deciduous forest occurs below 2600 meters of altitude which grows Aesculus indica, Juglans regia, Fraxinus spp, Padus cornuta, Rus succedanea, and Pyrus lanata. The coniferous forest lies between 2,600 and 3,000 metres. It grows mostly blue pine on dry soil and silver fir (Abies pindrow) on moist soil. Birch forest ranges from 3000 to 3500 meters, the most common species are white birch (Betula utilis). Juniperus spp grow from 3500 to 3800 meters in the alpine scrub.

The Overa-Aru Wildlife Sanctuary has a recorded 117 bird species of which 89 species – including eight species of sympatric warblers – breed within the sanctuary. The globally threatened bird species found in the sanctuary are endangered Egyptian vulture (Neophron percnopterus), vulnerable Kashmir flycatcher (Ficedula subrubra), and near-threatened European roller (Coracias garrulus) and Tytler's leaf warbler (Phylloscopus tytleri). Among the 18 species of butterflies recorded in the sanctuary, four are listed in the IUCN Red List.

The Overa-Aru Wildlife Sanctuary lies within the distributional range of the critically endangered Kashmir stag (Cervus hanglu). There are 18 species of other mammals found in the sanctuary which include Kashmir musk deer (Moschus cupreus), Asiatic ibex (Capra sibrica), Himalayan Serow (Capricornis thar), common leopard (Panthera pardus), Asiatic black bear (Ursus thibetanus), Himalayan brown bear (Ursus arctos), golden marmot (Marmota sp) and vulpes (fox).

== See also ==
- Gulmarg Wildlife Sanctuary
- Hirpora Wildlife Sanctuary
