= Tarsar Lake =

Lake in Jammu and Kashmir, India

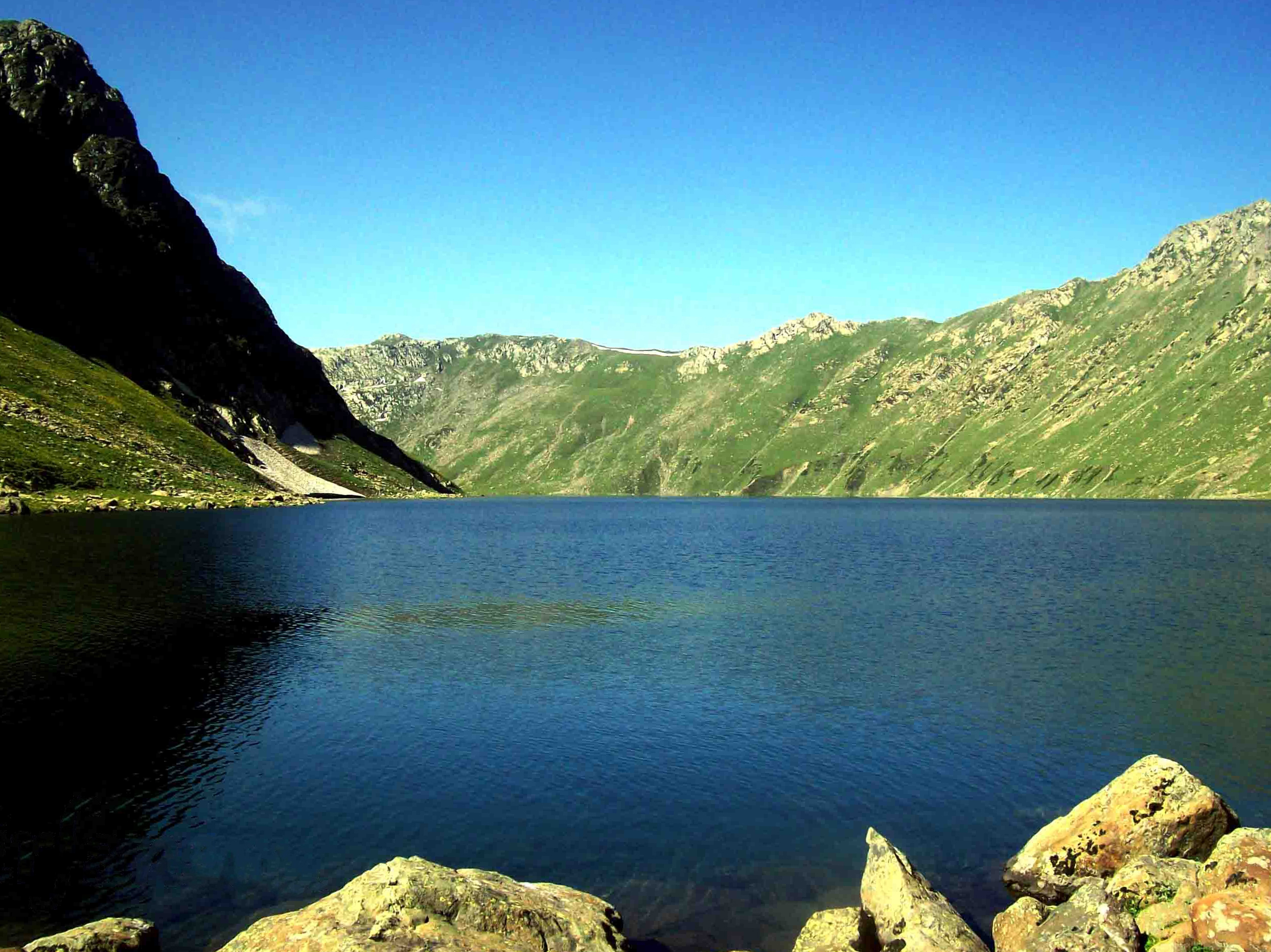

- Location within Jammu and Kashmir Location within India
- Location: pulwama district, Jammu and Kashmir
- Coordinates: 34°8′26″N 75°8′54″E
- Type: oligotrophic lake
- Primary inflows: snowmelt
- Primary outflows: Basmai Nalla (a tributary of Lidder River)
- Basin countries: India
- Max. length: 2 kilometres (1.2 mi)
- Max. width: 0.8 kilometres (0.50 mi)
- Surface area: 2 km^{2} (0.77 sq mi)
- Surface elevation: 3,795 metres (12,451 ft)
- Frozen: December to March

The Tarsar Lake or Tar Sar is an almond-shaped, oligotrophic alpine lake situated in the Anantnag district of Jammu and Kashmir in India. On its west side lies Dachigam National Park, and on its south side lies Tral. The shortest route for reaching it, is from Surfraw Ganderbal, but it has a difficult terrain. Other trek routes to the lake are from Lidderwat and Nagaberan forest areas which fall in south Kashmir.

== Geography ==
The Tarsar Lake is dominated by the peaks of the Kolahoi mountain some 20 km to the east. The lake is separated by a mountain with a minimum peak elevation of 4,000 metres (13,000 ft) from another lake of the same nature known as Marsar Lake, which is in the vicinity of Dachigam National Park. Together these two lakes are referred to as the twin sisters. The 16th-century Kashmiri ruler Yusuf Shah Chak mentioned the twin lakes in his poetry, writing to his beloved:

When I remember the two tresses of the comely beloved, Tears begin to flow from my eyes like streams from Tarsar and Marsar.

The Tarsar Lake is drained by an outlet stream which falls into the Lidder River at Lidderwat, 15 km to the east. Being the nearest seasonal settlement, Lidderwat is located on the trek route to the lake from Aru, Pahalgam. The Marsar Lake on the other hand drains out and flows in the opposite direction of the Tarsar Lake.

== Flora and fauna ==
During the winter, the Tarsar Lake freezes and is covered by heavy snow; it has floating ice even in the summer. The basin of the lake is surrounded by a sheet of alpine flowers. The geum, blue poppy, potentilla and gentian are relatively common. Hedysarum flowers are found in late spring throughout the area around the lake.

During summer there are breeding colonies of migratory birds, including bar-headed geese, lammergeyers, high-flying choughs, Himalayan golden eagles, cinnamon sparrows and black bulbuls. The basin of Tarsar and the adjoining Dachigam National Park constitute one of the most important habitats of the Kashmir stag (hangul), ibex, musk deer, snow leopard, Himalayan brown bear and in the higher reaches, the golden marmot.

== Access ==
The Tarsar Lake is accessible only during the summer preferably from June to Mid September; during the winter, the treks are closed because of the heavy snowfall. It can be reached from Srinagar, via a 102 km motorable road which leads through Anantnag and Pahalgam to the Aru trekking camp. The alpine meadow of Lidderwat lies at the halfway point of the two-day trek to the lake and happens to be mostly the basecamp for most of the trekkers. One could visit the lake and come back to his basecamp at Lidderwat in the same day.

An alternate route leads through Ganderbal and a trekking starting point at Surfraw in the Sind Valley. Due to the steepness of the trek, it is preferable to approach the lake by the Aru-Lidderwat trek and return via the Surfraw Sind Valley trek. On this route, walkers may see the Uppar portion and Nallah of Surfraw (Soraf Raw) village. Another accessible route to Tarsar and Marsar is a place called Naga-Baren via Tral.
