= Betaab (disambiguation) =

Betaab may refer to:

- Betaab, a 1983 Indian Hindi-language romance film
- Betaab Valley, a valley in Jammu and Kashmir, India

== See also ==
- Betaabi, 1997 Indian film by Rajesh Kumar Singh
