= Bongund =

Bona gund (also called Bongund) is a village in Anantnag tehsil in Anantnag district in the Indian union territory of Jammu and Kashmir. It is one of 105 villages in Anantnag Block along with villages like Hutmarah and Bona Nambal.
