= Betaab Valley =

Valley in Jammu and Kashmir, India

- Hajan Valley
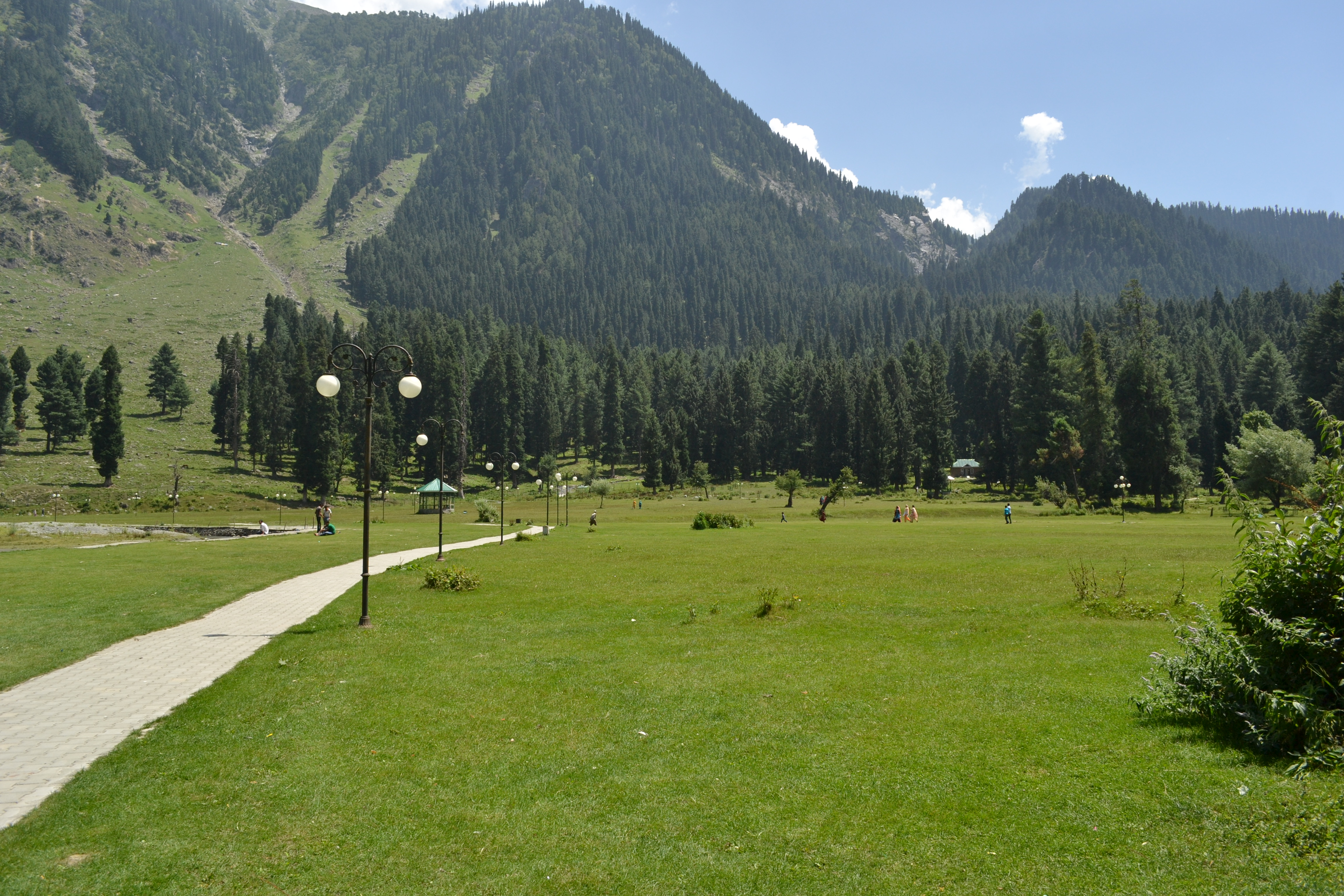
- Betaab Valley
- Floor elevation: 7,851 ft (2,393 m)
- Length: 7 mi (11 km)
- Width: 2 mi (3.2 km)

Geography
- Country: India
- State/Province: Jammu & Kashmir
- District: Anantnag
- Borders on: Sind Valley; Lidder Valley
- Coordinates: 34°3′1.476″N 75°21′49.716″E
- Mountain range: Himalaya
- River: Lidder River
- Interactive map of Betaab Valley

Betaab Valley, also known as Hajan Valley, Hagan Valley or Hagoon, is situated at a distance of 15 km (9.3 mi) from Pahalgam in the Anantnag district in India's union territory of Jammu and Kashmir. The Valley is towards northeast of Pahalgam and falls between Pahalgam and Chandanwadi and is en route Amarnath Temple Yatra. The valley surrounded by lush green meadows, snow clad mountains and covered with dense vegetation.

== Etymology ==
The valley was named after the 1983 film Betaab. Natively known as Hagan Valley or Hagoon, the location became a popular tourist destination after the film Betaab, starring Sunny Deol and Amrita Singh, was shot there.

== History ==
Betaab Valley, which is a part of Pahalgam area – one of the several sub-valleys of Kashmir Valley came into existence during the post geosynclinal stage of the development of the Himalayas. The valley lies between the two Himalayan Ranges – Pir Panjal and Zanskar.

== Tourism ==
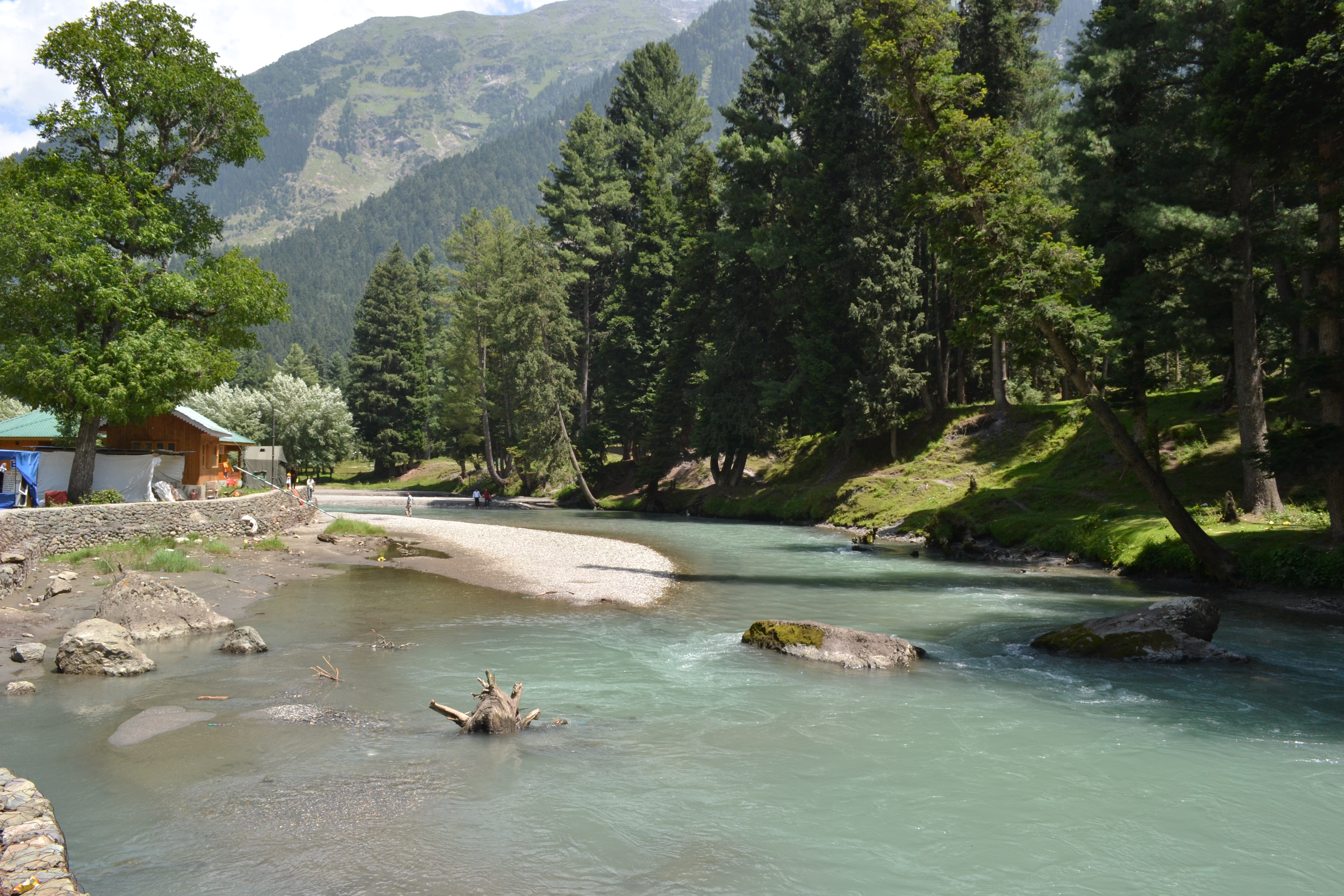
Lidder river, Betaab Valley

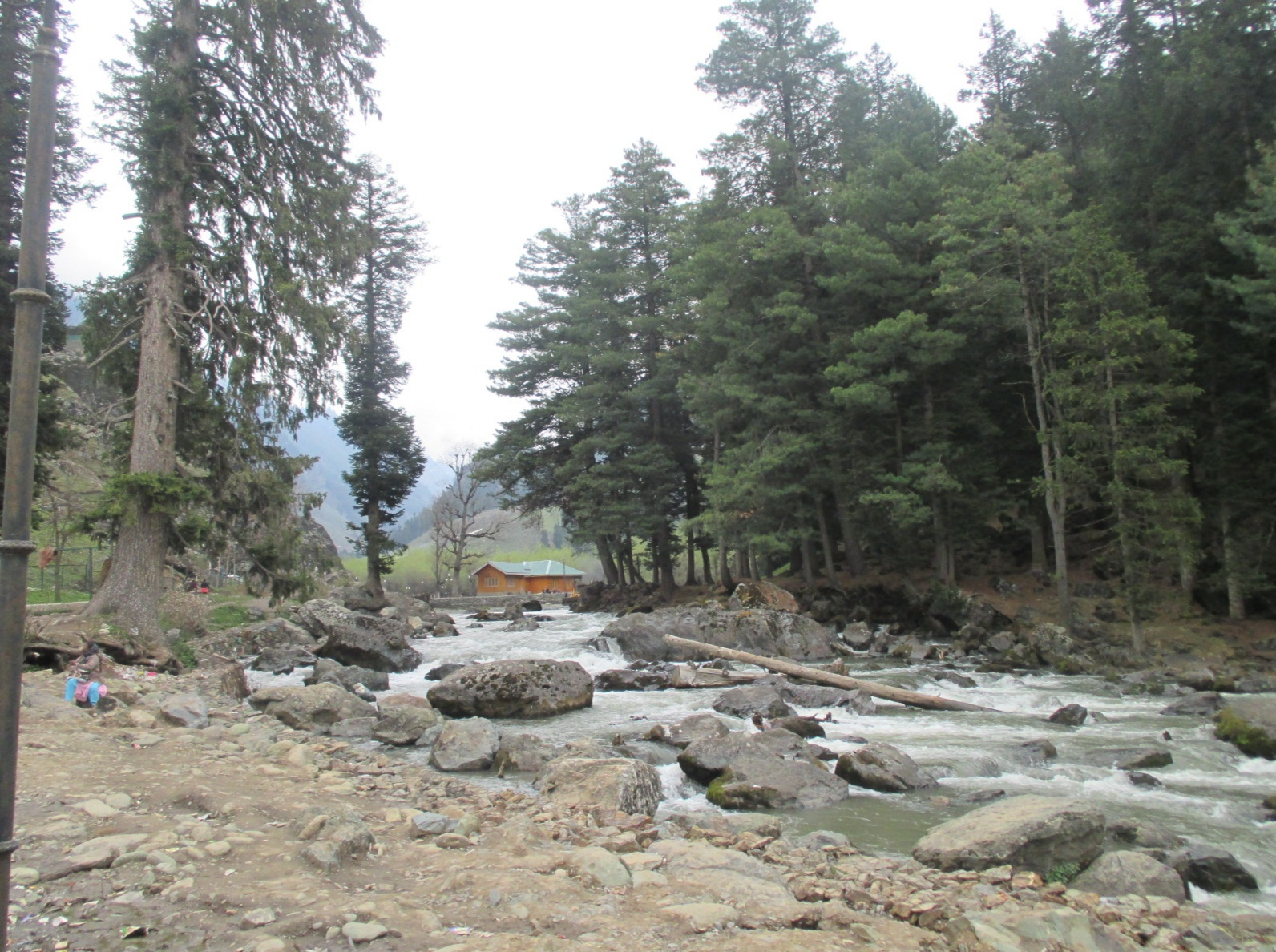
A natural view, April 2013.

Betaab valley is a very popular tourist destination in Jammu and Kashmir. It is also a favourite campsite of travellers as it also serves as a base camp for trekking and further exploration of the mountains. The valley is a walk-able distance from Pahalgam. The crystal clear and chilly water of the stream bubbling down from the snowy hills is a delight; locals here drink this water too. Baisaran and Tulian Lake are few nearby attractions that can be visited.

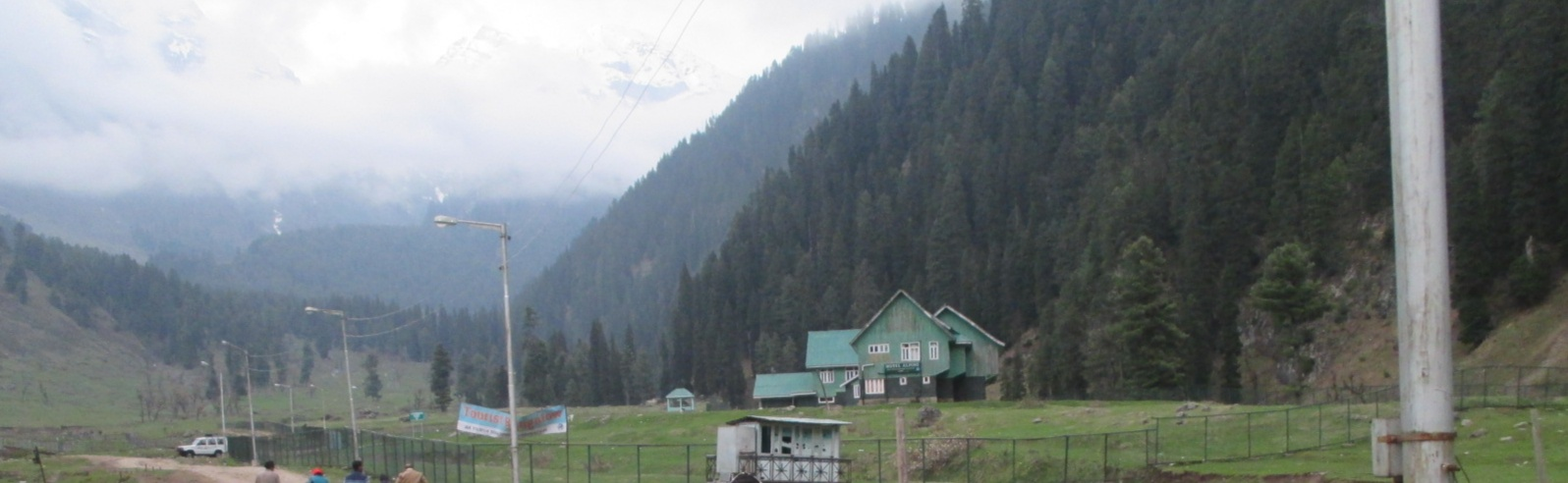
Betaab Valley, panoramic view.

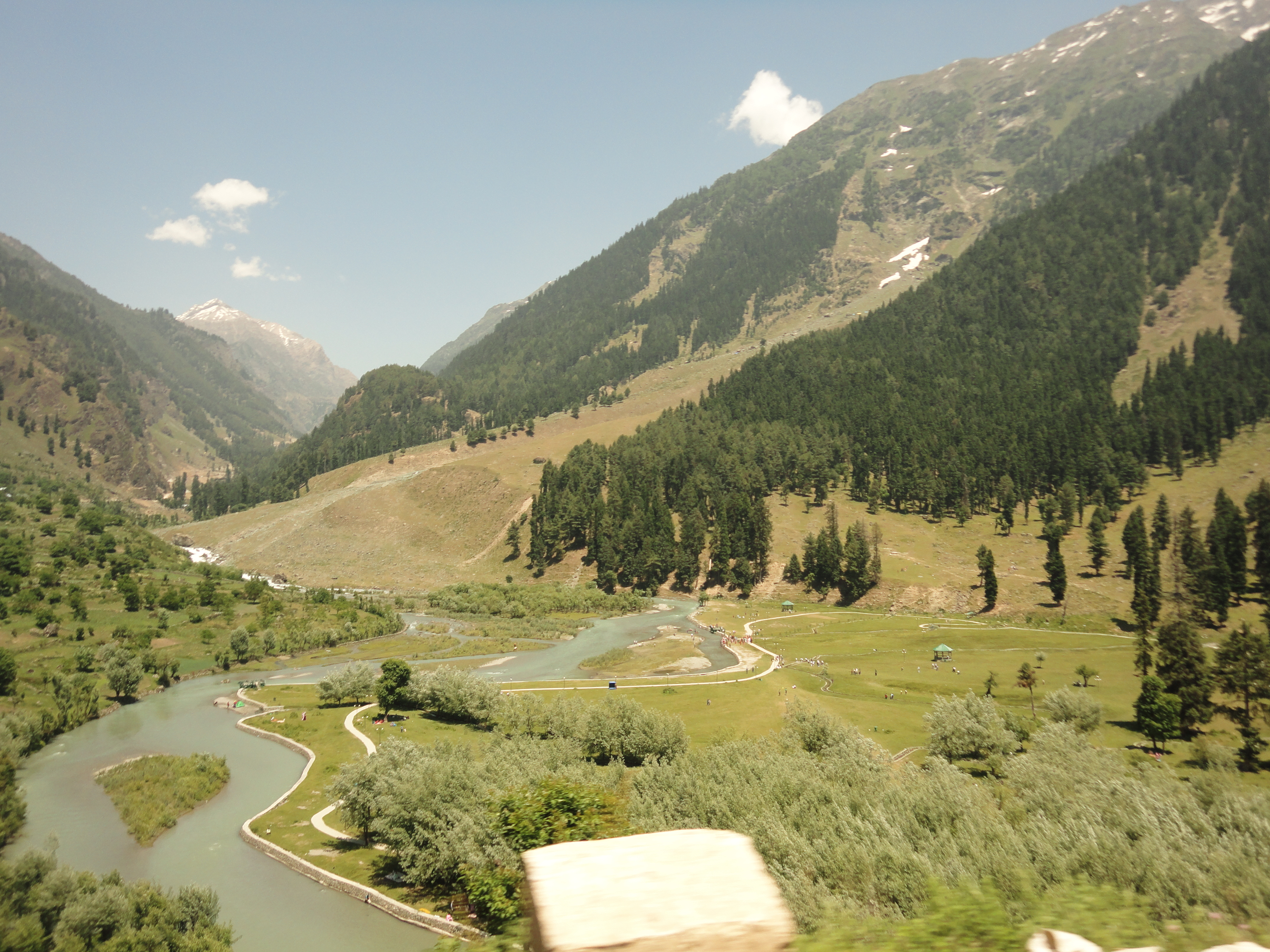
Betaab Valley-aerial view
