= Manickam =

Manickam is an Indian surname. Notable people called Manickam include:

- KR. RM. Kariya Manickam Ambalam, Indian politician, social worker, and former Member of the Legislative Assembly
- C. Manickam, Indian politician and former Member of the Legislative Assembly of Tamil Nadu
- Kambar Manickam, Priest of the Tamil Evangelical Lutheran Church
- M. Manickam, Ceylon Tamil politician and member of the Senate of Ceylon
- M. S. Manickam (born 1946), Indian politician, businessman, farmer, and former member of the Legislative Assembly of Tamil Nadu
- Manickam Yogeswaran, Sri Lankan Tamil Carnatic musician

== See also ==
- Manaivi Oru Manickam (transl. Wife is a gem), 1990 Indian Tamil-language thriller film
- Manaiviye Manithanin Manickam (transl. Wife is the ruby of a man), 1959 Indian Tamil-language film
- Manitharil Manickam (transl. A Jewel Among Humans), 1973 Indian Tamil-language film
- Mathar Kula Manickam (transl. A gem among women), 1956 Indian Tamil-language drama film
- Manigam
- Manikkam
