= Marsar Lake =

Lake in Jammu and Kashmir, India

- Location within Jammu and Kashmir Location within India
- Location: Srinagar district, Jammu and Kashmir
- Coordinates: 34°8′38″N 75°6′36″E
- Type: Alpine Lake
- Primary inflows: snowmelt
- Primary outflows: Daghwan Nalla
- Frozen: December to March

The Marsar Lake is an oligotrophic alpine lake located in Srinagar district in Jammu and Kashmir, India in the disputed Kashmir region. It is located within Dachigam National Park, and is close to the Aru valley.

The lake is separated by a mountain with a minimum peak elevation of 4,000 metres (13,000 ft) from another lake of the same nature known as Tarsar Lake. Due to their close proximity and similar physical characteristics, the two lakes are often called as the "twin sisters". The site has over the years become a famous tourist destination. Tarsar-Marsar Trek is one of the highly opted treks of the Kashmir Valley. A stream (Dagwan Nallah) emerges from this lake, which travels through the Dachigam valley and enters Srinagar near Harwan garden where it fills the Sarband reservoir. This stream is joined by another stream which flows from Mount Mahadeo near the Telbal village and from thereon it is called the Telbal Nallah which is the primary source of the Dal Lake.

== See also ==
- Tarsar Lake
