= Betaab =

- Theatrical release poster
- Directed by: Rahul Rawail
- Written by: Javed Akhtar
- Produced by: Bikram Singh Dehal
- Starring: Sunny Deol; Amrita Singh; Shammi Kapoor; Nirupa Roy; Prem Chopra; Annu Kapoor
- Cinematography: Manmohan Singh
- Edited by: V. N. Mayekar
- Music by: R. D. Burman
- Production company: Vijayta Films
- Distributed by: Eros International
- Release date: 5 August 1983
- Running time: 163 minutes
- Country: India
- Language: Hindi
- Box office: est. ₹13.5 crore

Betaab (transl. Eager) is a 1983 Indian Hindi-language romance film written by Javed Akhtar, directed by Rahul Rawail and produced by Bikram Singh Dehal. The film stars Sunny Deol and Amrita Singh in their debut roles, along with Shammi Kapoor and Prem Chopra.

The plot of the film was loosely based on William Shakespeare’s The Taming Of The Shrew. The music was composed by Rahul Dev Burman.

The inauguration of Betaab occurred in 1981 in the presence of Dilip Kumar, Raj Kapoor, Dharmendra and Saira Banu. Before the release of Betaab, Sunny Deol also had an uncredited small role in the 1982 film Main Intaquam Loonga, in which his father Dharmendra was the hero. Betaab was a major commercial success and went on to be one of the biggest hits of the year, emerging as the 2nd highest grossing Indian film of 1983. The film was remade in Telugu as Samrat in 1987 with Ramesh Babu and in Kannada as Karthik in 2011 with Karthik Shetty.

== Plot ==
This film is a love story of two youngsters who fall in love despite the status gaps between their families. Sunny Kapoor, is a young, poor and happy guy who lives with his mother, Sumitra, and his dog, Boozo, in his home-made town farm located alongside a stream in a picturesque mountain valley. Formerly, his father Avinash Kapoor had been a wealthy businessman, but he went bankrupt. For this reason, he killed himself. Avinash was close friends with Sardar Dinesh Singh Girji who is one of the richest and most powerful men in the city. When Sardar reveals that Avinash has gone bankrupt, he turns his back to him. Sardar has one daughter called Roma. She is spoiled, snobbish and accustomed to having all the people who surround her beneath her. She was Sunny's childhood friend.

Now, Sardar purchases a new horse farm out of the city in the town, which is nearby Sunny's farm. When Sunny accompanies his mother to the train station, he encounters Roma after not seeing her for years. Sunny instantly recognizes her, but Roma doesn't. Consequently, they coincidentally meet each other various times on the farm. They quarrel continually, but soon she realises that he is her childhood friend and they reconstruct their childhood love.

== Cast ==
- Sunny Deol as Sunny Kapoor
  - Sonu Nigam as young Sunny
- Amrita Singh as Roma Singh / Dingy
- Shammi Kapoor as Sardar Dinesh Singh Girji
- Nirupa Roy as Sumitra Kapoor
- Prem Chopra aa Balwant
- Rajeev Anand as Yashwant
- Annu Kapoor as Chelaram
- Rehana as Roma’s friend
- Goga Kapoor as Ganga
- Birbal as Gangaram

== Music and soundtrack ==
The movie has five popular songs whose lyrics are penned by Anand Bakshi and sung by Lata Mangeshkar and Shabbir Kumar. The music is composed by R. D. Burman.

No.	Title	Singer(s)	Length
1.	"Jab Hum Jawan Honge"	Lata Mangeshkar, Shabbir Kumar	7:10
2.	"Teri Tasveer Mil Gayee"	Shabbir Kumar	4:43
3.	"Tumne Dee Awaaz"	Shabbir Kumar	5:01
4.	"Apne Dil Se Badi Dushmani Ki"	Lata Mangeshkar, Shabbir Kumar	5:28
5.	"Badal Yun Garajta Hai"	Lata Mangeshkar, Shabbir Kumar	5:39

== Awards ==
31st Filmfare Awards:

Nominated

- Best Film – Bikram Singh Dehal
- Best Director – Rahul Rawail
- Best Actor – Sunny Deol
- Best Story – Javed Akhtar
- Best Music Director – R. D. Burman
- Best Lyricist – Anand Bakshi for "Jab Hum Jawaan Honge"
- Best Male Playback Singer – Shabbir Kumar for "Jab Hum Jawaan Honge"
- Best Male Playback Singer – Shabbir Kumar for "Parvaton Se Aaj"

== Betaab Valley ==
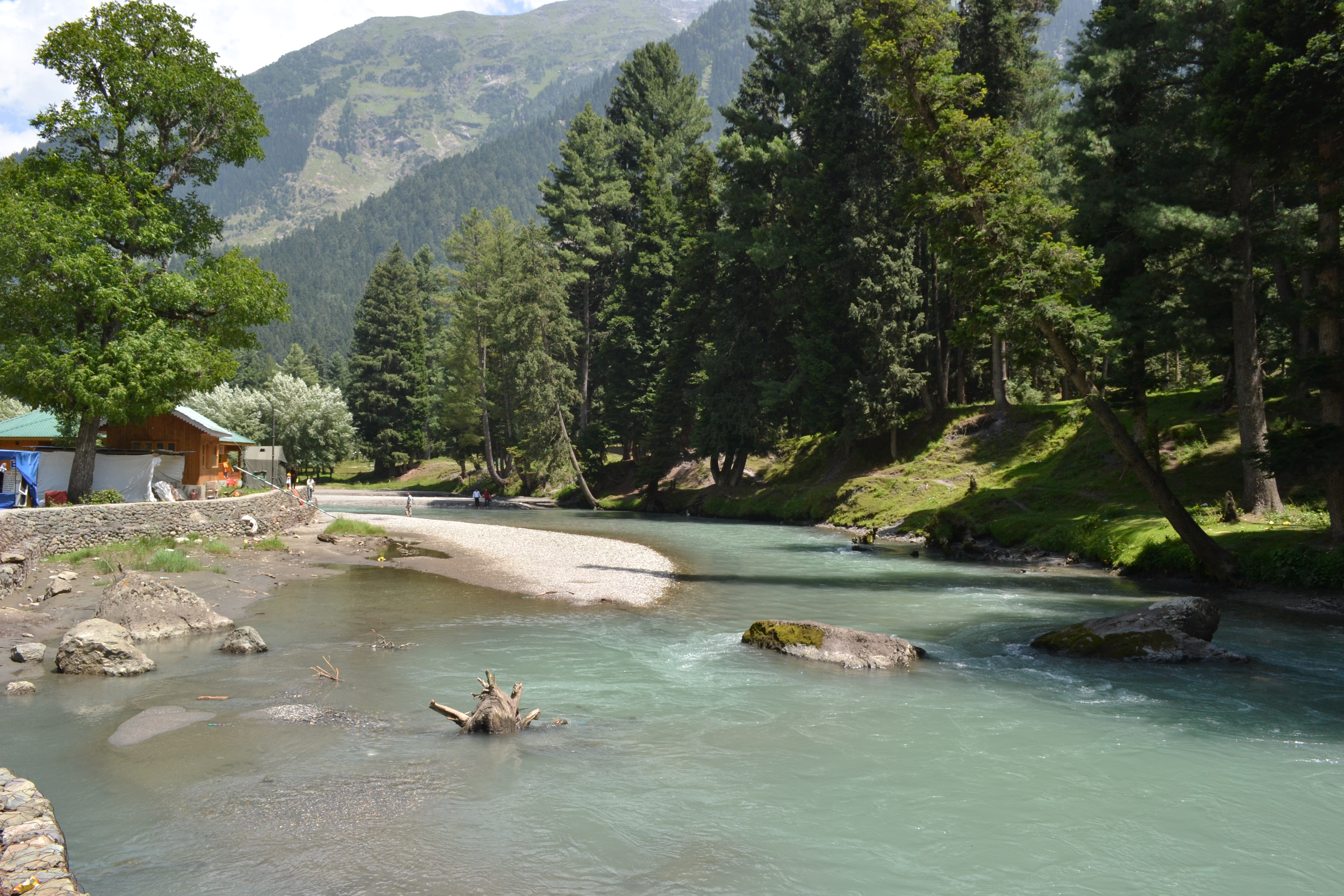
Lidder river, Betaab Valley

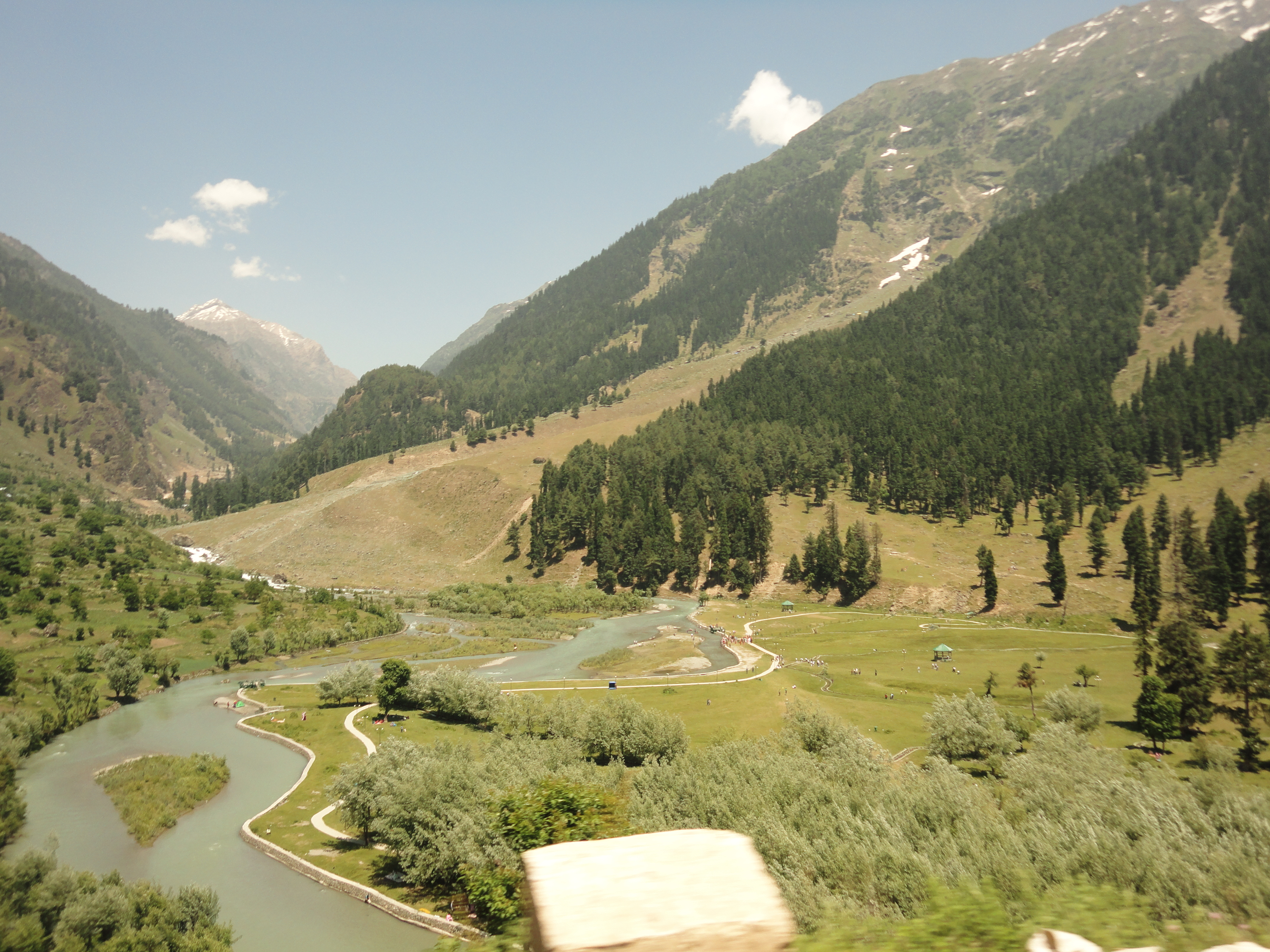
Betaab Valley, Kashmir

The famous tourist destination Betaab Valley in the Kashmir was named after the film Betaab. The location, virtually unknown earlier, became a famous tourist destination after the movie Betaab was filmed there.
