= Hutmarah =

Village in tehsil Anantnag

Hutmarah is a village situated on beautiful K P Road in Anantnag East tehsil in Anantnag district in the Indian union territory of Jammu and Kashmir. It is one of 105 villages in Anantnag East Tehsil Block Mattan along with villages like Seer hamdan and Mattan. It is divided into 9 main parts which are big mohalla of Hargam, Malpora, Nayakpora, Dangerpora, Dashmesh Colony-Sikh Mohalla, Peer Mohalla, Nai basti, cooperative colony and Noor colony. The township is situated on the banks of Lidder River. Muslims, Hindus and Sikhs live together in this village. Moreover, the entire village lives in peace and harmony and there is no conflict of any kind. Common masses come forward in each other sorrows and happiness and they are highly qualified, literate and are of very helpful and hospitable nature.

== Demographics ==
The population of Hutmarah was 2,885 at the 2011 Indian census, of which 1,398 were male and 1,487 were female.
