= Aru, Jammu and Kashmir =

Aru
- Village
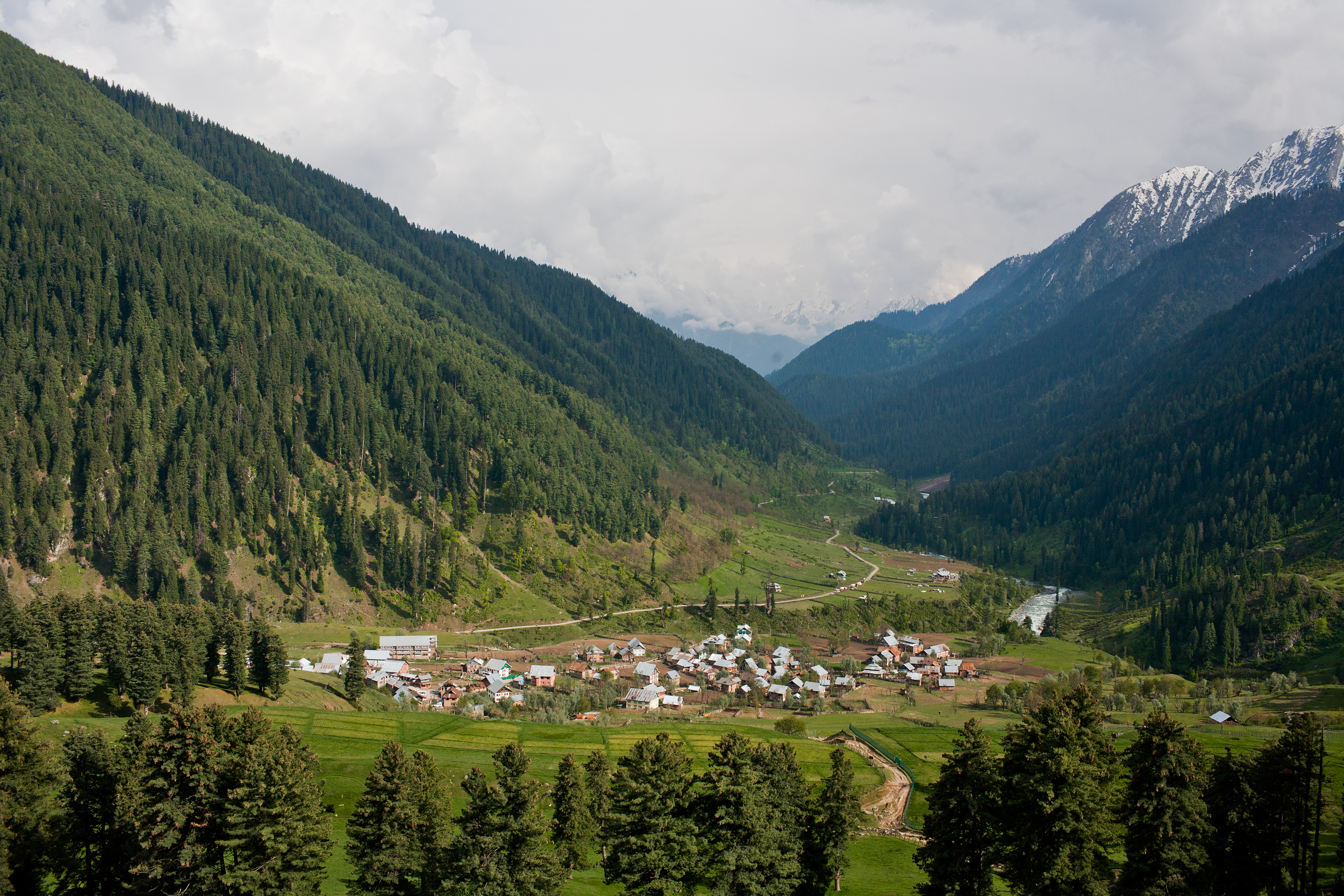
- View of Aru Valley, Pahalgam in Anantnag district, Jammu and Kashmir, India

- Location within Jammu and Kashmir Location within India
- Coordinates: 34°5′27″N 75°15′48″E
- Country: India
- State: Jammu and Kashmir
- District: Anantnag
- Community development block in India: Khoviripora (Pahalgam)
- Elevation: 2,414 m (7,920 ft)

Languages
  - Official: Kashmiri, Urdu, Hindi, Dogri, English
- Time zone: UTC+5:30 (IST)
- Postal Index Number: 192126
- Census code: 00222700

Aru, known as Adav in Kashmiri, is a village, tourist spot in the Anantnag District of Jammu and Kashmir, India in the disputed Kashmir region. It is 53 km from Anantnag city, the district headquarter. It is located around 12 km from Pahalgam, 11 km upstream from the Lidder River. Noted for its scenic meadows, lakes and mountains, it is a base camp for trekking to the Kolahoi Glacier, Tarsar Lake, Marsar and Herbaghwan Lake. The village lies on the left bank of the Aru river, which is a tributary of the Lidder river. Jammu & Kashmir’s biggest Fodder Seed Product Station is also located in the Aru village.

== Tourism ==
The Aru valley is noted for its scenic meadows. It is popular among the tourists for its natural environment and scenery.

The village is a base camp for trekkers to the Kolahoi Glacier, the Tarsar–Marsar lakes and the Katrinag valley. It is also a base for the treks to Lidderwat, the Vishansar–Kishansar lakes and Kangan. The Kolahoi is the largest glacier in the Kashmir Valley, and is located near Mt. Kolahoi (5425m), the highest peak in the Valley. A number of hotels, restaurants and huts are available for boarding and lodging.

There are about 20 alpine lakes, peaks and meadows around the Aru Valley. In the winters, when Aru receives heavy snowfall, skiing and heliskiing are practiced. Other tourist activities include fishing of trout in the Lidder river, trekking, hiking, horse riding, sightseeing and photography.

== Overa-Aru Biosphere Reserve ==
The Overa-Aru Biosphere Reserve is located 76 km from the state capital Srinagar. It has the status of a wildlife sanctuary, and is spread over an area of 511 km^{2}. The altitude ranges from 3,000 to 5,425 m above the sea level. It is known for several rare and endangered species.

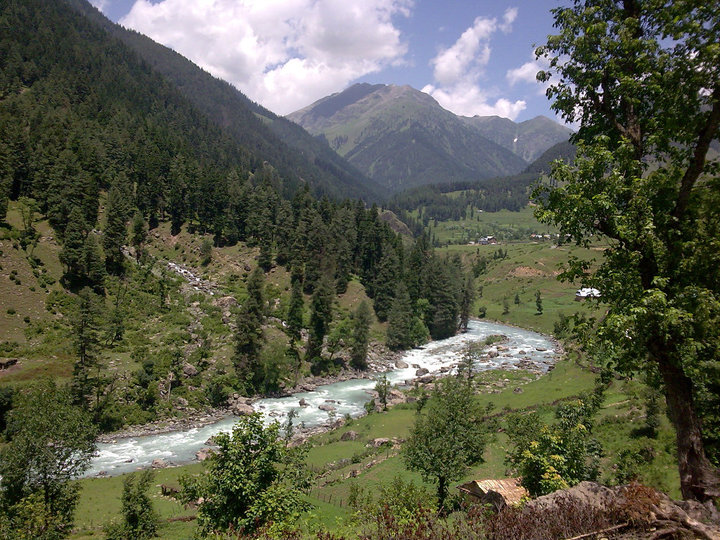
Entrance to Aru Village

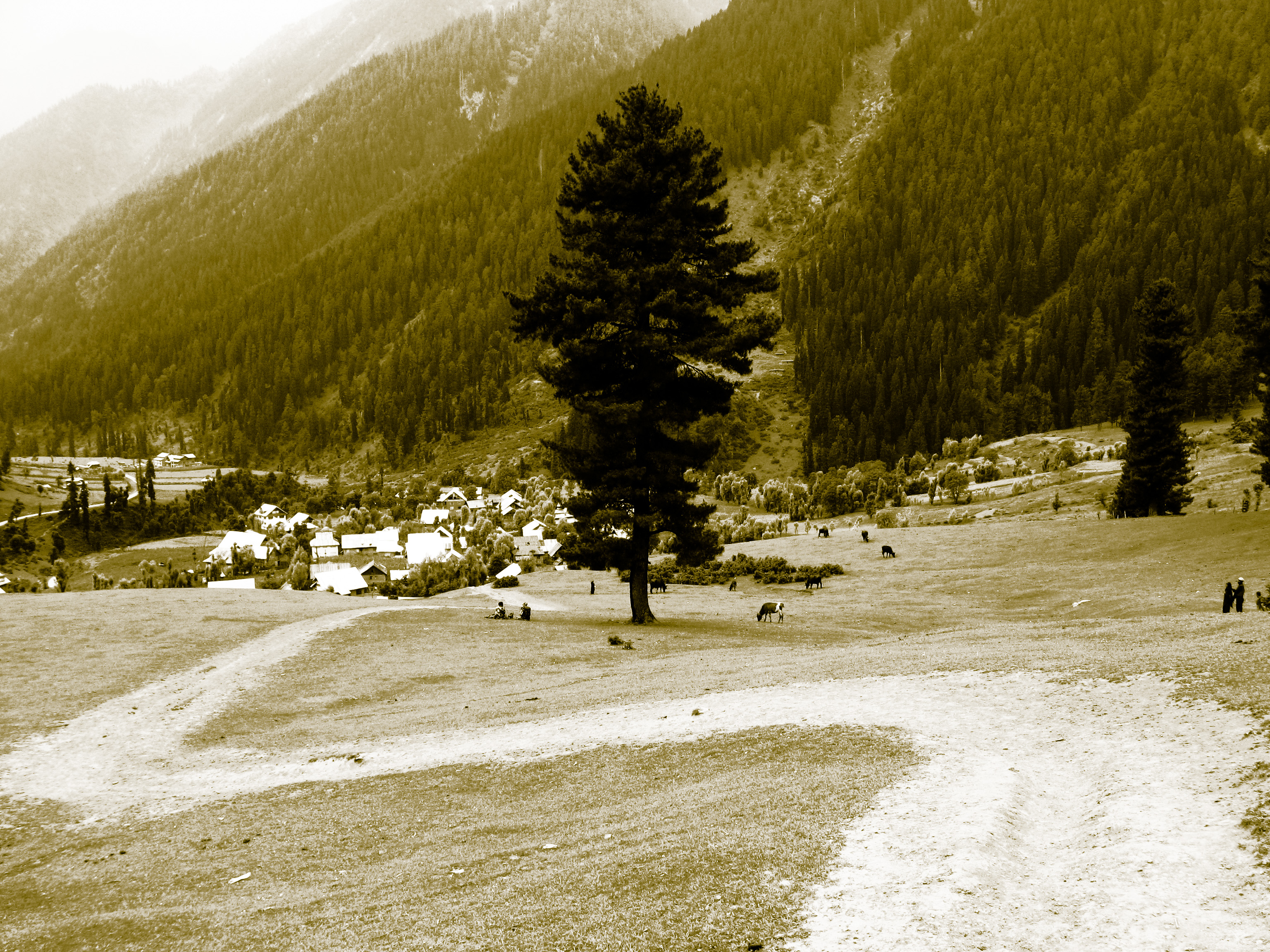
Landscape at Aru Valley

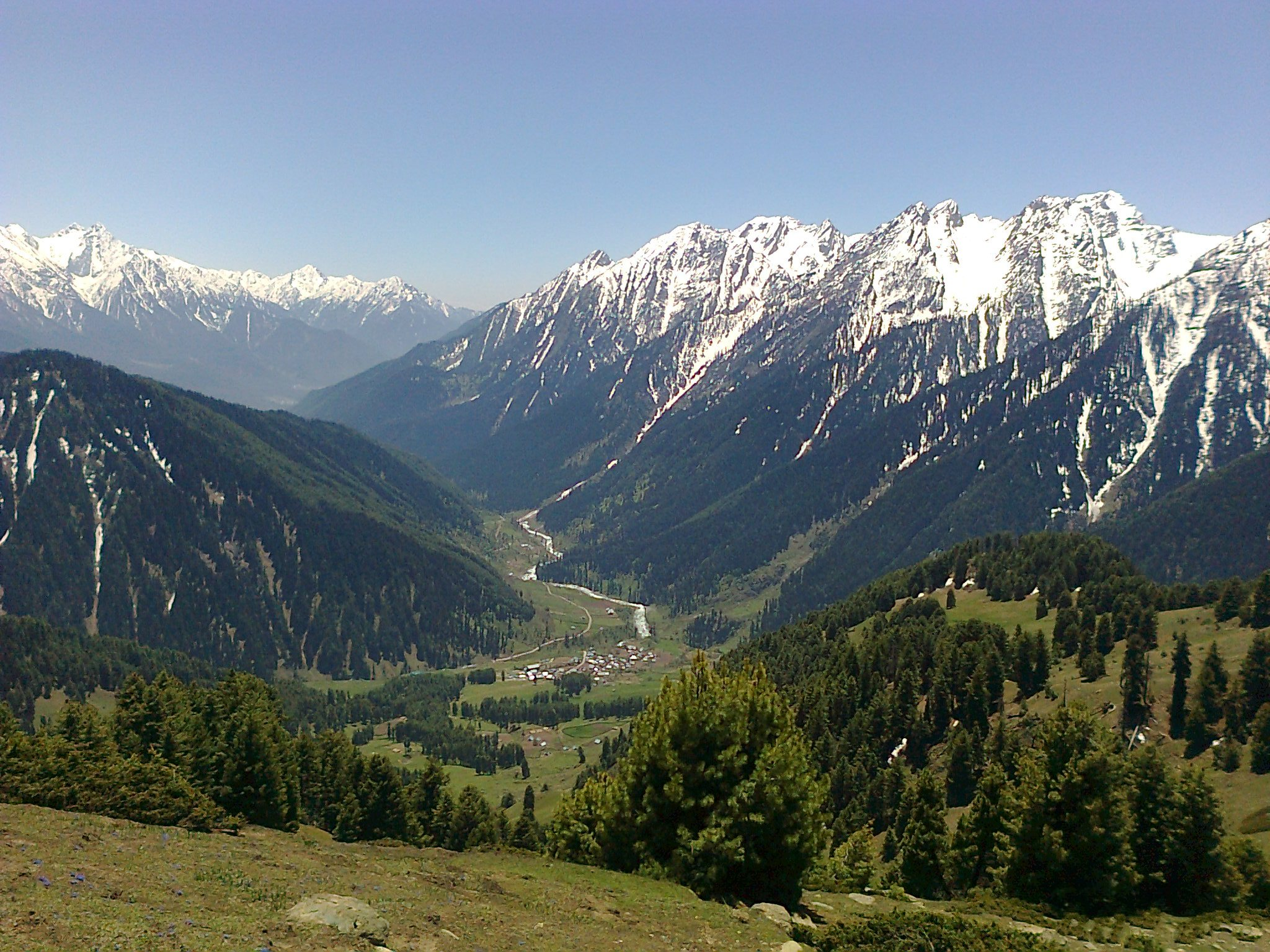
