= Lidder Valley =

Valley in Jammu & Kashmir

- Liddar Valleya
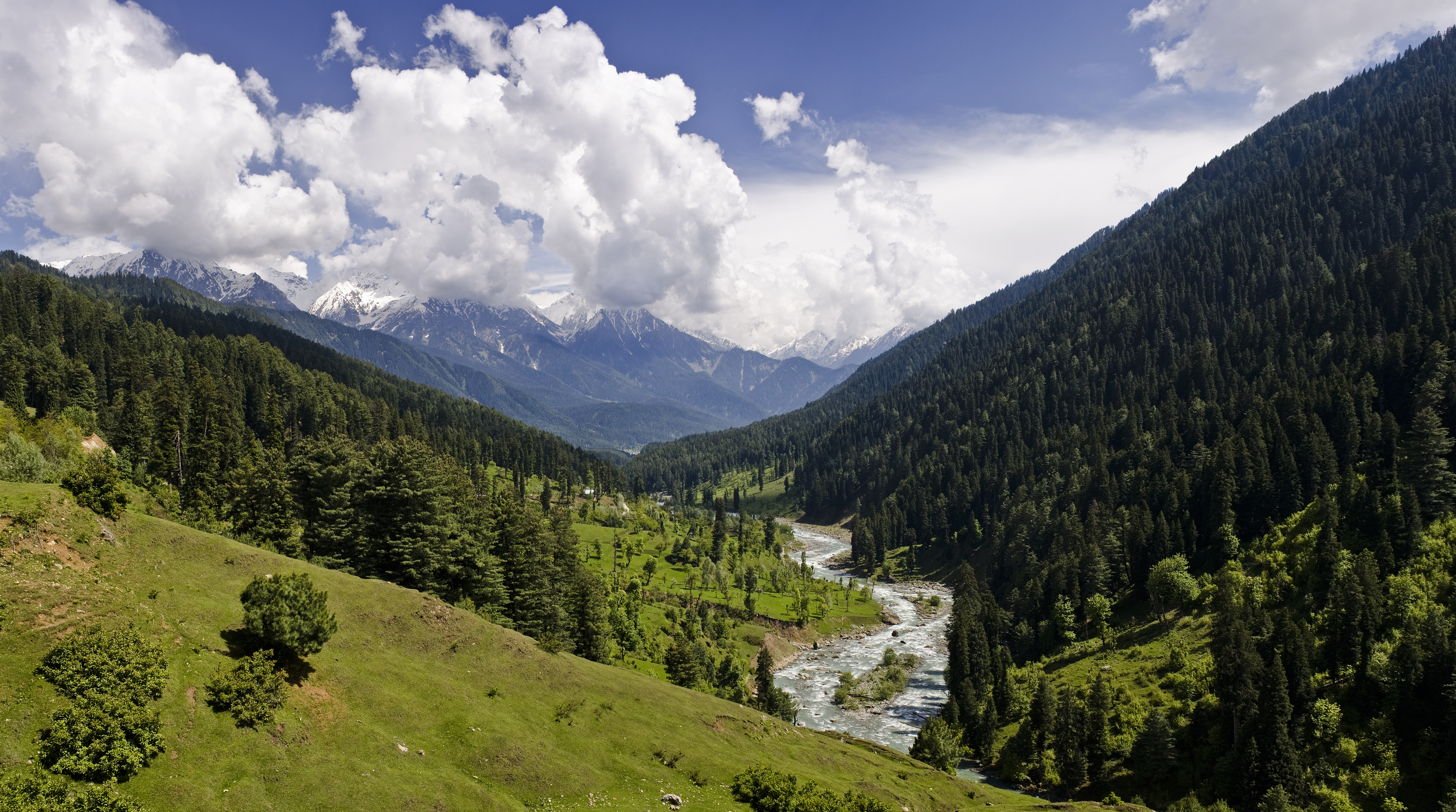
- The Lidder Valley at Pahalgam
- Length: 25 mi (40 km)
- Width: 3 mi (4.8 km)

Geography
- Country: India
- State: Jammu and Kashmir
- Region: Kashmir
- District: Anantnag
- Population center: Pahalgam
- Borders on: Sind Valley (North); Kashmir Valley (West)
- Coordinates: 33°46′35″N 75°12′48″E
- Mountain range: Himalayas
- River: Lidder River
- Interactive map of Lidder Valley

The Lidder Valley or Liddar Valley is a Himalayan sub-valley of the Kashmir Valley, located in the Anantnag district of Jammu and Kashmir, India. The Lidder River flows down the valley. The entrance to the valley lies 7 km northeast from Anantnag town and 62 km southeast from Srinagar, the summer capital of Jammu and Kashmir. It is a 40-km-long gorge valley with an average width of 3 km.

== Geography ==
The Lidder Valley is situated within the jurisdiction of Pahalgam tehsil, of Anantnag district. It is bordered by Kashmir Valley to the west, and Sind Valley to the north, and covers a length of 40 km. It has a maximum width of 5 km. The Lidder basin is surrounded on the south and southeast by the Pir Panjal Range, on the north by the Sind Valley and on the northeast by the Zaskar Range. The Lidder drainage basin has an area of 1134 km^{2}. It is formed by the flow of the Lidder River which flows within a Y-shaped valley, upstream of Pahagam the river diverges into the East Lidder and the West Lidder. The East Lidder of which reaches eastwards from Pahalgam up past Chandanwari and flows from east to west starting in the area of Sheshnag Lake and the Shisram Glacier. The West Lidder originates from the Kolhoi Glacier and runs through green coniferous forests through many alpine meadows. The Lidder Valley provides fresh water supply to other districts and irrigation for agriculture. The Lidder River flows through the entire valley passing several natural landmarks and tourist spots, including Aru, Pahalgam, Betab Valley, and Akad. The main towns in the Lidder Valley are Mandlan, Laripora, Phraslun, Ashmuqam and Seer Hamdan.

== Geology ==
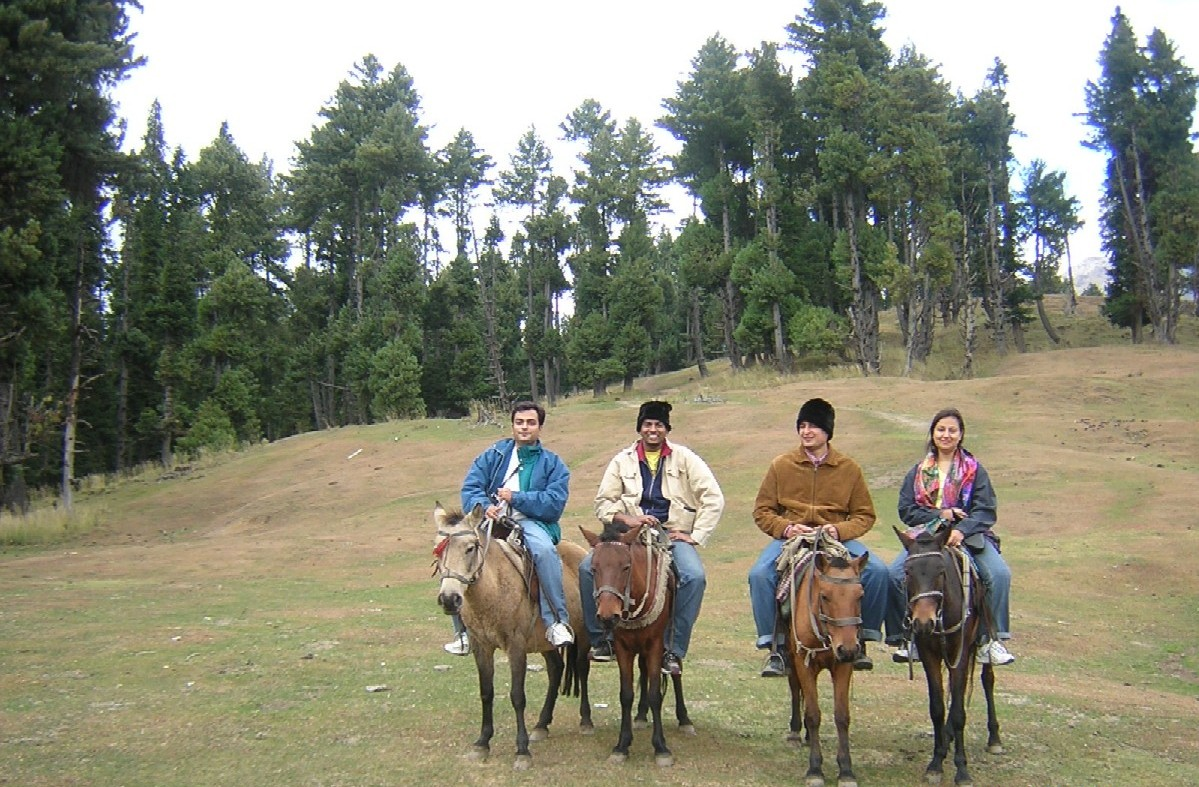
Horse riding at Pahalgam

The Lidder Valley formed over millions of years as the Lidder River cut into the Himalayan Mountains. Today, the river continues to deposit sheets of sand in the lower areas of Anantnag. Gradual erosive processes have washed away bordering forests and created deep gorges at many places.

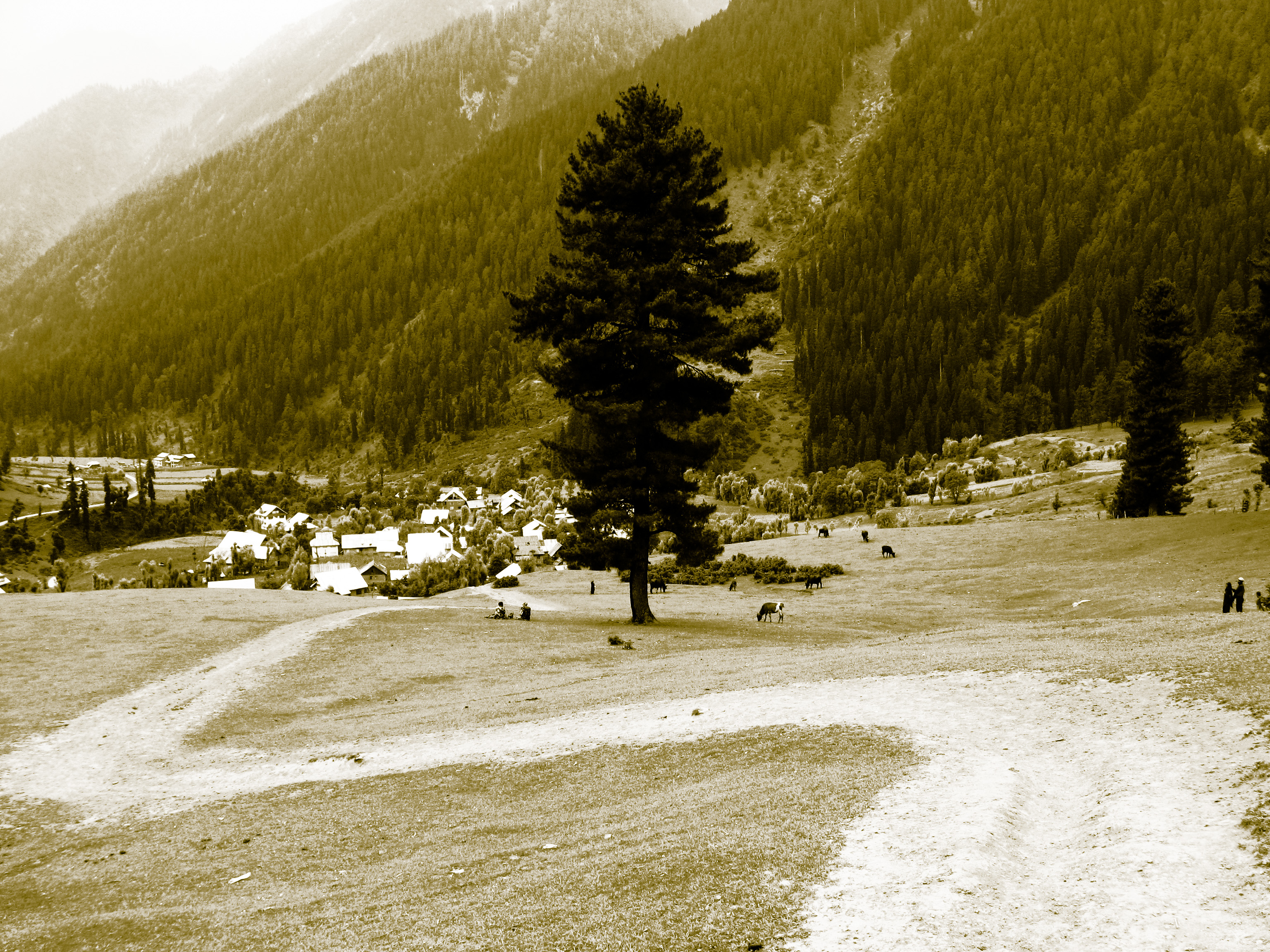
The Lidder Valley at Aru, Jammu and Kashmir

== Ecology ==
The Lidder Valley has many glacier-fed streams, and the tributaries of the Lidder River are home to different types of trout. The valley is the natural habitat of the Himalayan black bear. The Himalayan brown bear, musk deer, snow leopard and hangul have also been spotted in the Aru and Lidderwat areas, which are close to Dachigam National Park.
