= Sind Valley =

Region in the Jammu and Kashmir, India

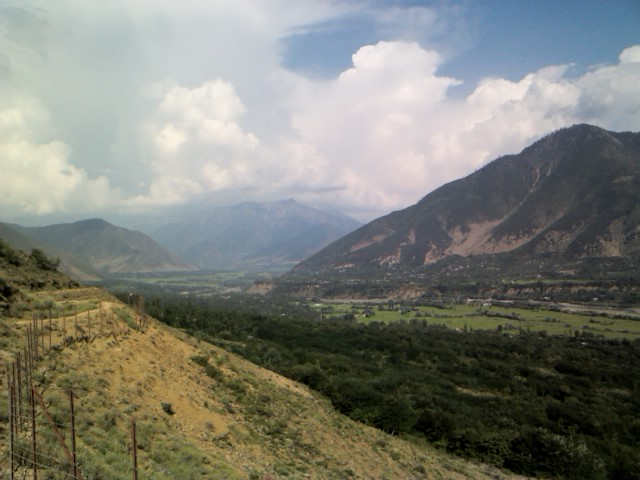
- The Sind Valley at Manigam

- Location within India
- Length: 40 mi (64 km)
- Width: 0.6 mi (0.97 km)

Geography
- Location: Kangan, Ganderbal, Jammu and Kashmir, India
- Borders on: Zojila (East); Kashmir Valley (West)
- Coordinates: 34°17′21″N 74°48′45″E
- River: Sind River
- Interactive map of Sind Valley

The Sind Valley is a Himalayan sub-valley of the Kashmir Valley in the Indian union territory of Jammu and Kashmir. The entrance of the Sind Valley lies 33 kilometres (21 mi) northeast of Srinagar the capital of Jammu and Kashmir. It is a 65 kilometres (40 mi) long gorge valley with an average width of 1 kilometre (0.62 mi).

== History ==
The Sind Valley had a strategic importance on the ancient Silk Road. It worked as a bridge between India, China and Central Asia along with Srinagar-Skardu Route. First Hinduism and Buddhism and then Islam spread in Kashmir through this route. The Sind Valley still connects Ladakh with the rest of India through a National Highway NH 1D, though it remains closed during winter due to heavy snowfall at Zojila.

== Geography ==
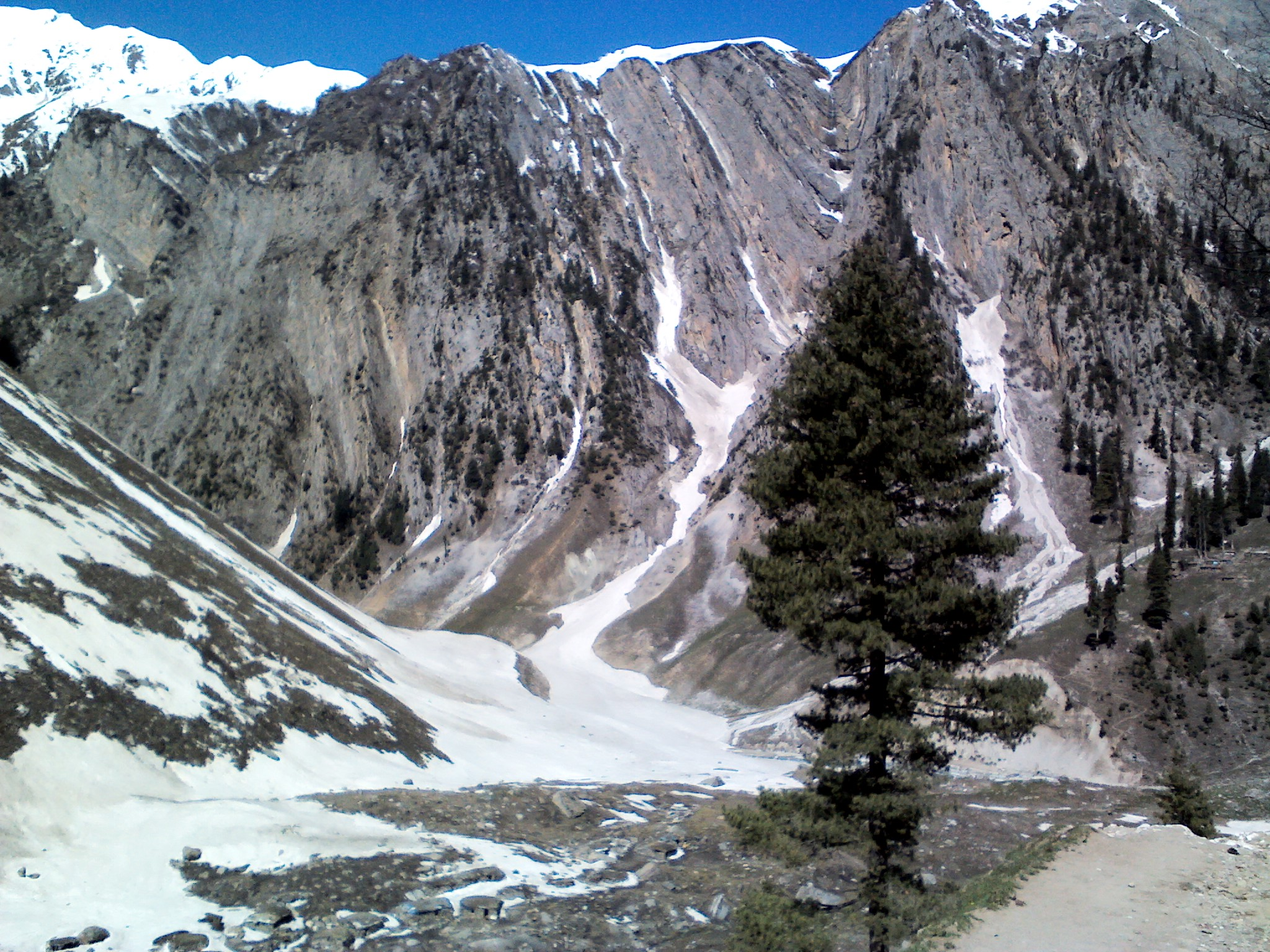
Sind Valley at Domail Baltal

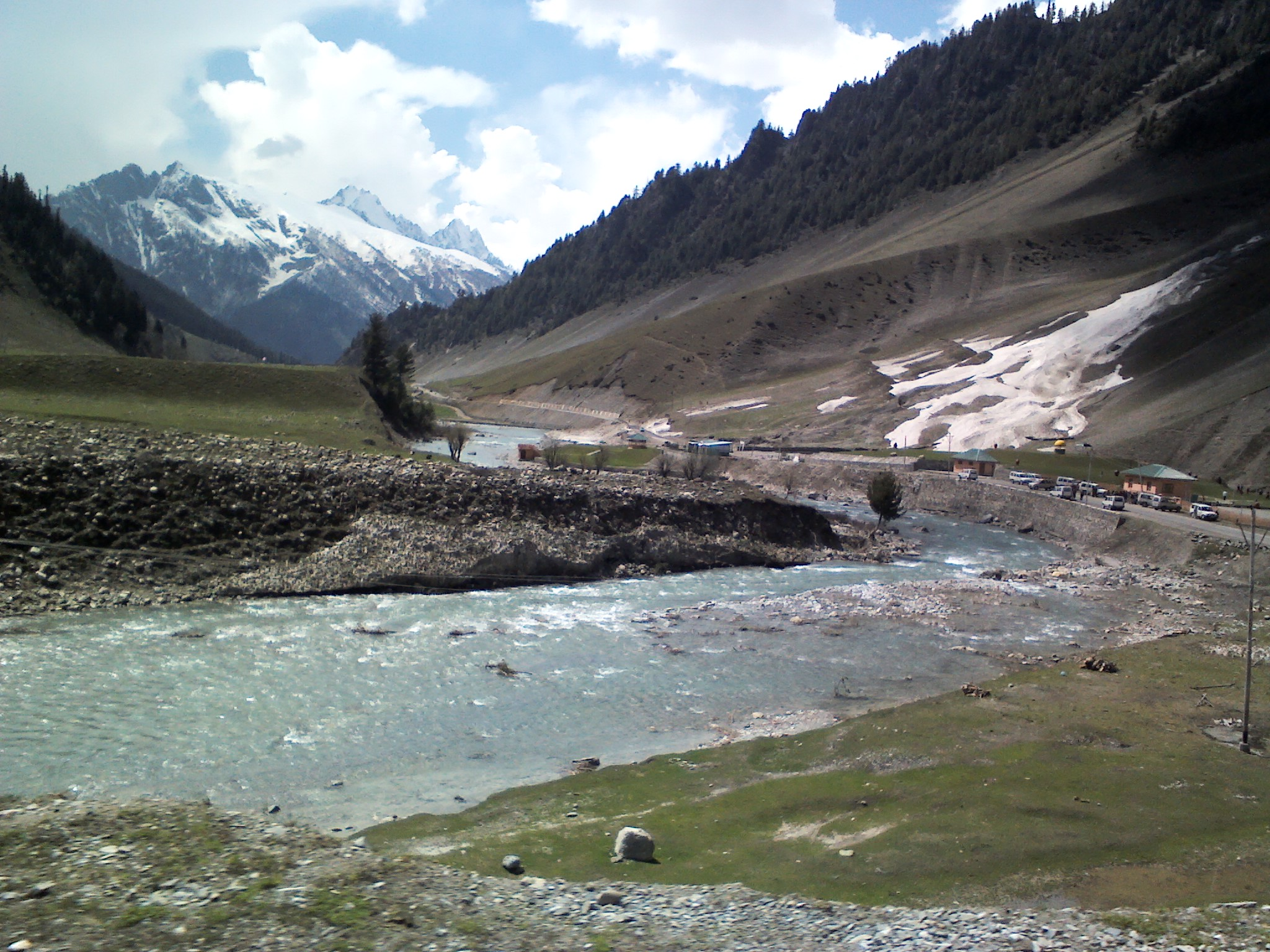
Sind River at Sonamarg

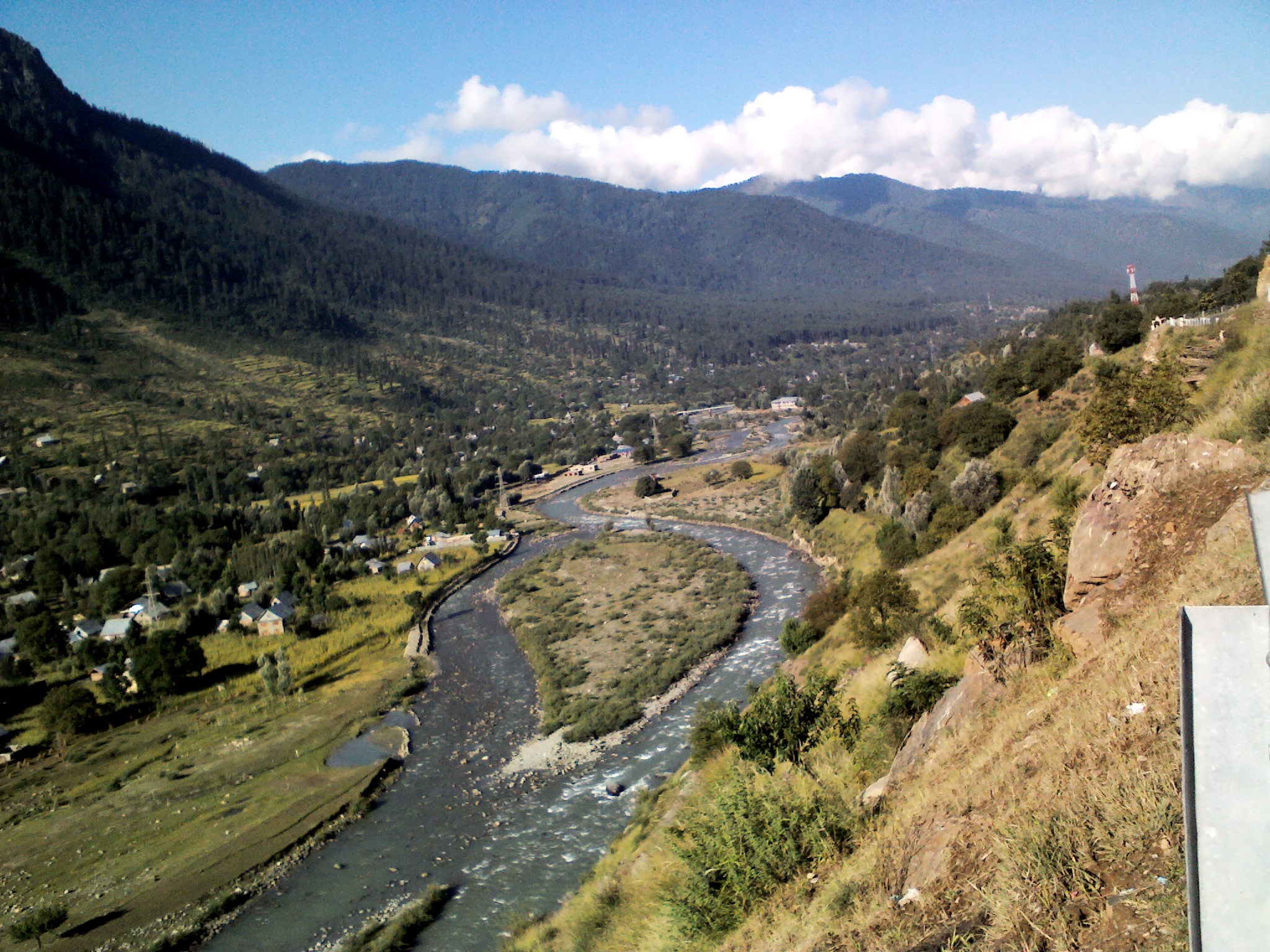
Sind Valley at Gatribal

The Sind Valley is situated within the jurisdiction of Kangan tehsil, of Ganderbal district. It is bordered by the Kashmir Valley in the west, Zojila in the east, Gurez Valley of the Kishanganga River in the north and the Lidder Valley in the south. It has a length of 65 kilometres (40 mi) and reaches a maximum length of 9 kilometres (5.6 mi) at village Preng towards the north through a stream Wangath Nala which flows down from Gangabal Lake. At some places the width is less than 500 metres (1,600 ft) which gives only space to NH 1D, a National Highway which connects Ladakh and the Kashmir Valley. It is formed by the flow of the Sind River which flows down from east to west. The River originates from the inner Himalayas at Drass in Machoi Glacier and runs through green forests of pine and fir and alpine meadows of Sonamarg. The Sind Valley contributes heavily to the economy of the State, through generation of hydroelectricity, provides fresh water supply to other districts and irrigation for agriculture. The Sind River flows through the entire valley passing several natural landmarks, tourist spots including Baltal, The meadow of gold, Gagangear, Naranag and Wayil. The main towns in the valley are Gund, Mammer, Kangan, Wangath, Preng, Wussan and Manigam.

== Geology ==
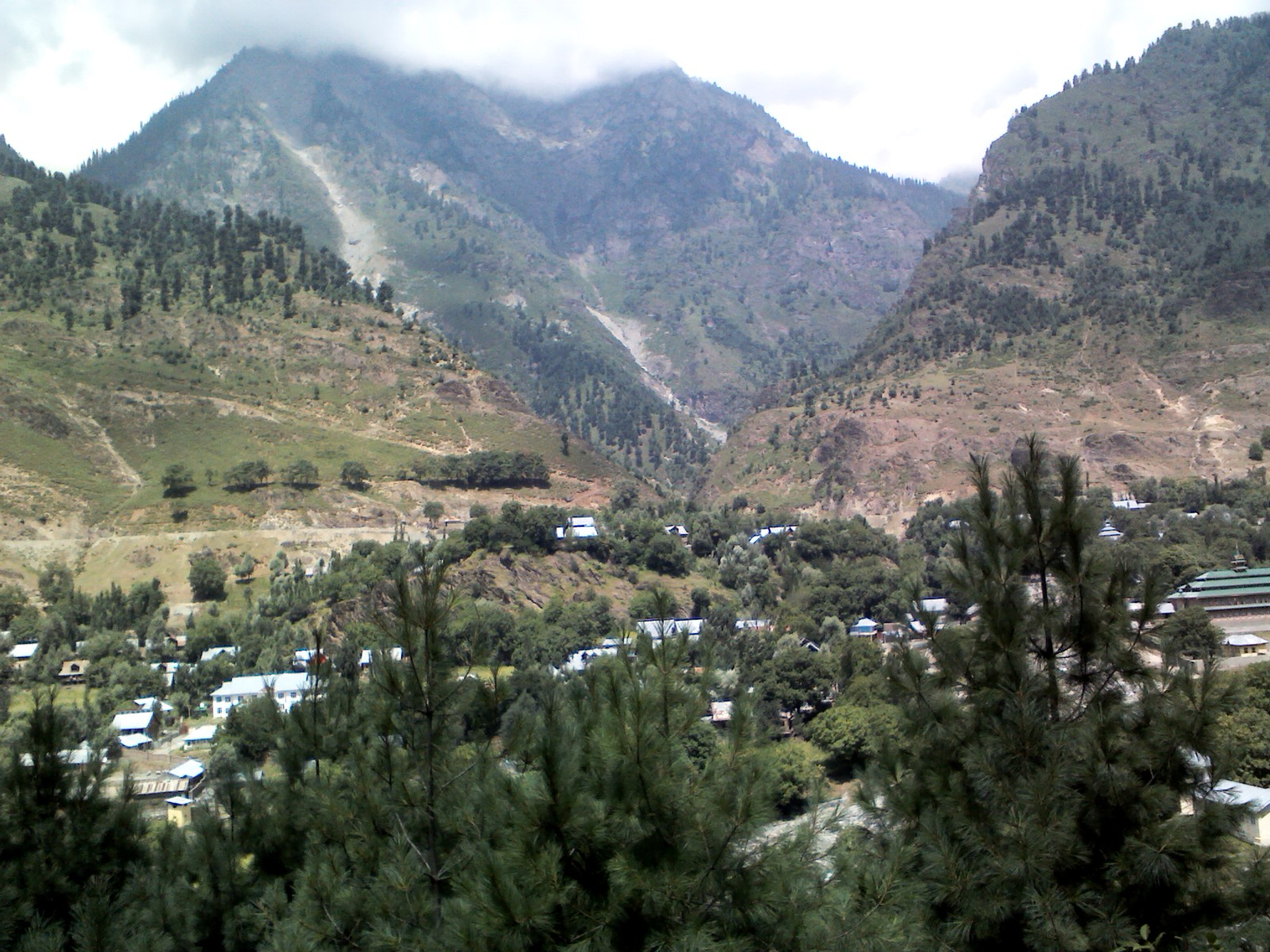
Gund, a village in Sind Valley

The Sind Valley has formed over a period of several thousand years as the Sind River cuts into the Himalayan mountains. The glaciers of the valley are shrinking. Today, the river continues to deposit the sheets of sand in the lower areas of Ganderbal. Gradual erosive processes have washed away side forests and created a deep gorge at many places.

== Ecology ==
The Sind Valley has many glacier fed streams, the tributaries of the Sind River are home to different types of trout among of which is the brown trout. The valley is the natural habitat of Himalayan black bear, the Himalayan brown bear, musk deer, snow leopard and hangul. Markhor and ibex are also spotted in Sonamarg of the Sind Valley.
