= Manigam =

Coordinates: 33°48′N 75°15′E

Manigam is situated in Anantnag District and located 1 kilometer from Seer Hamdan in the Anantnag district in the Indian Union Territory of Jammu and Kashmir. It is one of 105 villages in the Anantnag Block of Khovripora. The village is situated on a small plateau and it acts as connecting link between Seer Hamdan and Salia . The main occupation of the people is farming. Many people travel to other parts of country for selling shawls during winter season and some are working in the private sector. One Common Service center in Manigam providing all digital services to citizens. It is because of this center this village is a digital village.

== Demographics ==
Kashmiri is the Local language in Manigam. Other languages spoken are Urdu and English.
