= Pahalgam =

Town in Jammu and Kashmir, India

Pahalgam Pahalgom
- Town
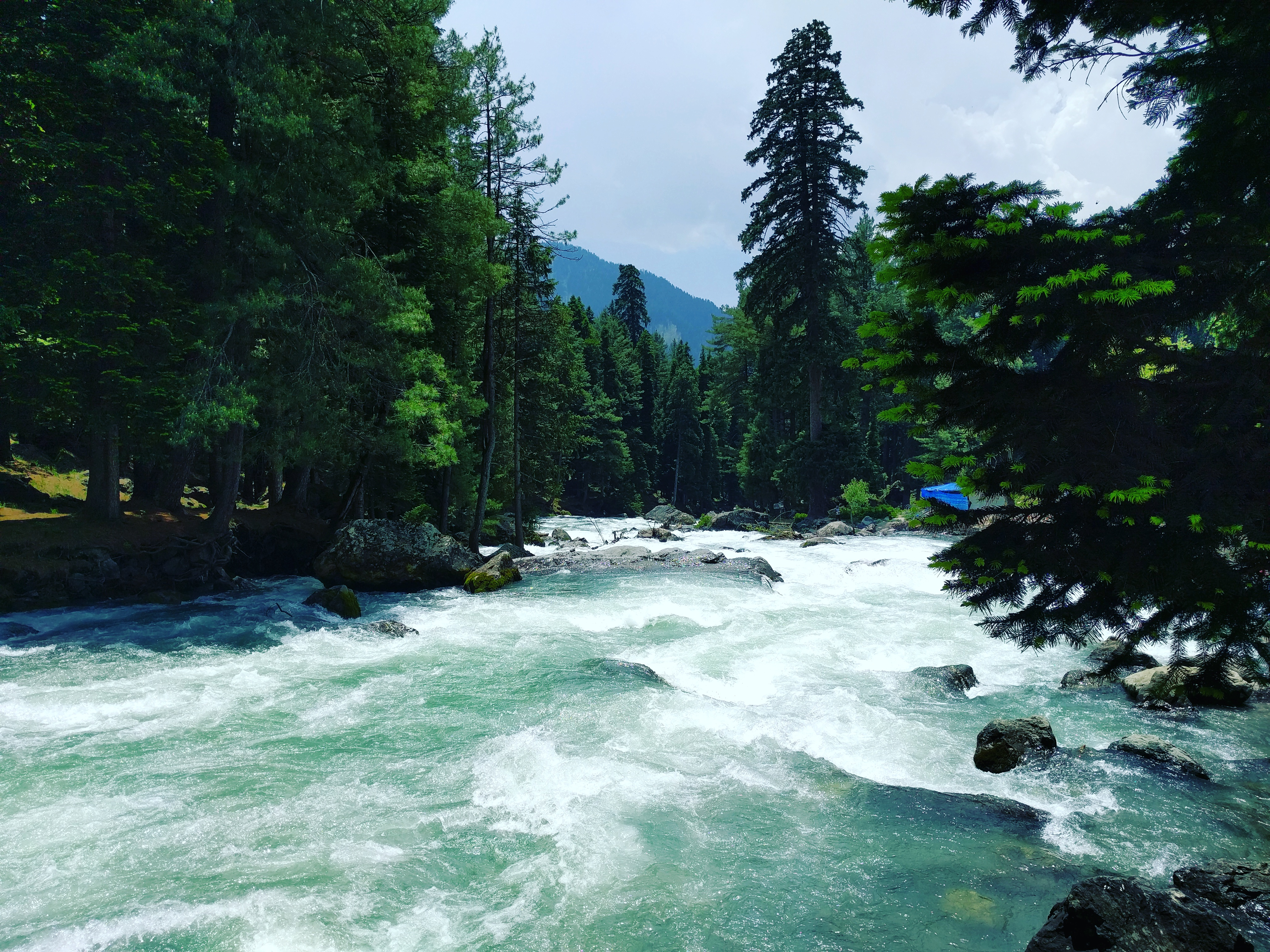
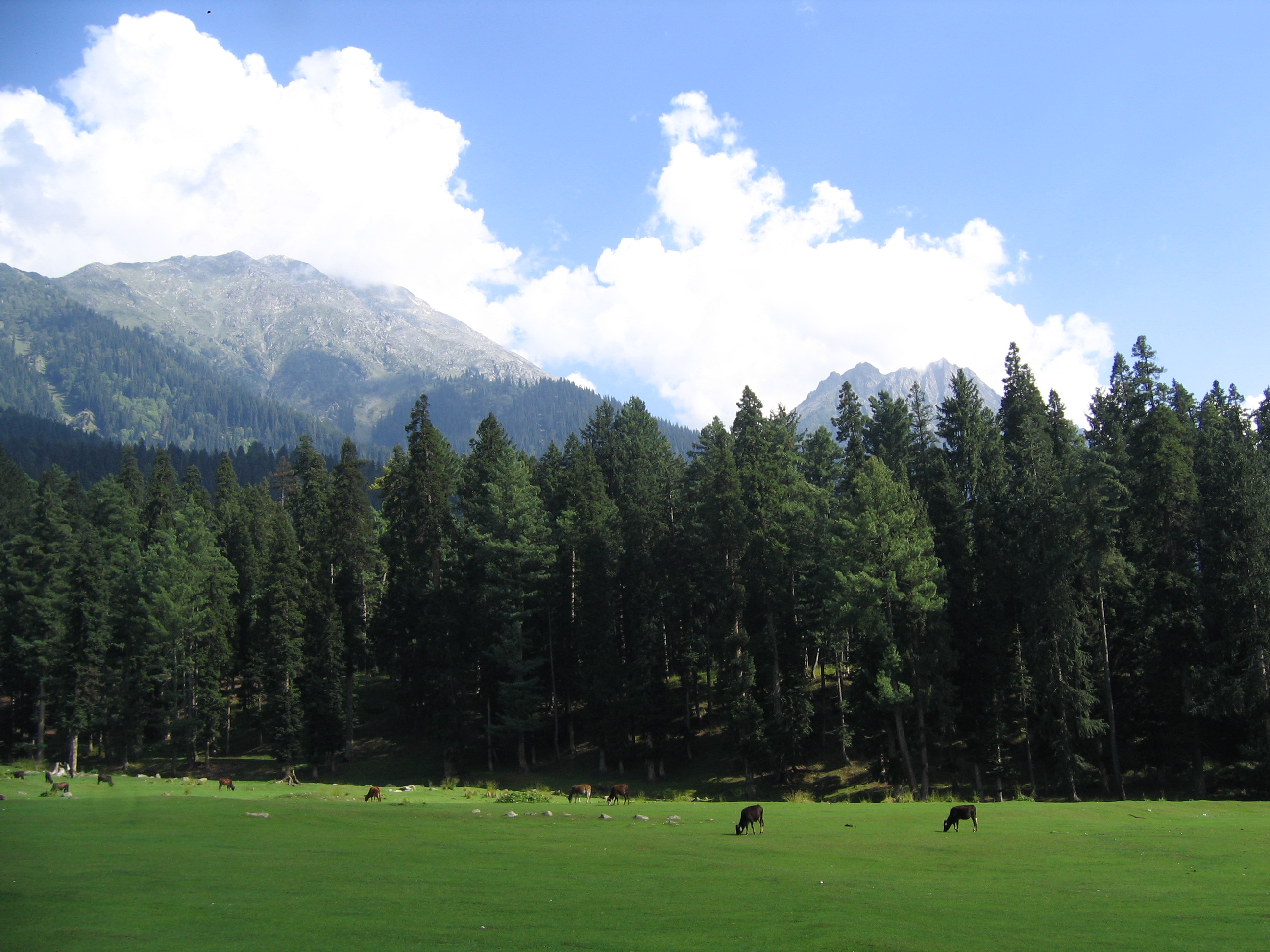
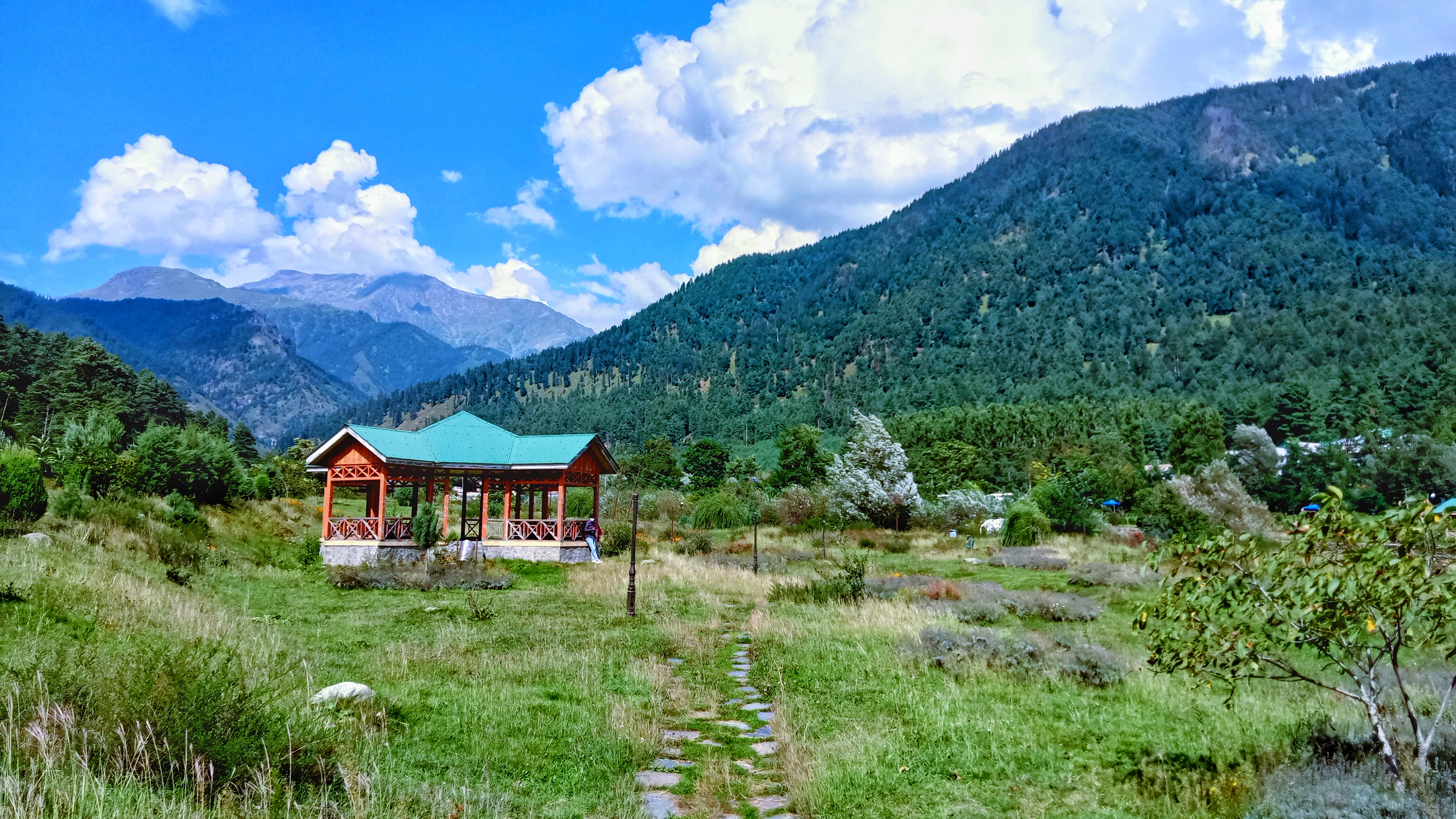
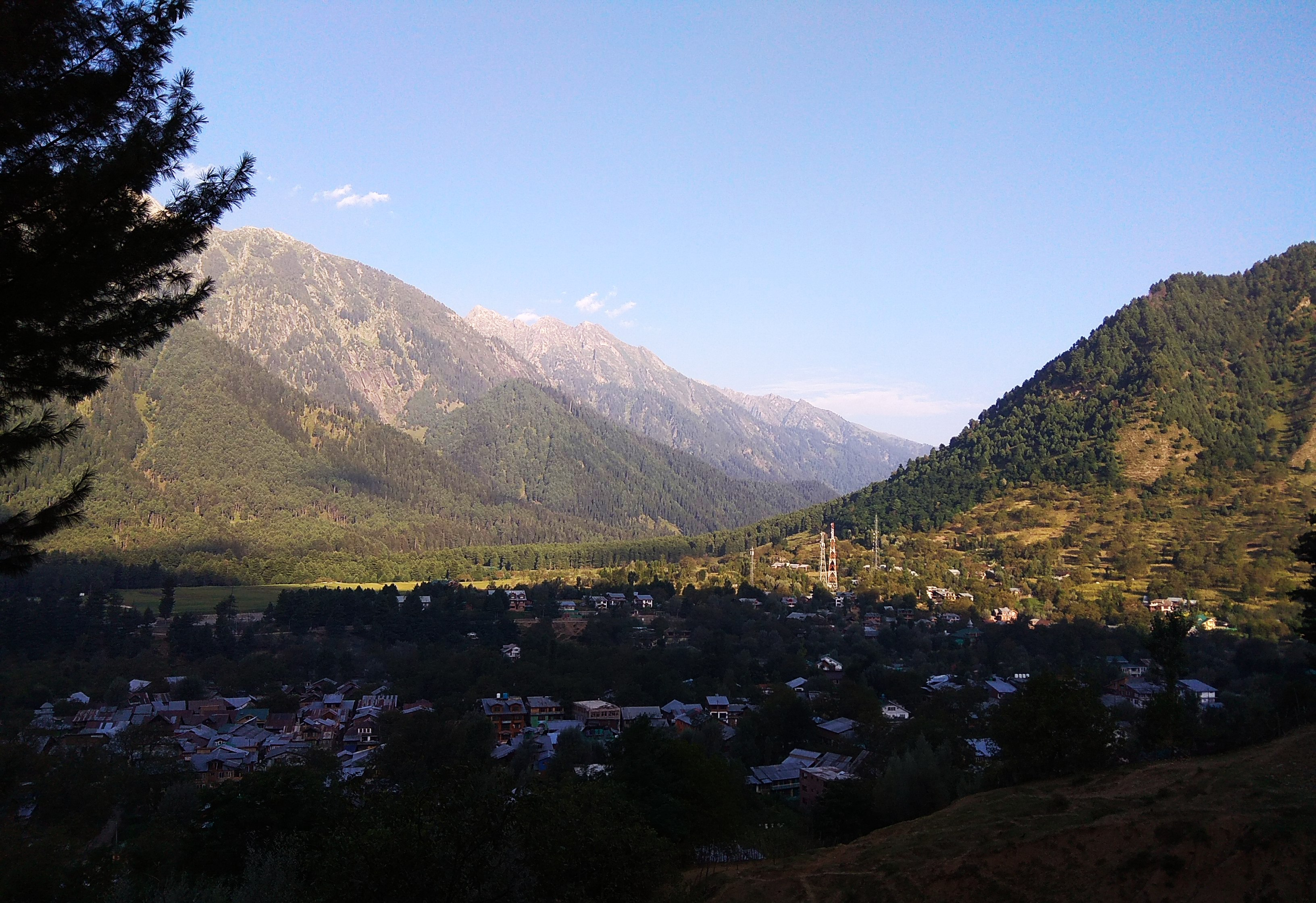
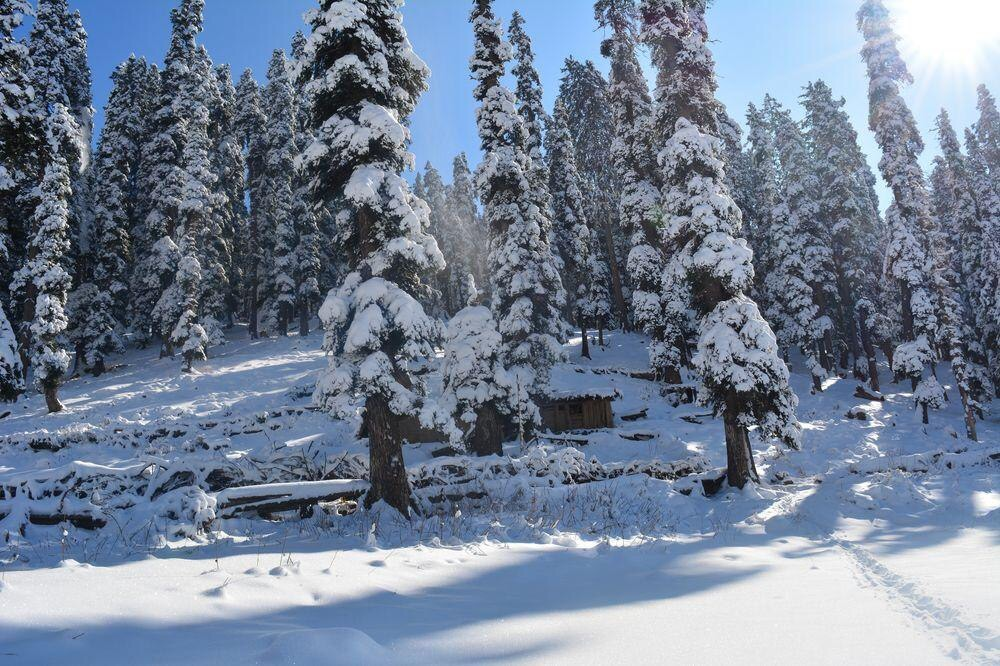
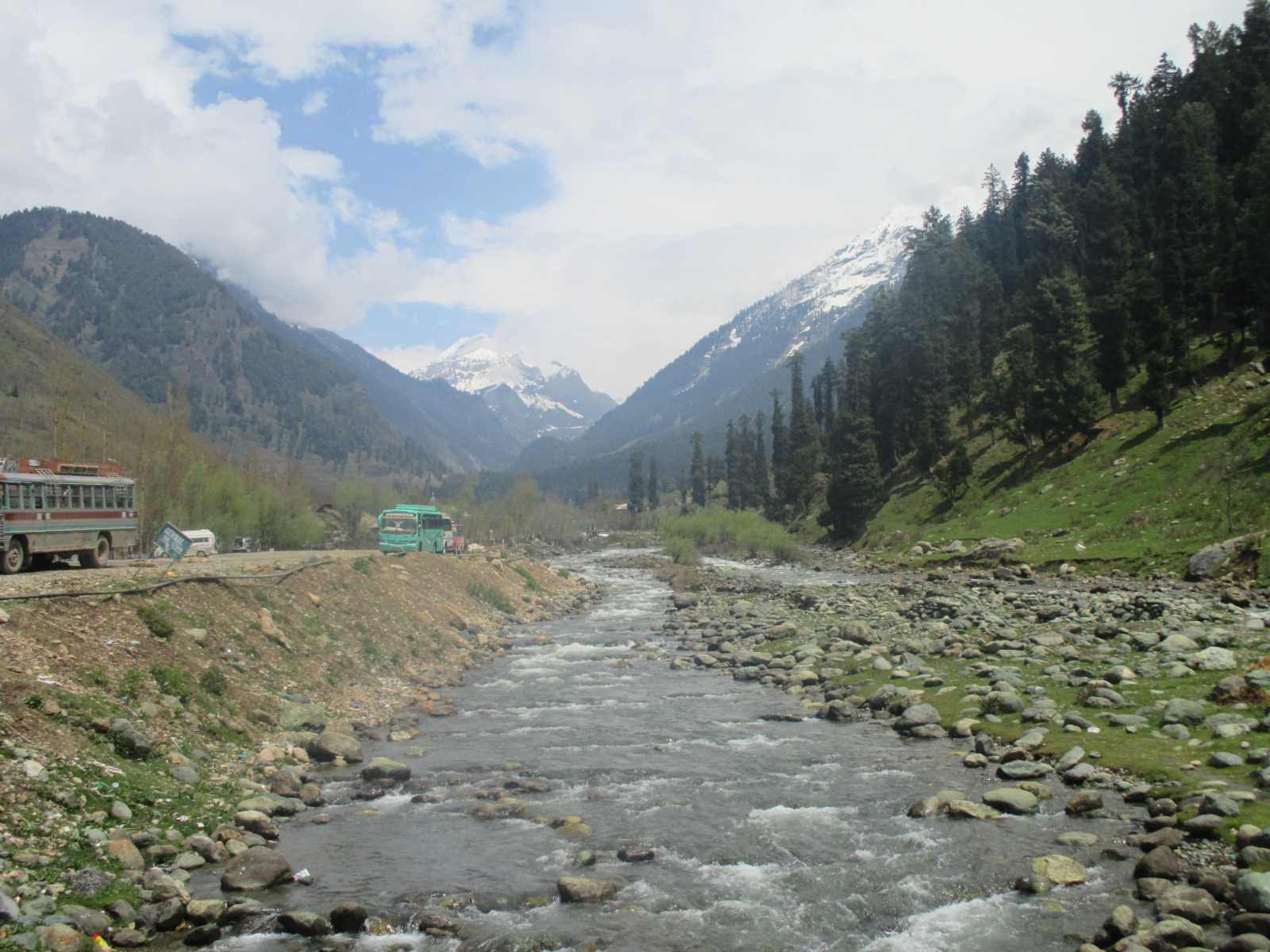
- Lidder River Baisaran Valley Lavender Park View of the town Trees above the valley in winter View of the valley

- Location in Jammu and Kashmir, India Pahalgam (India)
- Coordinates: 34.01°N 75.19°E
- Country: India
- Union Territory: Jammu and Kashmir
- District: Anantnag

Government
  - Body: Pahalgam Municipal Committee

Area
  - Total: 18.02 km^{2} (6.96 sq mi)
- Elevation: 2,200 m (7,200 ft)

Population (2011)
  - Total: 9,264
  - Density: 514.1/km^{2} (1,332/sq mi)

Languages
  - Official: Kashmiri, Urdu, Hindi, Dogri, English
- Time zone: UTC+5:30 (IST)
- PIN: 192126
- STD Code: +91-01936
- Vehicle registration: JK-03
- Website: anantnag.nic.in/tourist-place/pahalgam/

Pahalgam (Urdu pronunciation: [pɛɦɛlɡɑːm]) or Pahalgom (Kashmiri pronunciation: [pəhəlʲɡoːm]) is a town in Anantnag district of the Indian union territory of Jammu and Kashmir. It is located on the banks of Lidder River at an altitude of 2,200 m (7,200 ft) in the Vale of Kashmir. Pahalgam is the headquarters of the Pahalgam tehsil, one of the eleven tehsils in Anantnag district.

Located about 45 km (28 mi) from Anantnag, the town is a popular tourist destination and hill station. The town is the starting point of the annual pilgrimage to the Amarnath Temple, which takes place in July–August.

== Etymology ==
Pahalgam literally means "village of the shepherds" in Kashmiri, with "Pạhạlʸ" meaning shepherds and "Gōm" meaning village. In Hindu literature, the region is mentioned as "Bailgaon", meaning "village of the bull", to indicate where the Hindu god Shiva left his bull on the way to Amarnath.

== Geography ==
Pahalgam is located in Anantnag district of the Indian union territory of Jammu and Kashmir. It is located at an altitude of 2,200 m (7,200 ft) in the Lidder Valley, which extends east of Jhelum River in the Vale of Kashmir. The two streams of Lidder River—East and West Lidder—join near Pahalgam before proceeding through the narrow valley. At Pahalgam, the valley divides into two, one heading towards Amarnath in the northeast and another leading to Aru in the northwest. The region is made up of volcanic and limestone rocks interspersed with asymmetrical roche rocks. The vegetation in the region is dominated by evergreen fir and coniferous trees such as pine and spruce.

=== Climate ===
Pahalgam has a temperate climate (Köppen: Cfb/Dfb), with mild summers and cold winters. The temperature variation across the day in minimal in the winter months of December to February. Cold winds can result in a steep decrease in nighttime temperatures in winter to below zero. Winter can result in heavy snowfall of up to 4 m (13 ft) thick. Summer extends from June to October, when the temperatures are at a maximum. Pahalgam receives most of the precipitation from late winter after November to May before the onset of summer.

Climate data for Pahalgam (1991–2020, extremes 1978–2020)
Month	Jan	Feb	Mar	Apr	May	Jun	Jul	Aug	Sep	Oct	Nov	Dec	Year
Record high °C (°F)	13.8 (56.8)	17.6 (63.7)	23.9 (75.0)	27.4 (81.3)	30.8 (87.4)	32.0 (89.6)	31.5 (88.7)	32.2 (90.0)	30.0 (86.0)	27.7 (81.9)	23.0 (73.4)	15.6 (60.1)	32.2 (90.0)
Mean daily maximum °C (°F)	4.9 (40.8)	7.2 (45.0)	12.5 (54.5)	17.6 (63.7)	21.3 (70.3)	24.2 (75.6)	25.5 (77.9)	25.4 (77.7)	23.7 (74.7)	19.9 (67.8)	13.1 (55.6)	7.9 (46.2)	16.9 (62.5)
Daily mean °C (°F)	−0.6 (30.9)	1.6 (34.9)	6.1 (43.0)	10.4 (50.7)	13.5 (56.3)	16.5 (61.7)	19.2 (66.6)	19.2 (66.6)	16.2 (61.2)	11.2 (52.2)	5.8 (42.4)	1.8 (35.2)	10.1 (50.1)
Mean daily minimum °C (°F)	−6.1 (21.0)	−3.9 (25.0)	−0.3 (31.5)	3.3 (37.9)	5.8 (42.4)	8.9 (48.0)	12.9 (55.2)	13.0 (55.4)	8.7 (47.7)	2.6 (36.7)	−1.4 (29.5)	−4.2 (24.4)	3.5 (38.3)
Record low °C (°F)	−18.6 (−1.5)	−17.3 (0.9)	−13.0 (8.6)	−4.0 (24.8)	−1.0 (30.2)	1.5 (34.7)	2.0 (35.6)	4.0 (39.2)	0.6 (33.1)	−5.1 (22.8)	−10.8 (12.6)	−15.7 (3.7)	−18.6 (−1.5)
Average rainfall mm (inches)	136.0 (5.35)	144.5 (5.69)	171.2 (6.74)	144.2 (5.68)	120.1 (4.73)	91.2 (3.59)	107.1 (4.22)	114.9 (4.52)	95.1 (3.74)	38.2 (1.50)	51.3 (2.02)	59.7 (2.35)	1,273.5 (50.14)
Average rainy days	8.1	9.3	10.3	10.0	9.8	8.3	8.8	9.0	7.0	3.3	3.0	3.9	90.8
Average relative humidity (%) (at 17:30 IST)	80	76	66	60	57	58	64	68	65	59	68	75	66
Source: India Meteorological Department

== Demographics ==
Religion in Pahalgam (2011)
Religion	Percent
Islam	80.09%
Hinduism	17.64%
Sikhism	1.38%
Other or not stated	0.99%

As of 2011, Pahalgam had a population of 9,264 people. Males constitute 59.8% of the population and females 40.2%. The town had an average literacy rate of 64.9% amongst the population of seven years and above. About 48% of the eligible age group were employed full-time, and 10% had casual employment. Scheduled Castes and Scheduled Tribes made up about two percent of the population. Islam was the major religion, with 80% adherents, with Hindus forming the second largest group (17.6%).

== Administration ==
Pahalgam is administered by the Pahalgam Municipal Committee. The municipal committee is responsible for providing basic civic amenities such as water supply, sanitation and waste management, and other government services. The town is divided into 13 wards which elect their own local body representative to the municipal council.

== Transportation ==
Pahalgam is well-connected with other regions of Jammu and Kashmir by roads. The NH 501 connects Pahalgam with Anantnag. State-run bus services and private buses connect the town with Anantnag, Jammu, and Srinagar. The nearest major rail heads are located at Udhampur and Jammu, about 217 km (135 mi) and 285 km (177 mi) away respectively. The nearest airport is the Srinagar International Airport, about 95 km (59 mi) from Pahalgam.

== Tourism ==
Pahalgam's location in the Lidder valley and its climate has led to the town becoming a popular tourist destination and hill station. In 2015, the town had about 7,020 beds for tourists.

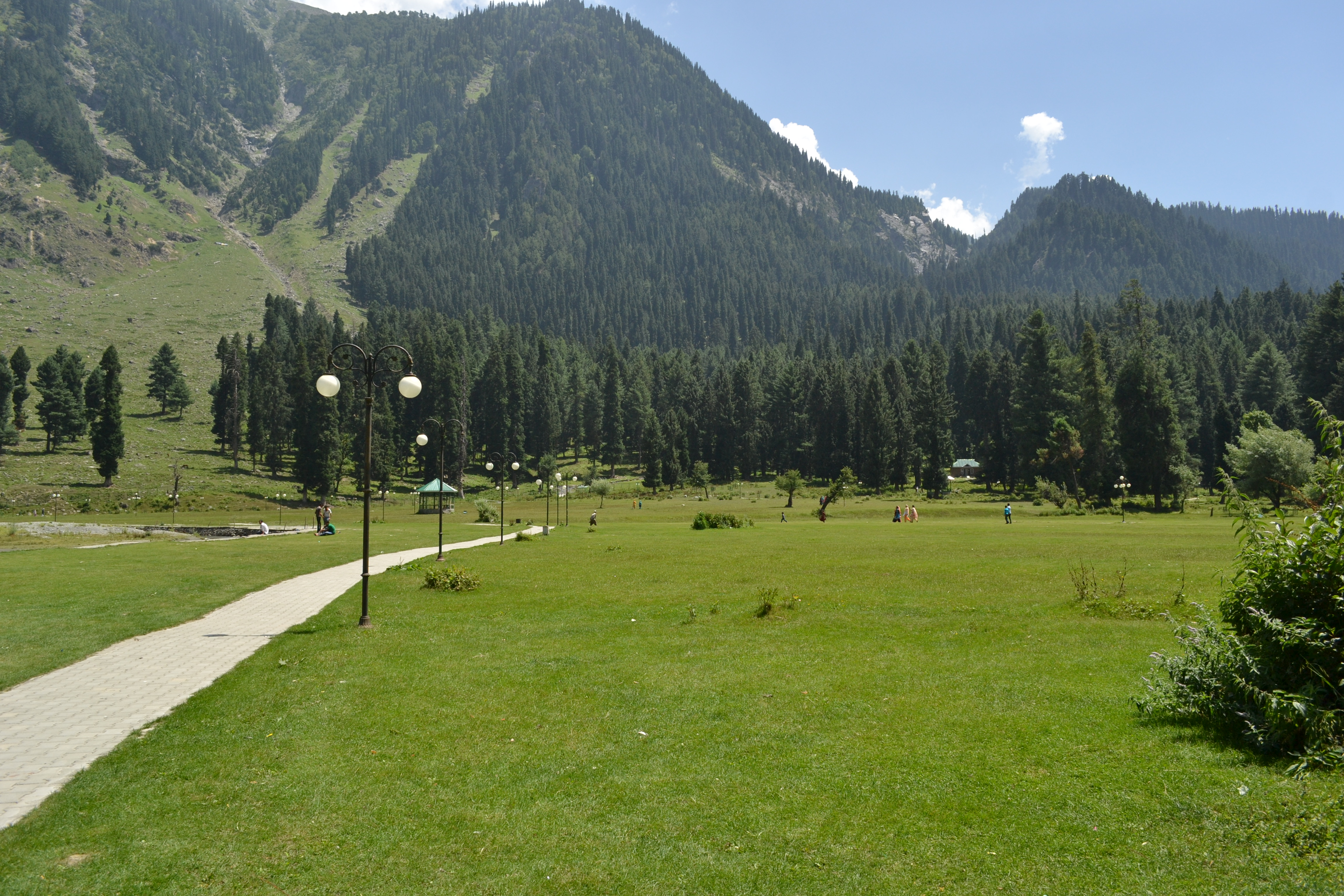
Betaab Valley near Pahalgam

The Amarnath Temple is a Hindu pilgrimage site situated above the Pahalgam valley. The town forms the base camp for the yatra to the temple that takes place every year in the months of July–August, and results in a seasonal influx of pilgrims. As per Hindu mythology, Shiva is believed to have left his mount Nandi in Pahalgam, the moon he carries on his head in Chandanwari, the snakes around his neck at Sheshnag Lake, and the five natural elements at Panchtarni before entering the Amarnath cave. The yatra begins from Chandanwari, situated about 16 km (9.9 mi) from Pahalgam, and proceeds towards Amarnath via Sheshnag Lake and Panchtarni.

Kolahoi Glacier is a hanging glacier situated up the Lidder Valley, just below Kolahoi Peak. It is accessible via a 35 km (22 mi) trail from Pahalgam via Aru. Baisaran and Betaab valleys are verdant meadows flanked by mountains and evergreen trees, located close to Pahalgam. Pahalgam Golf Course, also known as Lidder Valley Golf Course, is an 18-hole golf course inaugurated in 2011.

The high influx of seasonal tourists results in the production of large quantities of solid wastes, which overwhelms the waste management system, and leads to dumping of wastes throughout the town. With an estimated 74% of the total municipal wastes coming from tourism, the dumping had increased the probability of waterborne diseases downstream of the Lidder River and other health issues.

=== 2025 Pahalgam attack ===
On 22 April 2025, militants affiliated with The Resistance Front opened fire on a group of tourists at Baisaran valley near Pahalgam, killing at least 28 people and injuring more than 20 others.

== See also ==
- Aharbal
- Gulmarg
- Kausar Nag
- Martand Sun Temple
- Sonamarg
- Sopore
