= Mount Kolahoi =

Mountain in Jammu & Kashmir, India

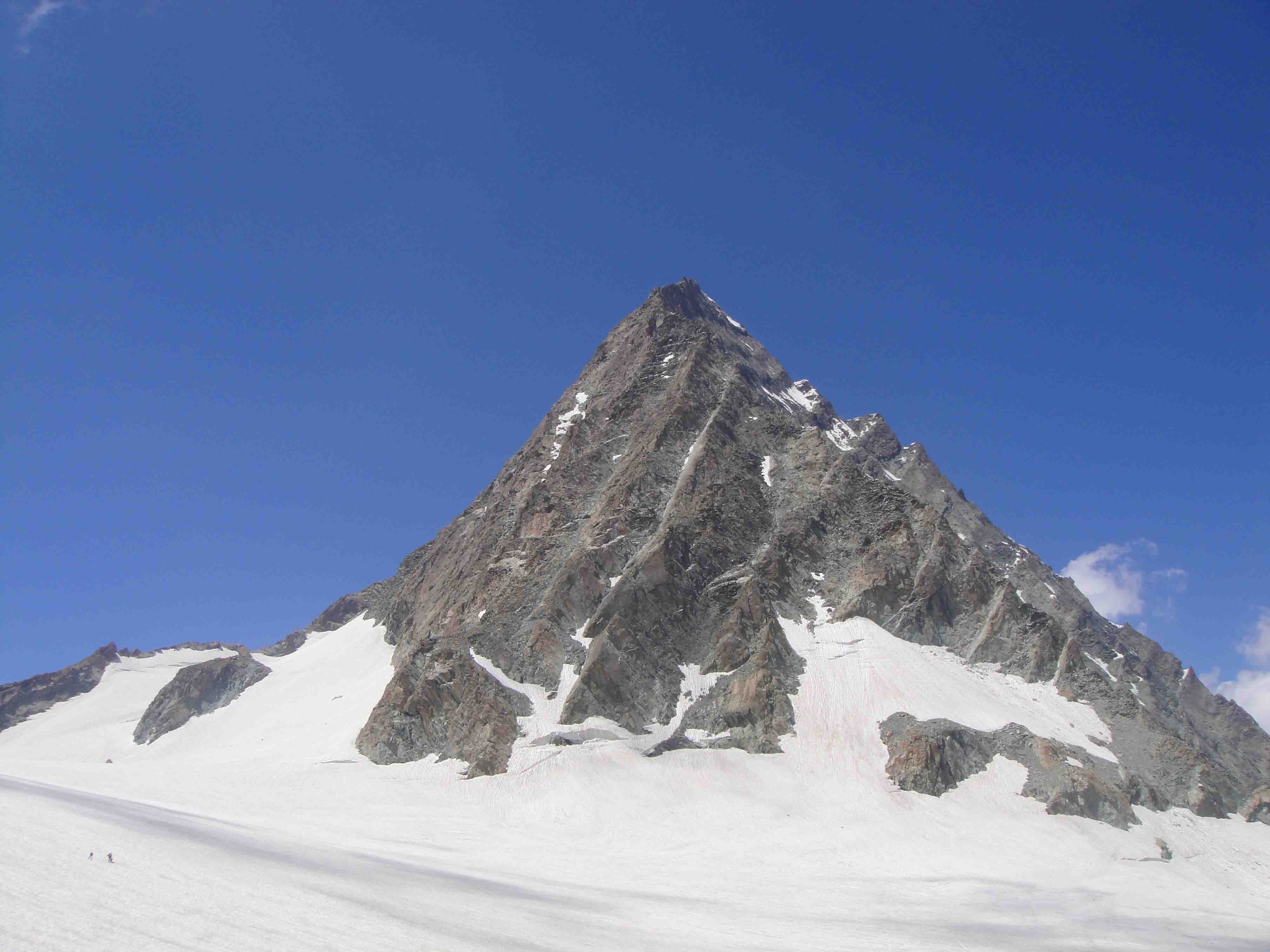
- Kolahoi Peak

Highest point
- Elevation: 5,425 m (17,799 ft)
- Prominence: 1,570 m (5,150 ft)
- Listing: Mountains of India
- Coordinates: 34°9′52″N 75°19′37″E

Geography
- Location within Jammu and Kashmir
- Location: Anantnag Jammu and Kashmir, India
- Parent range: Himalayas

Climbing
- First ascent: 1912 by Dr Ernest Neve, United Kingdom
- Easiest route: Aru Pahalgam

Kolahoi Peak (locally called 'Gashe-braed' meaning Illuminated Cat) is a mountain with peak elevation of 5,425 metres (17,799 ft) located in Lidder Valley, Jammu and Kashmir. Kolahoi Peak is easily accessible through Aru Pahalgam. The mountain is the highest mountain in Kashmir Division. (Note: The Nun Peak which is 23,409 ft (7,135 metres) in height and lies in the Jammu Division is the highest mountain in Jammu and Kashmir.) Kolahoi Peak is part of the Great Himalayan range, and is located 16 km south of Kashmir.

Kolahoi Peak rises from the Kolahoi Glacier is a pyramid-shaped peak with ice falls and ice fields at its bottom. The rock formation of the peak is extraordinary stable with aretes and ridges.

== Climbing history and routes ==
Kolahoi Peak was first climbed by a British medical team headed by Dr Ernest Neve in 1912.

The easiest route to climb Kolahoi Peak is its southern face via the Aru village near Pahalgam, from which a 21 km high altitude alpine trek leads to the glacier of the peak.

On 7 September 2018, a team of mountaineers while descending after successful summit were hit by rockfall debris, which killed two of them.

The first Kolahoi Greater traverse was completed successfully on 11 to 13 September 2023 led by Inayat Ullah Bhat, with Raja Waseem and Laway Mudasir. They traversed a total of 6.21 miles from the Southern glacier to the Northern glacier reaching the summit of Neve-Mason couloir of Kolahoi peak.

== Kolahoi Glacier ==
Kolhai Glacier
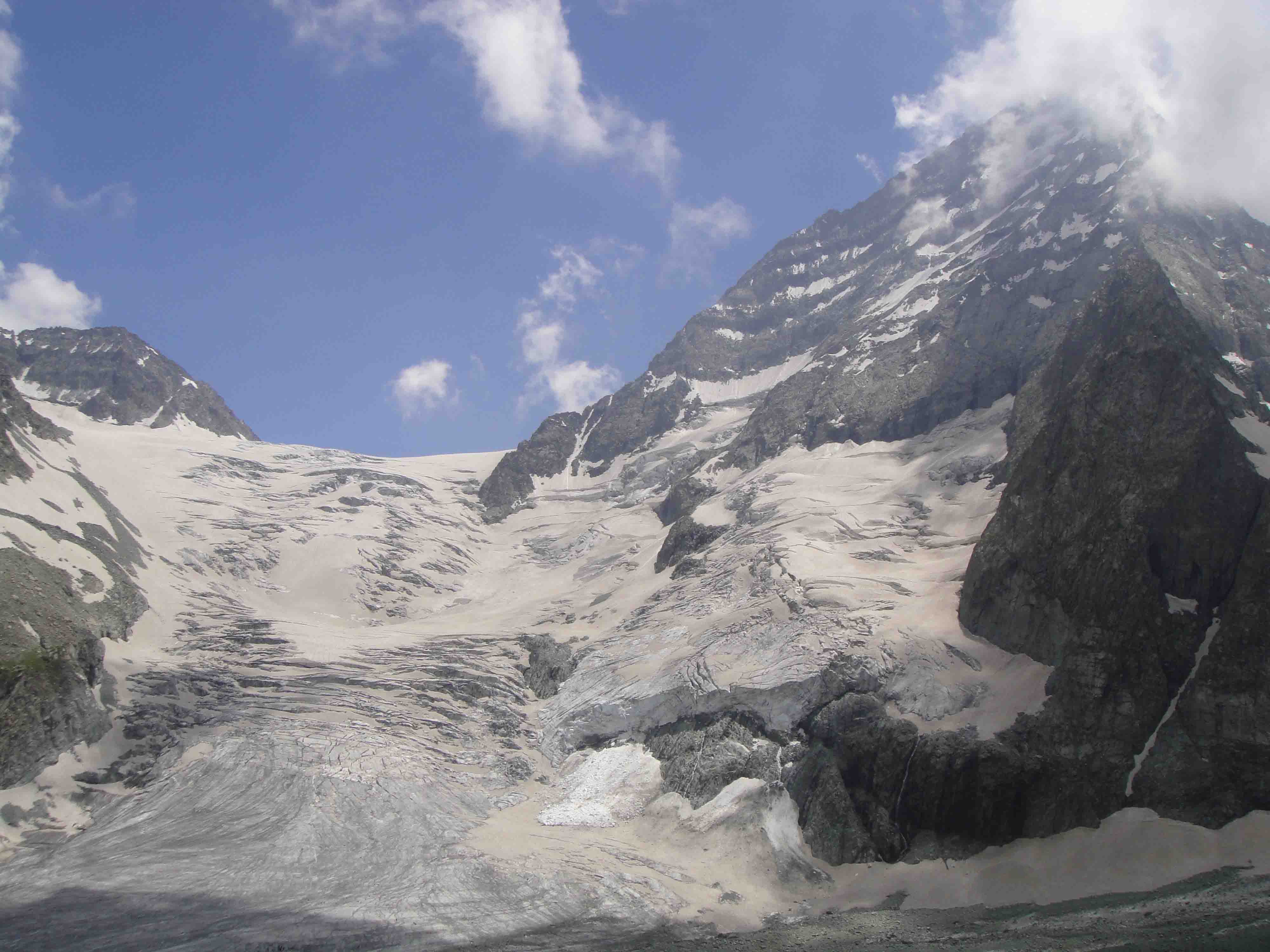
- Kolhai Glacier
- Interactive map of Kolhai Glacier
- Type: Mountain glacier
- Location: Anantnag Jammu and Kashmir, India
- Coordinates: 34°10′20″N 75°20′10″E
- Length: 5 kilometres (3 mi) in 1974

Kolahoi glacier lies at an average elevation of 4,700 metres (15,400 ft). The origin of the glacier is below the cirques on the north flank of Kolahoi Peak. It is the main source of Lidder River, whose water serves the population of Anantnag district, where it is mainly used for drinking and agricultural purposes. It finally drains into the Jhelum River near Khanabal.

Kolahoi Glacier is among the victims of global warming, and has shrunk in area from 13.57 km^{2} in 1963 to 10.69 km^{2} in 2005 or a loss of 2.88 km^{2} in three decades. In 1974 the glacier was about 5 km long and is known to have extended for at least 35 km during the Pleistocene. A detailed analysis by Rafiq and Mishra reported that the glacier has shrunk from 35 to 09.88 Sq Km. The rate of recession measured from 1922 to 2015 is reported to be 73.26 m per year. Furthermore, the rate of recession of snout is found to be 16.41 m per year from 1857 to 2015. The shrinking of the glacier area is linked to reduction in snow depth which in turn is affected by the increase in black carbon concentration, temperature and reduction in precipitation. Reanalysis data show that there is decrease of about 1.08 ± 0.65 cm per decade in snow depth over Kolahoi glacier during 1979 to 2013. There are decadal increasing trends of about 76 nanogram/m^{2} (statistically significant) and 0.39 °C (insignificant) in black carbon concentration and temperature, respectively, over Kolahoi. A decreasing trend of about 2.9 mm/month per decade in precipitation over the study area is also reported. It is reported that there is decrease of about 71 ± 24% in snow depth for each degree increase in temperature over Kolahoi. Reduction in snow depth as a result of increase in black carbon concentration, temperature and reduction in precipitation might have resulted in the shrinking of the Kolahoi glacier. According to another report,

== See also ==
- Anantnag
- Gulmarg
- Pahalgam
- Yusmarg
- Kukernag
- Gangabal
- Aharabal
- Kolahoi Peak
- Hirpora Wildlife Sanctuary
- List of ultras of the Himalayas
