= Lidder River =

River in Indian-administered Jammu and Kashmir, tributary of the Jhelum River

Lidder River (Liddar)
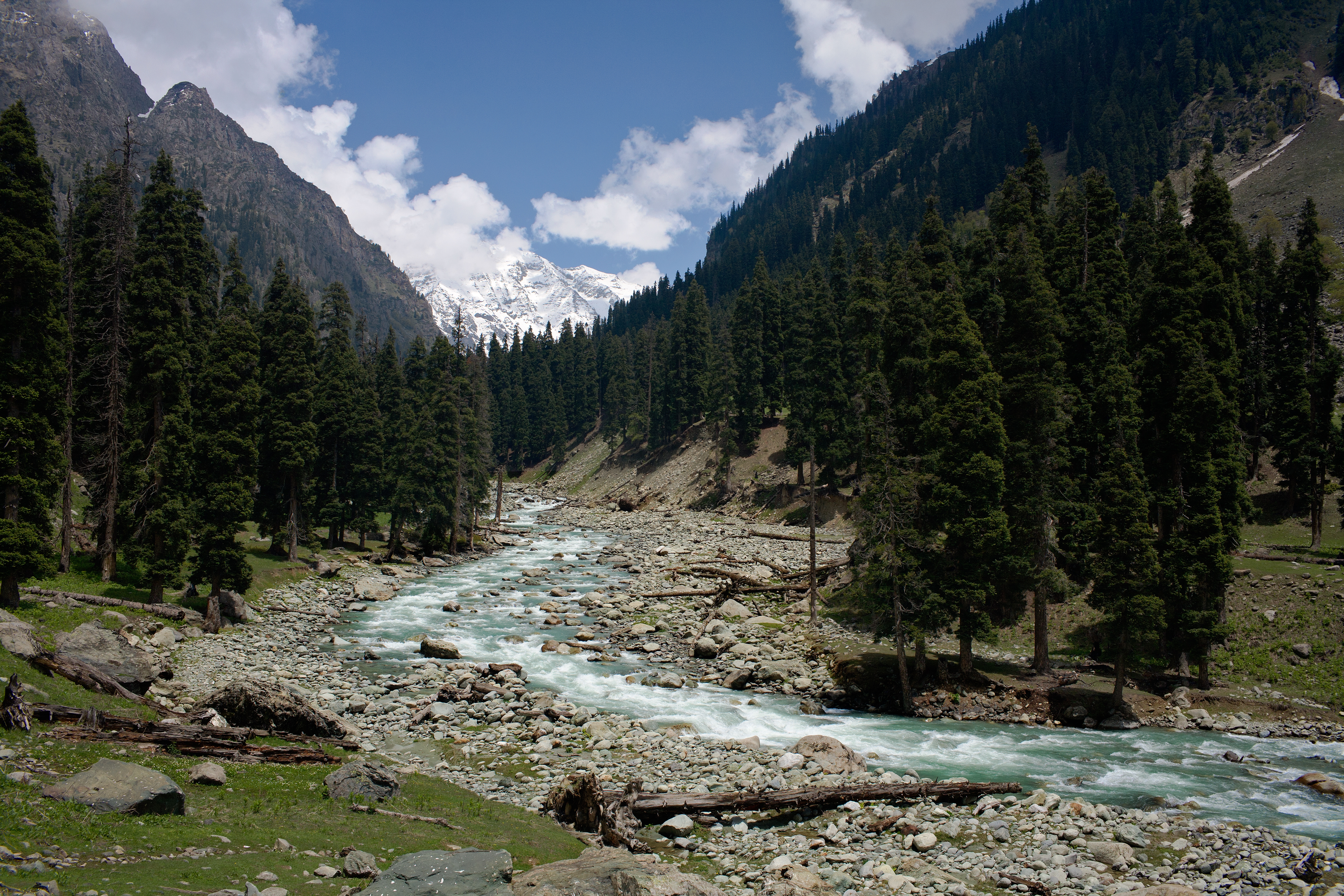
- Lidder River photographed near Lidderwat, Anantnag in 2010

Location
- Country: India
- Union territory: Jammu and Kashmir
- Region: Kashmir Valley
- Districts: Anantnag

Physical characteristics
- Source: 34.158136°N 75.309373°E
  - location: Kolahoi Glacier
  - elevation: 4,653 m (15,266 ft)
- Mouth: 33.752841°N 75.131652°E
  - location: Jhelum River at Mirgund Khanabal
  - elevation: 1,615 m (5,299 ft)
- Length: 73 km (45 mi)
- Discharge
  - average: 206 m^{3}/s (7,300 cu ft/s)

The Lidder or Liddar (IPA: /lʲədɨr/) is a 73 km (45 mi) river situated in the Kashmir Valley of Jammu and Kashmir, India. It originates from the Kolahoi Glacier and feeds the Jhelum River in Mirgund Khanabal, at an altitude of 1,615 metres (5,299 ft).

== Etymology ==
Lidder is a corruption of the local Sanskrit name Lambodari (लम्बोदरी) meaning 'long bellied goddess'.

== Geography ==
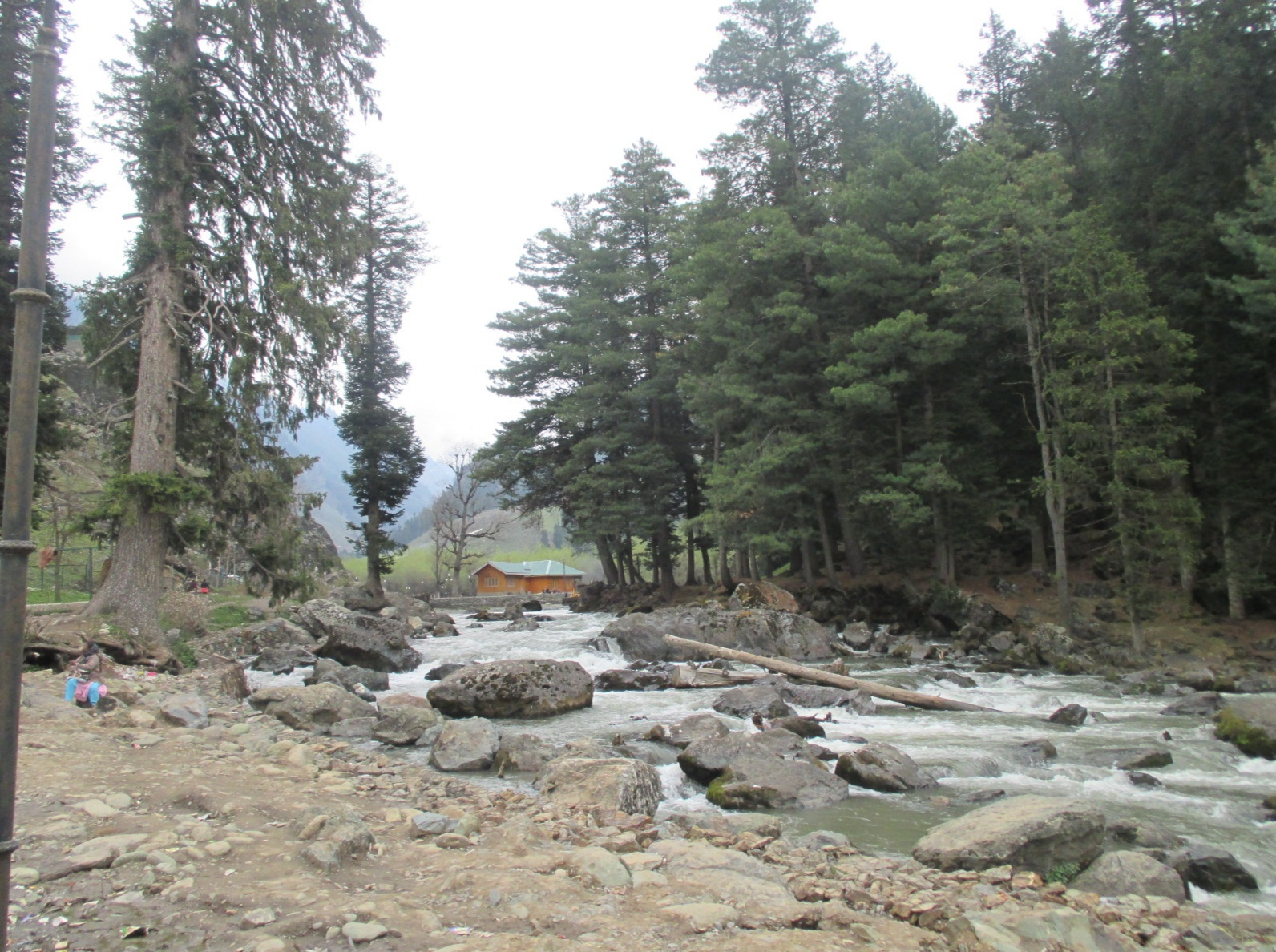
Lidder river near Betaab Valley, in April 2013

The river originates from Kolhoi Glacier near Sonamarg and gives rise to Lidder Valley. It runs southwards through the alpine meadows of Lidderwat in the region of Aru, from which it got its name. It covers 30 kilometres (19 mi) before reaching Pahalgam where it joins the major tributary of the East Lidder from Sheshnag Lake. It then runs westwards until it meets the Jhelum River at Mirgund Khanabal near Anantnag. It has crystal blue-coloured water and Pahalgam is situated in the center of Lidder Valley.

== Economy ==
The waters of the river are mainly used for irrigation purposes through different canals and as drinking water processed by water treatment plants. There are many different varieties of fish present in the river and a fisheries plant has been built on the banks of the river. The major types of fish found in the river are the river trout (Salmo trutta fario) and rainbow trout (Oncorhynchus mykiss).
