= Waqf (Amendment) Act, 2025 =

Indian legislative Act

Parliament of India
- Long title: An Act further to amend the Waqf Act, 1995.
- Territorial extent: Republic of India
- Passed by: Lok Sabha
- Passed: 3 April 2025
- Passed by: Rajya Sabha
- Passed: 4 April 2025
- Assented to by: Droupadi Murmu President of India
- Assented to: 5 April 2025
- Commenced: 8 April 2025

Codification
- Code sections created: 5 July 2025

Legislative history

Initiating chamber: Lok Sabha
- Bill title: Waqf (Amendment) Bill, 2024
- Bill citation: Bill No. 109 of 2024
- Introduced by: Kiren Rijiju (BJP) (Minister of Minority Affairs)
- Introduced: 8 August 2024
- First reading: 9 August 2024
- Considered in committee: 30 January 2025 (Note: Final report recommended by Joint Parliamentary Committee was submitted to the Speaker of Lok Sabha.)
- Second reading: 2 April 2025
- Passed: 3 April 2025
- Voting summary: 288 voted for; 232 voted against; None abstained

Revising chamber: Rajya Sabha
- First reading: 3 April 2025
- Passed: 4 April 2025
- Voting summary: 128 voted for; 95 voted against; None abstained

Amends
- Waqf Act, 1995
- Status: In force

The Waqf (Amendment) Act, 2025 was introduced in the Indian Lok Sabha on 8 August 2024. It seeks to repeal Mussalman Wakf Act, 1923 and amend the Waqf Act, 1995. The Act regulates waqf property in India. The act renames the Act to United Waqf Management, Empowerment, Efficiency and Development Act, 1995 (UWMEED Act 1995).

The amendment incorporates 25 recommendations from the Joint Parliamentary Committee (JPC), aims for the removal of inequality, introduction of gender equality by mandating representation of at least two Muslim women on the Central Waqf Council and State Waqf Boards and ensuring female inheritance rights, and promotion of sectarian inclusivity by requiring representation from various Muslim sects on State Waqf Boards. The act empowers the Central Government to create rules for Waqf registration, auditing, and accounts, ensuring transparency and accountability. An appeal process is also included, allowing 90 days to challenge decisions made by Waqf tribunals before the High Court.

== History ==
=== Inception: Muslim period of rule of India and Waqf ===
The first waqf in the Indian subcontinent was documented in the 12th century when Muhammad Ghori, after his victory over Prithviraj Chauhan, established Muslim period of rule in India and a waqf with two villages through a recorded grant. Under the Delhi Sultanate, Waqf properties expanded, with sultans like Iltutmish, Muhammad bin Tughlaq and Alauddin Khilji establishing and maintaining them. The Mughal Empire furthered Waqf development, with Akbar and Shah Jahan endowing significant properties, including the Taj Mahal. The system's reach extended into rural areas with Muslim community expansion and conversions. Funding for Waqf was generated through the revenue of endowed properties, and were utilised for mosques and madrasas. Waqf system gained a more formal modern legal structure during British rule in the Indian subcontinent under the still applicable Indian laws when Waqf Boards were formed in 1913. Mussalman Waqf act 1923 was established for the purpose of advising it on matters pertaining to the working of the State Waqf Boards and proper administration of the Waqfs in the country. Waqf is a permanent donation of movable or immovable properties for religious purposes without any intention of reclaiming it as recognised by Muslim Law. The grant is known as mushrut-ul-khidmat, while a person making such dedication is known as Wakif.

=== 2025 waqf amendment ===
Reforms in Waqf regulation and legislations has been a big topic in recent decades in Indian politics and media, with the Bharatiya Janata Party making promises of doing it several times in their electoral manifestoes. Controversies, including corruption and land grabbing such as Karnataka Wakf Board Land Scam, issues led to the introduction of "The Waqf (Amendment) Bill, 2024" which was passed in 2025 to introduce transparency and accountability in Waqf. In 2024, the Government of India had introduced the Waqf Amendment Bill proposing over forty changes to the existing legislation. However, the bill has been heavily criticised and opposed by Muslims.

Prior to amendment in 2025, the Waqf Act 1995 was the last act which was regulating waqf properties in India prior to its renaming in 2025, and defines Waqf as an endowment of movable or immovable property for purposes considered pious, religious, or charitable under Muslim law. Every state is required to constitute a Waqf Board to manage waqf. For amending the waqf laws, a 31-member JPC had been established to review the Waqf (Amendment) Bill, 2024. The committee comprised 21 members from the Lok Sabha and 10 from the Rajya Sabha. The formation of the committee was announced by Minister of Minority Affairs Kiren Rijiju on 9 August 2024. Some rounds of the JPC meetings were boycotted by few members from opposition parties. During the consultation process on the Waqf (Amendment) Bill, 2024, several civil society organizations, political representatives, and religious institutions submitted memoranda to the Joint Parliamentary Committee, raising concerns regarding the proposed amendments. Notable submissions were received from the Indian Union Muslim League (Kerala), Dr. Shafiqur Rahman Barq (Member of Parliament, Lok Sabha), Anjuman Waqf Committee (Uttar Pradesh), and the Act Public Welfare Foundation (Serial No. 377, page 863).

== Overview of the 2025 Waqf Act ==
=== Key features of 2025 Waqf Act ===
- Renaming of the Waqf Act, 1995 as the Unified Waqf Management, Empowerment, Efficiency and Development Act, 1995.
- Formation of waqf and eligibility, The Act allows waqf to be formed by (i) declaration, (ii) recognition based on long-term use (waqf by user), or (iii) endowment when the line of succession ends (waqf-alal-aulad). The Bill states that only a person practising Islam for at least five years may declare a waqf. It clarifies that the person must own the property being declared. It removes waqf by user. It also adds that waqf-alal-aulad must not result in denial of inheritance rights to the donor's heir including women heirs.
- Omitting the provisions relating to the “waqf by user”.
- Survey Commissioner Functions: Providing the functions of the Survey Commissioner to the Collector or any other officer not below the rank of Deputy Collector duly nominated by the Collector for the survey of waqf properties.
- Inclusivity and women's empowerment: Providing for a broad-based composition of the world Waqf Council and the State Waqf Boards and ensuring the representation of Muslim women and non-Muslims.
- Separate board for sects to empower diversity of faith: Providing for establishment of separate Board of Auqaf for Boharas and Aghakhanis. Providing for representation of Shia, Sunni, Bohra, Agakhani and other backward classes among Muslim communities.
- Streamlining Registration/Database of waqfs through a central portal and database.
- Legalised mutation process: Providing for a detailed procedure for mutation as per revenue laws with due notice to all concerned before recording any property as waqf property.
- Tribunal Reform and Appeals: Reforming the Tribunal structure with two members and providing for appeals against the orders of the Tribunal to the High Court within a specified period of ninety days.
- Limitation Act: Omission of section 107 so as to make the Limitation Act, 1963 applicable to any action under the Act; and omission of sections 108 and 108A relating to special provision as to evacuee waqf properties and Act to have overriding effect.

=== Policy justifications for 2025 Waqf Act ===
The government while proposing the legislation asserted that The Waqf (Amendment) Bill 2025 established a secular, transparent and accountable system for Waqf administration in India. Although Waqf properties served religious & charitable purposes, their management involved significant legal, financial & administrative responsibilities that necessitated structured governance & oversight. The roles of Waqf Boards and the Central Waqf Council were defined as regulatory rather than religious, focused on ensuring legal compliance & protecting the public interest.

Policymakers argued that existing legal and institutional frameworks had hindered Waqf institutions from effectively serving the welfare needs of underprivileged members of the community. In response, the 2025 amendment aimed to enhance transparency, efficiency and inclusivity while aligning Waqf governance with constitutional values. By introducing checks & balances, empowering stakeholders and improving institutional accountability, the Bill was positioned as a progressive step toward equitable and effective Waqf management in India. The government outlined several policy justifications for these reforms, emphasizing their alignment with broader goals of social justice & constitutional governance.

- Institutional Transparency and Digital Governance: The Act mandates the digitization and centralized registration of all Waqf properties within six months. This initiative aims to rectify historical issues of mismanagement and opacity in Waqf administration. By creating a centralized digital portal, the government seeks to facilitate real-time monitoring, prevent unauthorized transactions and ensure that revenue generated from Waqf properties is used exclusively for community welfare. This reform is expected to curb corruption & financial irregularities, thereby improving overall governance. Provision for surveys and audits is also proposed.
- Legal Clarity and Prevention of Unlawful Claims: The amendment abolishes the 'waqf-by-user' doctrine and prohibits the unilateral declaration of any land including that belonging to government as Waqf property. These provisions are designed said to reduce land disputes that have led to extended litigation across various states. For instance, cases such as the land ownership conflict in Tamil Nadu have drawn national attention. By introducing stricter guidelines and eliminating arbitrary claims, the amendment aims to safeguard property rights & uphold the integrity of Waqf assets.
- Promoting Gender Equality: The Act ensures representation of Muslim women on Waqf boards and protects inheritance rights, aligning with constitutional values of equality and justice. The amendment also prioritizes the welfare of Muslim women, particularly widows and divorced women, by promoting self-help groups and financial independence programs. It ensures representation of women in Waqf Boards and supports initiatives such as scholarships for Muslim girls, vocational training programs and legal aid centers for inheritance disputes & domestic violence cases. By empowering women, the bill seeks to make Waqf governance more inclusive and responsive to community needs.
- Gender Representation and Women's Empowerment: The Act introduces provisions for the representation of Muslim women on Waqf Boards that the government said is in line with constitutional commitments to equality and justice. It also supports welfare measures including scholarships for girls, vocational training, self-help groups, and legal aid services. These initiatives seek to empower Muslim women who are widows and divorcees by enhancing their participation in community governance and promoting financial independence.
- Inclusive Representation and Community Participation: To democratize Waqf administration, this Act mandates representation from diverse Muslim sects including Bohra and Aghakhani communities and members from socially and economically backward classes. Additionally, two non-Muslim professionals with expertise in administration or law are to be included on the State and Central Waqf Boards. This is intended to foster a more inclusive and accountable governance structure.
- Public Health and Medical Welfare Initiatives: The amendment encourages the allocation of Waqf resources towards the establishment and support of healthcare facilities particularly in the underserved regions. By improving the efficiency of property management, this Act enables the redirection of funds toward building health institutions and toward providing subsidized medical aid in areas with limited healthcare infrastructure.
- Educational Upliftment and Skill Development: Recognizing the role of education in socio-economic upliftment, the Act prioritizes the construction & maintenance of educational institutions including schools and madrassas. It also provides for scholarships, financial aid and the development of vocational training centres aimed at equipping youth with employable skills.
- Affordable Housing and Social Welfare Infrastructure: The Act allows Waqf Boards to utilize underused or idle properties for affordable housing initiatives. These include low-cost rental programs, shelters for the homeless & housing projects for the economically weaker sections within the community. This is intended to reduce housing insecurity while ensuring productive use of Waqf assets for the needy.
- Economic Empowerment through Community Development: The amendment encourages programs that promote self-reliance and financial independence through microfinance schemes, small business loans, entrepreneurship & livelihood support initiatives. By leveraging Waqf resources for the community development, the Act supports the broader goal of sustainable economic empowerment.
- Expedited Legal Redress and Judicial Efficiency: This Act confers civil court powers upon Waqf Tribunals and permits appeals to High Courts which establishes a more efficient legal framework for resolving disputes related to Waqf properties. This reform is intended to reduce the existing backlog of litigations.
- Protection and Reclamation of Encroached Waqf Assets: According to data from the Waqf Assets Management System of India (WAMSI), nearly 58898 Waqf properties have been unlawfully occupied. The amendment introduces stricter legal measures for the recovery of encroached lands & empowers district collectors to enforce these provisions. These steps are aimed at restoring Waqf properties for their intended charitable & community-oriented purposes.
- Professionalization and Structural Modernization of Waqf Boards: The inclusion of professionals both Muslim and non-Muslim specialists in law, administration and land management is aimed at modernizing the governance model. The amendment redefines the role of Waqf Boards and the Central Waqf Council as regulatory rather than religious bodies, focusing on legal compliance, transparency & public accountability. The reform also introduces systemic checks and balances to ensure long-term sustainability and relevance of Waqf institutions in a pluralistic democratic framework.

== Issues ==
=== Illegal land grab through waqf scams and controversys ===
Controversies have arisen from unchecked land grab and the rapid growth of Waqf holdings. The government, in justifying the 2025 amendments, cited numerous instances of Waqf Boards making unilateral claims over private and government land, which led to extensive litigation. The following table provides examples of court rulings where Waqf Board claims were rejected or strongly criticized, supporting the need for the legislative changes:

Court rulings against Waqf Board's attempts of land grab
Case name	Court	Ruling against waqf	Comment/Citation
Munambam land dispute (Kerala)	Kerala High Court	Held the 1950 endowment deed was a gift deed, not a waqf deed, lacking "permanent dedication"; declared the 2019 Waqf Board notification a "sham" and "land-grabbing tactic," unenforceable under Waqf Acts 1954, 1984, and 1995.	
Thiruchenthurai village and Sundareswarar Temple (Tamil Nadu)	Madras High Court	Rejected Tamil Nadu Waqf Board's claim over the entire village, including the 1,500-year-old temple, for lack of valid waqf documentation; upheld residents' rights.	
Manikonda Jagir land dispute (Telangana)	Supreme Court of India	Quashed Andhra Pradesh/Telangana Waqf Board's claim over 1,654 acres, ruling the land vested with the state or Telangana State Industrial Infrastructure Corporation, free from encumbrances, due to lack of valid waqf dedication.	
Kanmiya Pallivasal mosque in Tirunelveli (Tamil Nadu)	Madras High Court	Limited mosque's claim to 2.34 acres based on a 1712 grant, rejecting broader claim over 1,100 acres for insufficient evidence of waqf dedication or user.	
Shahdara Gurudwara land grab case (Delhi)	Supreme Court of India	Upheld Delhi High Court's 2010 ruling that a Gurdwara existed since 1947, dismissing Delhi Waqf Board's claim for lack of historical waqf evidence; rejected SLP appeal.	
Bet Dwarka islands encroachments (Gujarat)	Gujarat High Court	Rejected petitions to protect illegal structures claimed as waqf, allowing demolition; dismissed claims as baseless due to absence of valid registration or survey under Waqf Act.	
Suit No. 269/96 (Uttar Pradesh)	Supreme Court of India	Dismissed Uttar Pradesh Waqf Board's appeal, upholding lower courts' rejection; ruled property not waqf due to lack of dedication proof, dismissing SLP (Civil) No. 19125 of 2014.	
Special Civil Application No. 22761 of 2019 (Gujarat)	Gujarat High Court	Rejected mutation claim for purchased land as waqf, dismissing Civil Application No.1 of 2020; upheld Mamlatdar's rejection for non-compliance with survey requirements.	
Sy.No.681 agricultural land (Karnataka)	Karnataka High Court	Upheld Tahsildar's rejection, confirming 1981 Land Tribunal occupancy rights; ruled land not waqf due to absence of historical dedication evidence.	
Sy.No.677 agricultural land (Karnataka)	Karnataka High Court	Rejected claim based on 1981 Land Tribunal order granting occupancy rights; found no evidence of waqf creation or user.	
W.P. No. 13733/2007 land dispute (Karnataka)	Karnataka High Court	Rejected writ petition claiming property under Waqf Act, 1995; dismissed appeal, affirming respondents' occupancy rights for lack of survey and dedication proof.	
Haryana Waqf Board v. Shanti Swaroop (Haryana)	Supreme Court of India	Rejected application under Order XXVI Rule 9 CPC for encroached land; dismissed SLP No. 7510 of 2007 for non-compliance with limitation and evidence requirements.	
Waqf Board claim in Jaipur (Rajasthan)	Rajasthan High Court	Rejected claim over 50 acres for a historical mosque; directed removal of Board's entries from revenue records as land was state property under Rajasthan Land Revenue Act, lacking waqf deed or survey.	

==== Thiruchenthurai and Sundareswarar Temple's land grab scam by waqf ====
Thiruchenthurai village and Sundareswarar Temple's land grab scam by waqf in Tamil Nadu is a systematic large-scale land grab by Tamil Nadu State Waqf Board. This is a case which exemplifies how waqf have been illegally grabbing land, in this case the land of entire predominantly Hindu village of Thiruchenthurai in Tiruchirapalli district, including the 1,500-year-old Sundareswarar Temple claimed by the Tamil Nadu Waqf Board, creating controversy as the waqf properties are irrevocable and immune to sale or transfer under the law, thus giving rise to the demand of amendment of waqf system and laws.

==== Munambam land grabbing scam by Waqf ====
Munambam land grabbing scam by Waqf in Kerala pertains to systematic large-scale illegal land grab in Munambam by Kerala Wakf Board (KWB) in which 404 acres of land of 600 families, mainly Catholic Christians and down trodden Hindus, who have bene living there for several decades. In 2019, Kerala Wakf Board tried to grab this land by declaring it a waqf property.

The dispute arose in 2019 when the Kerala Wakf Board declared the disputed land as a waqf property (an inalienable religious endowment in Islamic law). The land was originally given in 1950 by Mohammed Siddique Sait to the Farook College management through an endowment deed. Over the years, the college sold portions of the land to the residents, who claim to be bona fide purchasers and occupants. The KWB's 2019 declaration, made 69 years after the original deed, put the livelihoods of the resident families at risk, as they were subsequently unable to carry out legal activities such as paying land tax.

In October 2025, the Kerala High Court ruled on the matter, providing significant relief to the resident families. The Division Bench of the High Court held that the 1950 endowment deed was a simple gift deed and not a waqf deed, as it did not create a "permanent dedication" of the property. The court strongly criticised the actions of the Kerala Wakf Board, terming the declaration of the disputed land as a waqf a "complete sham" and a "'land-grabbing tactic'".

The court observed:

- "...we would hold that the declaration by the KWB in May 2019 of the property as a waqf is a complete sham..."
- The court stated that the action of the KWB was "bad in law on the grounds of being unreasonably delayed and having been issued in palpable violation of the provisions of the Waqf Acts 1954, 1984, and 1995 and resultantly non-enforceable."
- The judgment further noted, "We shall be holding that the notification dated 25.09.2019 notifying the subject property as waqf is ultra vires the provisions of The Waqf Act, 1954, as also The Central Waqf Act, 1995 and nothing less than a land grabbing tactics of KWB which has affected the bread and butter, livelihood of hundreds of families and bonafide occupants who had purchased tranches of land decades prior to the notification of the waqf property."
- The bench also noted that the KWB's actions showed "reckless disregard of not only the provisions of the Waqf Act, but also the fundamental rights of a large number of citizens whose livelihood is dependent as bona fide purchasers and occupants on land under dispute."
- The court, however, refrained from formally quashing the KWB's 2019 orders, stating that the purpose of its findings was to hold that the State Government was not bound by such a belated declaration.
- The court further warned that if such an arbitrary declaration were given judicial approval, "tomorrow any random building or structure, including the Taj Mahal, Red Fort, Niyama Sabha Mandiram (State Legislature Complex), or even the High Court building, could be arbitrarily declared waqf property."

=== Belagavi farmers dispute ===
In Karnataka, controversies have emerged when the State Waqf Board issued encroachment notices to farmers in the Gokak region of Belagavi district, accusing them of occupying Waqf property. According to former Minister and BJP leader B. Sriramulu, these notices accused farmers of occupying Waqf property, despite the local community having cultivated the farmlands for generations. Sriramulu noted that this was the second such instance in these three years, prompting that BJP should launch a state-level agitation against these notices. Proponents of the Waqf (Amendment) Act, including Sriramulu, cited these local disputes as such concrete evidences for the necessity of national legislative intervention, arguing that the amendment would permanently end confusion over Waqf land records and to protect the property rights of Hindu landowners from being falsely branded as Waqf assets.

=== Large size of waqf land in India ===
Waqf land in India is large encompassing 870,000 properties worth ₹100,000 crore (US$10 billion) covering a total of 940,000 acres (3,808 sq km) making waqf third-biggest property-holders in India after the Indian Railways and the Indian Armed Forces. The 2006 Sachar Committee found waqf assets were undervalued and mismanaged, estimating 4.9 lakh properties worth Rs 6,000 crore but generating only Rs 163 crore in income. It highlighted issues like poor governance and recommended reforms in management and oversight.

=== Waqf land disputes ===
Out of the 872,852 waqf properties officially recorded across India, over 13,200 are currently involved in legal disputes, nearly 59,000 have been encroached upon, and more than 436,000 lack a clearly defined status. Governments across that country are in dispute with Waqf boards which have asserted ownership on more than 5900 government owned properties nationwide. However, the waqf boards maintains that their ownership is legitimate. A number of ongoing disputes over waqf properties can be traced back to the era of India’s independence & partition. Concerns about waqf properties were raised even during British rule, particularly regarding their management, misuse, and legal ambiguities. Despite repeated efforts by the judiciary and successive governments to bring clarity and resolution, many of these issues remain unresolved.

=== Corruption in Waqf by officials ===
Despite the government's claims, RTI findings by journalist Afroz Alam Sahil revealed serious inconsistencies in the Waqf digitisation process managed through the WAMSI portal. Data for over 435,000 properties was missing, large portions of funds remained underutilised, and no audits had been carried out. Sahil also pointed out discrepancies between official records and ground realities, including mismatched figures on graveyards and other properties, raising significant concerns about transparency, accuracy, and the long-term effectiveness of the digitisation initiative.

=== Criticism of the 2025 Waqf Act ===
Critics, including opposition parties, have raised concerns about the bill's constitutional validity and its potential impact on minority rights. Such concerns include:

- Inclusion of non-Muslim members in Waqf Boards undermines the religious autonomy of these boards and violates constitutional protections for minority institutions.
- The proposed removal of the ‘Waqf by User’ provision arbitrarily excludes potential donors, particularly recent converts who may wish to endow property for religious or charitable purposes.
- The bill empowers district collectors to determine ownership of disputed waqf properties, shifting authority from Waqf boards to government-appointed officials. This raises concerns about potential misuse of power and political interference.
- The bill proposes to repeal Section 107 of the Waqf Act, 1995, thereby making the Limitation Act, 1963 applicable to waqf properties. Critics argue that this move would severely hamper the ability of Waqf Boards to reclaim encroached properties. Without the exemption, individuals who have illegally occupied waqf land for over 12 years could claim ownership through adverse possession, effectively legitimizing illegal encroachments and weakening protections for community-held religious assets.

Some argue that it could lead to government overreach in the management of Waqf properties. The government has defended the bill, stating that it aims to bring transparency and accountability to the management of Waqf properties. Home Minister Amit Shah emphasised that the bill does not encroach upon religious practices but seeks to ensure proper utilisation of these charitable endowments.

Mujib and Hari wrote in The New York Times, that the Waqf Amendment Bill 2024 allows the appointment of non-Muslims to the panels administering Waqf Boards and empowers state officials to adjudicate disputes. The article states that the bill was passed after parliamentary debate, with the government arguing that the changes were necessary to improve efficiency, ensure accountability, and prevent abuse. The report also notes that while the constitution protects the rights of religious groups to manage their own affairs, critics argue that the bill could provide a legal basis for targeting the Muslim community. It includes the view of Imran Pratapgarhi, a Member of Parliament from the Indian National Congress, who expressed concern over the bill’s potential impact on Muslim religious properties.

Neyaz Farooquee wrote in BBC that the Waqf Amendment Act 2025 has removed the provision of "waqf by user", which previously allowed properties to be recognised as waqf if they had been used for religious or charitable purposes by Muslims over time. According to the article, this has raised concerns among critics that many such properties—often orally donated and without written deeds—may no longer be classified as waqf. The law has led to protests, and several petitions have been filed in the Supreme Court challenging its provisions. Critics argue that the changes could lead to the loss of existing waqf properties and increase litigation.

According to Foreign Policy The amendment has sparked protests, arrests, and fear among Muslims, who see it as part of a broader agenda to erode their rights and status. With over 870,000 waqf properties at stake, critics argue the law threatens secularism and deepens communal divides in India.

== Comparison of Waqf in India with waqf in other countries ==
The comparison between the Waqf system in India and in Muslim-majority countries reveals a stark difference in the degree of autonomy and statutory power granted to the governing bodies. While in Muslim majority countries maintain Waqf institutions, these are predominantly kept under strict state control, which contrasts sharply with the parallel independent legal system created by the Waqf Amendment Act (1995) in India.

=== Summary comparison of waqf reform laws in India with Muslim majority countries ===
Comparison of Waqf Reform Laws: India vs. Islamic Countries
Country/Region	Historical Waqf Administration Issue	Reforms	Present status
Islamic Countries (Syria, Egypt, Turkey)	Suffered from weak administration	At times absorbed into the state sector (e.g., Turkey's early republican era nationalizations)	Maintained the waqf under state control
India (Pre-2025-amendment Waqf Act)	Not specified	Uniquely insulated and protected waqf boards from state control/nationalization.	India after 2025-Waqf Amendment Reforms still grantes enduring and independent powers that exceeded Islamic countries' state-controlled waqf reform models.

=== Other countries which have abolished or weakened waqf ===
Comparative status and autonomy of waqf systems
Country/Region	Status of Traditional Waqf System	Reform/Absorption	Current status / citations
Tunisia	Abolished	Abolished entirely; currently does not have a waqf system.	N/A (System abolished)
Other Muslim Majority Countries (e.g., Libya, Sudan, Syria)	Weakened/Nationalized	Subjected to comprehensive nationalization and state control in the post-colonial era, often to modernize economies and integrate assets into the public domain.	Management structures were centralized and government-controlled.
India (Waqf Boards Pre-2025 Amendment)	Maintained/Autonomous	Maintained a system with a separate legal framework, dedicated tribunals, and significant self-governance.	Before 2025 Waqf amendment, India granted a disproportionately higher degree of religious and legal autonomy than the management structures found in these Muslim majority countries. 2025 Waqf amendment of India attempt to fix the corruption, transparency and misuse of powers by waqf.

=== Detailed comparison with Muslim majority countries' existing waqf ===
Comparing existing waqf management system of Islamic majority countries with Indian waqf
Country	Model of waqf management	Key feature of waqf system	Indian Waqf Boards (Pre-2025 Amendment)
Brunei	Centralized state administration via e-governance platforms.	Increased transparency, streamlined services, and public access to records; sultanate-level centralization and real-time state monitoring.	Stark contrast: Decentralized, minimally audited powers; could declare properties without digital verification or public access mandates.
Egypt	Ministry of Awqaf maintains full governmental authority.	Subsumes endowments into state budgets with rigorous oversight and tightly controlled registration/management.	Disproportionate latitude to claim properties retrospectively, a provision not replicated in Egypt's tightly controlled system; wielded immense legal and financial power with minimal direct bureaucratic interference.
Indonesia	Autonomous national waqf board under the Ministry of Religious Affairs.	Focus on productive waqf assets (hospitals, real estate); operates with mandatory annual audits and limited declarative powers.	Provided broader, unchecked authority to expand waqf holdings, distinguishing it from Indonesia's balanced oversight.
Iran	Supervised by the Organization for Endowments and Charitable Institutions under strict guidelines.	Properties permitted only if they generate sustainable financial returns without diminishing capital; emphasis on sustainability over expansion.	Could perpetually claim and hold properties without equivalent financial viability checks, affording disproportionate permanence and control.
Iraq, Jordan, Lebanon, and Syria	Integrated under religious affairs ministries or councils.	Mandatory state audits and no independent declaration powers.	Waqf Boards uniquely empowered to override civil land records, fostering disputes that highlight the comparative excess and potential for misuse/abuse of autonomy.
Kuwait and Singapore	Mandates state oversight and corporate governance standards.	Integration with national development plans (Kuwait); modern waqf management techniques.	Lacked such mandatory alignments, holding expansive declarative powers that exceeded these countries' regulated models.
Libya and Sudan	Administered through centralized government departments under direct executive control.	Limited autonomy for independent boards; ministerial structures.	Granted State Waqf Boards quasi-judicial powers to adjudicate disputes without appeal to higher civil courts, a level of independence absent in these nations.
Malaysia	Waqf must be officially registered under civil laws enacted in 1956.	Focus on religious, educational, and social welfare; federal Sharia courts with appellate mechanisms exercise greater control.	Contrasting India's non-appealable tribunal decisions and broad property claims, which granted Waqf Boards greater unilateral authority.
Turkey	Managed by the state's Directorate General of Foundations; direct government oversight.	State has historically centralized/nationalized properties; subject to ministerial approval and judicial review.	Enjoyed significant autonomy, including unilateral power to declare property as waqf without mandatory government verification; functioned as quasi-autonomous statutory bodies with self-adjudication power.

== Judicial aftermath ==
=== Plethora of appeals filed ===
Congress MP Mohammad Jawed and AIMIM chief Asaduddin Owaisi separately challenged the Waqf (Amendment) Act, 2025 in the Supreme Court of India on April 4, 2025. The Communist Party of India (CPI) also filed a petition contesting the constitutional validity of the Act.

Subsequently, multiple other petitions were filed by the All India Muslim Personal Law Board, Jamiat Ulama-e-Hind, DMK, and several other Members of Parliament and religious organizations. On April 17, 2025, the Supreme Court clubbed all these petitions under the title “In re: Waqf (Amendment) Act 2025” and directed the Central government to file a consolidated reply within one week. The court also ordered that no waqf property—whether registered, unregistered, or waqf by user—be denotified, altered, or interfered with until the next hearing.

During the Supreme Court hearing on the Waqf (Amendment) Act, 2025, Solicitor General Tushar Mehta, representing the central government, assured the court that no waqf property would be denotified and no appointments would be made to the Central Waqf Council or State Waqf Boards until 5 May. He argued that interim relief should not be granted without hearing the government's position on a law passed by Parliament. The court recorded the assurance and granted the government one week to file its response.

=== Current status of court appeals ===
On April 28, 2025, the Supreme Court declined to entertain a fresh plea filed by petitioner Syed Alo Akbar challenging the Waqf (Amendment) Act, 2025. The bench, comprising Chief Justice Sanjiv Khanna and Justice Sanjay Kumar, reiterated its earlier directive of April 17 that only five consolidated petitions would be heard under the case titled “In Re: Waqf (Amendment) Act, 2025”. The Court asked the petitioner to file an intervention application in those pending cases instead. The Court also appointed three nodal counsels to coordinate arguments and directed them to determine among themselves who would represent the consolidated petitions during the hearing on May 5. The petitioners were permitted to file rejoinders to the Centre’s affidavit—which spans over 1,300 pages—within five days of its service.

On 21 April 2025, the Central Government informed the Supreme Court that it was temporarily holding in abeyance the very provisions of the Waqf Act that it had previously defended in Parliament until the matter is decided by the court, including the clause related to ‘Waqf-by-user’ properties and the appointment of non-Muslims to Waqf Boards. This assurance came during hearings on petitions challenging the constitutional validity of the Waqf (Amendment) Act.

== Reactions ==
=== Protests and violence by Muslim groups ===
Several protests occurred across India when the bill was amended into an act. Violent protests also erupted in places such as West Bengal's Murshidabad and Tripura's Unakoti. In Murshidabad, the protests resulted in multiple casualties and arrests, prompting the Calcutta High Court to order the deployment of the Border Security Force. Officials stated the paramilitary presence was to assist local police in restoring law and order.

Many Muslim organisations, including the All India Muslim Personal Law Board (AIMPLB), staged demonstrations in Delhi, Kolkata and other cities, calling the bill discriminatory and unconstitutional. Critics, including the AIMPLB, several Muslim bodies, and opposition parties such as the Indian National Congress, alleged that the law was aimed at undermining Muslim religious endowments and enabling state interference in waqf properties. They viewed the law as discriminatory towards Muslims, while the government maintained that the reforms aimed to ensure transparency in waqf property management.

On 16 April 2025, the Indian Union Muslim League (IUML) held a large-scale protest at Kozhikode Beach in Kerala in opposition to the Act. On 19 April, members of the local Muslim community in Phagwara, Punjab, led by Sarwar Ghulam Shaba of the Rahstriya Alpsankhyak Arakshan Morcha (Punjab unit), held a protest march against the Waqf (Amendment) Act, 2025. The protesters alleged that the Act was unconstitutional and aimed at government takeover of Waqf properties across the country. An effigy of the Central Government was burnt, and a memorandum was submitted to the BDPO addressed to the President of India, demanding repeal of the Act.

On 19 April 2025, hundreds of Muslims in Cuttack, Odisha, held a protest march against the amended Waqf law. Wearing black bands, they marched from Gandhi Bhawan to the District Collectorate and submitted a memorandum addressed to the President of India and the Chief Justice of India. Organizations such as the State Minority Council, Jamaat-e-Islami Hind (Cuttack unit), Muslim Youth Association, Imarat-e-Shariah, and some secular groups participated. The protesters stated that the amended law infringes upon the constitutional and religious rights of Muslims and demanded its withdrawal.

On 19 April 2025, the All India Muslim Personal Law Board (AIMPLB), with support from the All India Majlis-e-Ittehadul Muslimeen (AIMIM), organized a massive public protest in Hyderabad against the Waqf (Amendment) Act, 2025. The gathering, titled "Save Waqf, Save Constitution", took place at Darussalam, the AIMIM headquarters, and was attended by thousands, including representatives from several political parties such as the Congress, Bharat Rashtra Samithi, YSR Congress Party, and Dravida Munnetra Kazhagam. AIMIM president Asaduddin Owaisi condemned the Act for being discriminatory and unconstitutional, particularly criticizing the clause requiring individuals to be practicing Muslims for at least five years before they can create a waqf. The protest included announcements of further public actions, such as a lights-out protest on 30 April, city-level roundtables on 18 May, a women’s gathering on 22 May, a human chain demonstration across Hyderabad on 25 May, and a sit-in protest on 1 June. Meanwhile, the Supreme Court of India has deferred its interim ruling on petitions against the Waqf Act to 5 May 2025.

On 22 April 2025, a terrorist attack in the Baisaran meadows near Pahalgam in Jammu and Kashmir resulted in the deaths of 26 civilians, including two foreign nationals, and left several others injured. The Resistance Front (TRF), affiliated with the banned Lashkar-e-Taiba group, claimed responsibility. Prominent Muslim organisations strongly condemned the attack, calling it inhuman and incompatible with Islamic principles. The All India Muslim Personal Law Board (AIMPLB) issued a statement of condolence and announced a three-day suspension of its ongoing protests against the Waqf (Amendment) Act as a gesture of solidarity with the victims’ families.

=== Other reactions in India against the new amended Act ===
On 23 March 2025, many Muslim leaders boycotted the Iftar hosted by Bihar Chief Minister Nitish Kumar in protest against his support for the Waqf Bill, following an earlier announcement by the Imarat-e-Shariah and six other organisations. However, despite the call for a boycott, several Muslim leaders, including some members of the Imarat-e-Shariah, attended the event.

On 27 March 2025, the All India Muslim Personal Law Board (AIMPLB) launched a nationwide protest against the Waqf (Amendment) Bill, calling it "unconstitutional and undemocratic". The Board stated that the Bill undermines minority rights and announced a series of protests across Indian cities, including Patna, Vijayawada, Hyderabad, and Mumbai.

On 17 April 2025, Mirwaiz Umar Farooq, chairman of the All Parties Hurriyat Conference and chief cleric of Srinagar's Jama Masjid, criticised the Waqf (Amendment) Act, calling it an "assault on the Muslim identity". He expressed hope that the Supreme Court would uphold constitutional and religious rights and strike down the law. The Mirwaiz also stated that despite restrictions on meetings of the Muttahida Majlis-e-Ulama (MMU), a joint resolution had been passed to support the All India Muslim Personal Law Board’s stance against the Bill.

=== Other reactions in India in favor of the new amended Act ===
On 31 March 2025, the Catholic Bishops' Conference of India (CBCI), in support of the Waqf (Amendment) Bill, released a statement that certain provisions in the existing Central Waqf Act were inconsistent with the Constitution and the secular democratic values of the country. "In Kerala, the Waqf Board has invoked these provisions to declare the ancestral residential properties of more than 600 families in the Munambam region as Waqf land. Over the past three years, this issue has escalated into a complex legal dispute. The fact remains that only a legal amendment can provide a permanent solution, and this must be recognised by the people’s representatives," noted the CBCI, asking the political parties and legislators to adopt an unbiased and constructive approach to this issue.

On 17 April 2025, a Dawoodi Bohra community delegation expressed gratitude to Prime Minister Narendra Modi for the passage of the Waqf (Amendment) Act, fulfilling a long-standing demand. However, The Waqf Amendment Bill has sparked intense opposition from the All India Shia Personal Law Board calling it as "Not right".

=== Reactions in Bangladesh ===
On 12 April 2025, the March for Gaza, held in the capital of Bangladesh, characterized it as part of a broader pattern of Muslim displacement in India. Participants called on the Organisation of Islamic Cooperation (OIC) and other countries to issue strong protests and give a coordinated diplomatical response.

== See also ==
- Central Waqf Council
- Custodian for Enemy Property for India
- Enemy Property Act, 1968
- Privy Purse in India
- Forest Rights Act (India)
- Politics of India
- Transfer of Property Act 1882
- Real Estate (Regulation and Development) Act, 2016
