= In re: Waqf (Amendment) Act 2025 =

Act of the Parliament of India

- Court: Supreme Court of India
- Full case name: In re: Waqf (Amendment) Act, 2025; Asaduddin Owaisi v. Union of India
- Started: 16 April 2025
- Docket nos.: W.P. (C) No. 269/2025
- Citation: 2025 INSC 1116

Holding
- Partial stay of the Act

Court membership
- Judges sitting: B. R. Gavai; Augustine George Masih

Keywords
- Waqf Act, constitutional law, freedom of religion, Article 25, Article 26

In re: Waqf (Amendment) Act 2025 (2025 INSC 1116), is a collection of petitions heard by the Supreme Court of India considering the constitutional validity of the Waqf (Amendment) Act, 2025. Waqf is an inalienable charitable endowment in Islamic law, which is administered in India through a legal framework established in The Waqf Act of 1995 and its 2013 amendments. On August 5, 2025, the Government of India introduced a bill to repeal Mussalman Wakf Act, 1923 and amend the Waqf Act, 1995 as a reform aimed at improving "the efficiency of the administration and management of Waqf properties." However, the bill was criticised for significantly expanding the government's involvement and mandating inclusion of non-muslim members on the Waqf board.

The act was challenged in the Supreme Court of India, with over 65 petitions filed by politicians, religious organisations, civil organisations and advocates. The petitioners include Congress MP Mohammad Jawed and AIMIM chief Asaduddin Owaisi, All India Muslim Personal Law Board, Jamiat Ulama-e-Hind, DMK, and several other Members of Parliament and religious organizations. In its interim judgement on September 15, 2025, the Court stayed parts of the Act without voiding the whole Act.

== Proceedings ==
On April 17, 2025, the Supreme Court clubbed all petitions under the title "In re: Waqf (Amendment) Act 2025" and directed the Union government to file a consolidated reply within one week. It designated five petitions Arshad Madani v. Union of India, Muhammad Jameel Merchant v. Union of India, Mohammed Fazlurrahim & Anr. v. Union of India & Ors., Sheikh Noorul Hassan v. The Union of India & Ors., and Asaduddin Owaisi v. Union of India as the lead cases and treating remaining writ petitions as intervention/impleadment applications.

The court also ordered that no waqf property—whether registered, unregistered, or waqf by user—be denotified, altered, or interfered with until the next hearing.

On April 28, 2025, the Supreme Court declined to entertain a fresh plea filed by petitioner Syed Alo Akbar challenging the Waqf (Amendment) Act, 2025. The bench, comprising Chief Justice Sanjiv Khanna and Justice Sanjay Kumar, reiterated its earlier directive of April 17 that only five consolidated petitions would be heard under the case titled "In Re: Waqf (Amendment) Act, 2025". The Court asked the petitioner to file an intervention application in those pending cases instead.

During the Supreme Court hearing on the Waqf (Amendment) Act, 2025, Solicitor General Tushar Mehta, representing the central government, assured the court that no waqf property would be denotified and no appointments would be made to the Central Waqf Council or State Waqf Boards until 5 May. He argued that interim relief should not be granted without hearing the government's position on a law passed by Parliament. The court recorded the assurance and granted the government one week to file its response.

The Court also appointed three nodal counsels to coordinate arguments and directed them to determine among themselves who would represent the consolidated petitions during the hearing on May 5. The petitioners were permitted to file rejoinders to the Centre's affidavit—which spans over 1,300 pages—within five days of its service.

On 15 May, a Bench of CJI Gavai and Justice A. G. Masih heard the matter for the first time.

== Judgement ==
The two judge bench of the court delivered its interim judgement on September 15, 2025, granting limited stay to key provisions and declining to stay the whole Act. Specifically, Section 3(r) which required that the waqif (person creating the waqf) to prove they have been practising Islam for at least five years, and parts of Section 3C, which deals with government property "identified or declared" as Waqf. The Court also directed that the Central and State Waqf Councils have no more than four and three non-Muslim members, respectively, and that Waqf Boards should aim to have a Muslim ex-officio chairperson.

== See also ==
- Waqf (Amendment) Act, 2025
- Freedom of religion in India
