= Enemy Property Act =

Enemy Property Act may refer to:

- Enemy Property Act, 1968 of India
- Vested Property Act (Bangladesh)
