= Inter vivos transfer =

Gift made during the giver's lifetime

Inter vivos transfer (from Latin inter vivos, "between the living") is a gift of money or property made by one living person to another, as opposed to a testamentary transfer, which takes effect only on the giver's death. The concept exists across the world's legal systems, but the formalities that make such a gift valid, and how far it can later be revoked, differ considerably among the common-law, civil-law, Islamic, and Chinese legal traditions.

Inter vivos gifts are widely used in estate planning to reduce the tax charged on an estate, though their tax treatment varies from country to country. Gifts from parents to adult children are also a major channel of intergenerational wealth transfer, and are studied in the economics of the family for what they reveal about family motives and wealth inequality.

== General features ==
An inter vivos transfer, or lifetime gift, is a gratuitous transfer of property from a living donor to a donee, distinguished from a sale, which is made for consideration, and from a testamentary gift, which takes effect only at the donor's death. A gift generally requires the donee's acceptance and, once complete, cannot ordinarily be revoked, although the formalities needed to complete it, and the point at which it becomes irrevocable, vary between legal systems.

== Formation by legal tradition ==
The rules for making a valid gift depend on the legal tradition in force: common law in the United States, the United Kingdom, and much of the Commonwealth; civil law across continental Europe, Latin America, and the US state of Louisiana; Islamic and Hindu personal law in parts of the Muslim world and in India; and China under its Civil Code.

=== Common law ===
At common law a valid gift requires donative intent, delivery of the property (actual, constructive, or symbolic), and acceptance by the donee. A gift causa mortis, or deathbed gift, is an exception: made in expectation of death, it remains revocable until the donor dies and is limited to personal property.

=== Civil law ===
In civil law systems a gift generally must be made in a formal act before a notary, a requirement descending from Roman law. Under the Louisiana Civil Code, for example, a donation inter vivos must be made by authentic act before a notary on penalty of nullity, though a manual gift of a movable may pass by delivery alone.

=== Islamic law ===
In Islamic law a lifetime gift is a hiba, an immediate and unconditional transfer of ownership of existing property made without consideration, valid on a declaration by the donor, acceptance by the donee, and delivery of possession. A hiba may be revoked before possession passes but generally not after. Whether a parent may use hiba to favour some children over others is debated, with many jurists holding that gifts to children should be made fairly.

=== Hindu law ===
In India, gifts by Hindus are governed by the Transfer of Property Act 1882 rather than by a separate religious law. Under the Act, a gift is a voluntary transfer of existing property without consideration, accepted during the donor's lifetime. A gift of immovable property must be made by a registered instrument attested by two witnesses, and one of movable property by such an instrument or by delivery.

=== Chinese law ===
Under the Civil Code of the People's Republic of China (2020) an inter vivos gift is a gift contract, by which a donor transfers property to a donee without consideration. The donor may revoke it before the property's rights pass to the donee, unless the contract is notarized or serves a public or moral purpose such as disaster relief. After transfer, revocation is limited to statutory cases, such as serious harm to the donor by the donee.

== Taxation ==
The tax treatment of a lifetime gift varies considerably from one country to another.

=== United States ===
In the United States a lifetime gift reduces the estate tax, because gifted property and its later appreciation leave the taxable estate. The gift tax, reenacted in 1932, has since 1976 been unified with the estate tax, and lifetime gifts are added back to it. A per-donee annual exclusion and transfers between spouses are exempt, while gifts that skip a generation face a generation-skipping transfer tax. A gift may be made outright or through an inter vivos trust, as distinct from a testamentary trust made by will, but the donor must surrender control for the property to leave the estate.

=== United Kingdom, Canada and Australia ===
In the United Kingdom, a gift is a "potentially exempt transfer" that escapes inheritance tax if the donor survives seven years, but falls back into the estate if not, the seven-year rule. Neither Canada nor Australia levies a gift tax. Each instead taxes the capital gain when an appreciated asset is given away, treating it as a disposal at fair market value. Australia abolished its own death duties in 1979.

== Economic research ==
In the economics of the family, studied mostly with United States data, inter vivos transfers are thought to make up at least a third of intergenerational transfers, though only about a fifth of households ever receive one. Such gifts often help a recipient buy a home, clear debt, or fund education, and in the United Kingdom parental housing help is nicknamed the "Bank of Mum and Dad". Unlike bequests, which are usually divided equally among children, inter vivos transfers are frequently unequal.

Whether they arise from altruism (giving more to poorer children) or exchange (payment for a child's care) is debated. Empirical work tends to favour exchange, though Stark and Zhang argued that equally altruistic parents may rationally give more to a higher-earning child. Inter vivos gifts are also studied as a factor in wealth inequality.

== See also ==
- Gift (law)
- Inheritance
