= 2025 Pahalgam attack =

Islamist terrorist attack in Indian-administered Kashmir

- Part of the Insurgency in Jammu and Kashmir
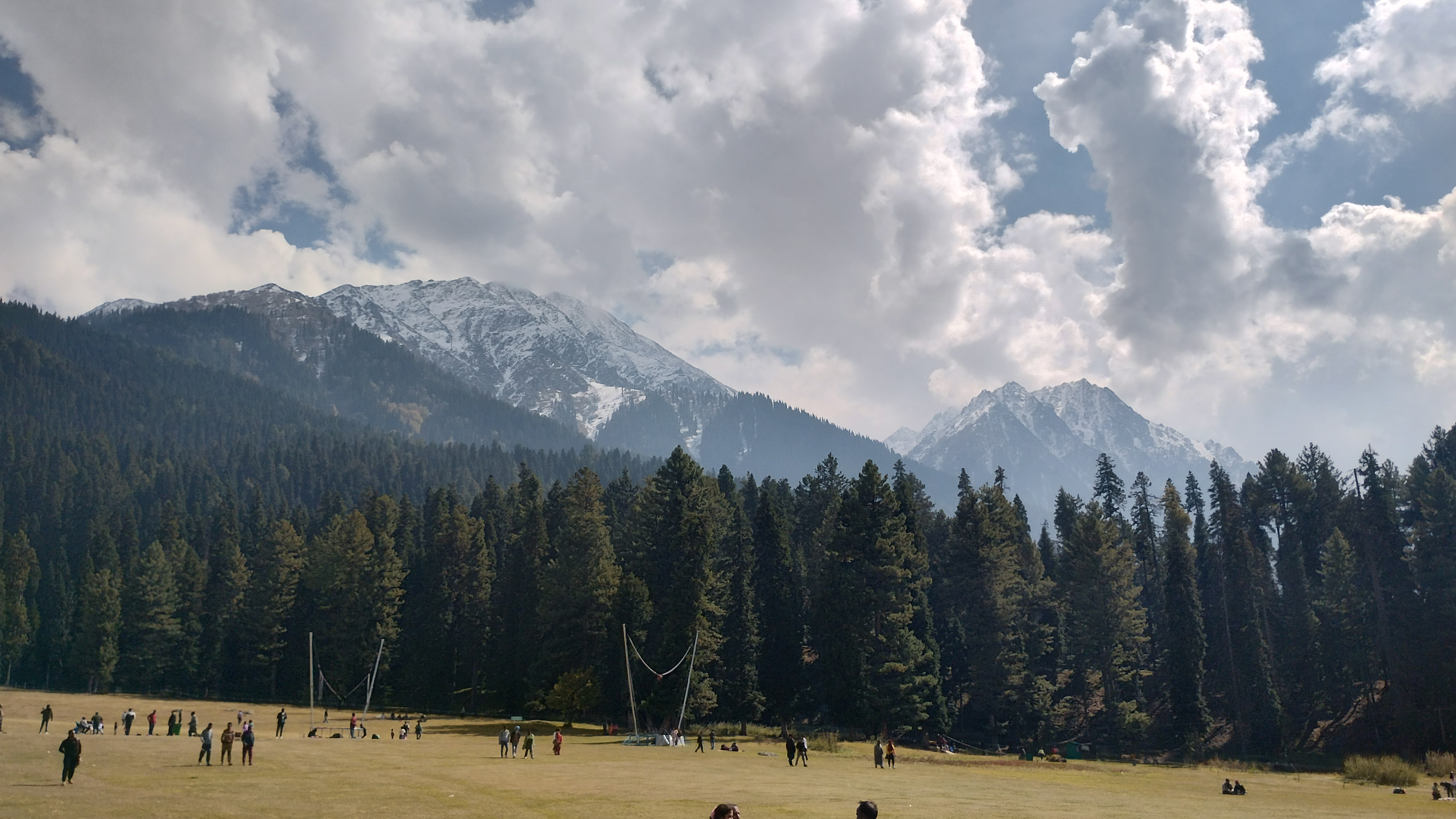
- View of the valley where the attack occurred

- Pahalgam (Jammu and Kashmir) Pahalgam (India) Location of the attack in Jammu and Kashmir
- Location: 34°00′13″N 75°20′01″E; Baisaran Valley, Pahalgam, Jammu and Kashmir, India
- Date: 22 April 2025; 13:00 – 14:45 (UTC+5:30)
- Target: Hindus, Tourists
- Attack type: Mass shooting Mass murder
- Weapons: AK-47s, M4 carbines
- Deaths: 26
- Injuries: 20
- Victim: See casualties
- Perpetrators: Lashkar-e-Taiba; The Resistance Front
- Assailants: Bilal Afzal (Suleiman Shah, Abu Hudun, Faizal Jatt); Habib Nazeer (Hamza Afghani); Hanan Zafar (Jibran)
- Motive: Islamic extremism Hinduphobia

The 2025 Pahalgam attack, also referred to as the 2025 Pahalgam massacre, was an Islamist terrorist attack on tourists by three armed militants near Pahalgam in Indian-administered Jammu and Kashmir in which 26 civilians were killed on 22 April 2025. The attackers targeted Hindu tourists, though a Christian tourist and a local Muslim pony ride operator were also killed. The attackers, armed with M4 carbines and AK-47s, entered the Baisaran Valley, a popular tourist spot, through the surrounding forests. This incident is considered the deadliest attack on civilians in India since the 2008 Mumbai attacks. Scholars and analysts contend that the specific targeting of Hindus, the high civilian casualty of the massacre and its barbarity was aimed at exploiting 'communal fault lines' and elicit a reaction from the Indian government, compelling the government to respond militarily.

The Resistance Front (TRF), a proxy of the Pakistan-based Islamist UN-designated terrorist group Lashkar-e-Taiba (LeT), with a history of attacks on religious minorities, initially claimed responsibility for the attack. It did so twice, on both the day of the attack and the next day. TRF released a statement that the attack was in opposition to non-local settlement in the region resulting from the abolition of the special status of Kashmir. After a few days, TRF denied its involvement in the attack.

The militants singled out the men and asked for their religion before shooting the Hindu and Christian tourists. The attackers also asked some tourists to recite the Islamic kalima, a Muslim declaration of faith, to identify non-Muslims. Of the 26 people killed, 25 were tourists, and one was a local Muslim pony ride operator who tried to wrestle a gun from the attackers. The tourists included several newlywed couples, and the men were shot point-blank in front of their wives.

The attack intensified tensions between India and Pakistan as India accused Pakistan of supporting cross-border terrorism and suspended the Indus Waters Treaty, expelled Pakistani diplomats and closed borders. Pakistan rejected these claims and retaliated by suspending the Simla Agreement, restricting trade, and closing airspace. A standoff between both countries led to a military conflict on 7 May 2025 when India launched airstrikes targeting alleged terror camps in Pakistan. India and Pakistan announced a ceasefire on 10 May 2025.

A manhunt was begun immediately after the attack to find the perpetrators. Having located them, an "Operation Mahadev" was launched in July 2025, in which the three militants were killed. The exact number of perpetrators has never been ascertained. The National Investigation Agency has filed a 1,500-page chargesheet detailing the results of its investigation, which links the dead militants to the attack.

== Background ==
The Jammu and Kashmir insurgency began in the late 1980s, as part of the wider Kashmir conflict. Pakistan's role in launching the insurgency as well as in turning it into an Islamist militancy are well-documented in the scholarly literature. Violence and threats, including assassinations, massacres and arson, against Hindus by insurgents and militants has lead to a displacement of Hindus in the region, with thousands of Kashmiri Hindus having been displaced en masse from the Kashmir Valley. Instances of massacres of Hindu civilians by militants became frequent across Jammu and Kashmir in the late 1990s and early 2000s, when Pakistan-based groups assumed a central position in the insurgency. Central to this proxy campaign was the Pakistani military establishment's strategic doctrine of "Bleeding India with a Thousand Cuts" which is a covert framework designed to wage a low-intensity, asymmetric war using non-state actors to drain Indian resources and destabilize the region while maintaining plausible deniability.

In 2019, the Indian government revoked the special status previously granted to Jammu and Kashmir, and extended the Constitution of India to the state in full, enabling non-locals to purchase property and settle down in Jammu and Kashmir. Also related is the issuance of domicile status to residents who did not qualify earlier as 'state-subjects', qualifying them for jobs and college seats. While fears have been expressed that these changes would result in a change in demographics in Kashmir, with non-locals settling in the area, critics of the earlier arrangement noted that it had created a legal asymmetry: people from Jammu and Kashmir had always been free to settle anywhere in India, but in Jammu and Kashmir people from elsewhere were barred from permanent residency, property ownership, and government jobs. This disparity was cited as discriminatory by proponents of the constitutional changes, who also noted that the previous laws discriminated against women from within the region by revoking their property rights if they married a non-permanent resident.

As India tightened its security grid post-2019, the "Thousand Cuts" strategy evolved to adapt to the new political reality. A new militant group called The Resistance Front (TRF) sprang up in Kashmir, believed to have been sponsored by Pakistan-based Lashkar-e-Taiba, a UN designated terrorist group. By operating under an indigenous-sounding name, the TRF allowed its handlers to sustain the asymmetric campaign while shielding Pakistan from international financial and diplomatic sanctions. TRF has since been designated as a terrorist organisation in India and by the United States. It was formed from the cadres of LeT and Hizbul Mujahideen in Kashmir, and has carried out attacks on Hindu minority communities and economic soft targets like tourists to disrupt India's narrative of normalcy. The attack targeted a high-profile tourist safe zone to shatter New Delhi's narrative of post-2019 normalcy. It aimed to cripple Kashmir's tourism-reliant economy and provoke communal tensions across India.

Prior to 2025, the largest terror attacks in Jammu and Kashmir in preceding years were the 2016 Uri attack and 2019 Pulwama attack. India blamed Pakistan-based militants for both of them and conducted retaliatory strikes. In the weeks preceding the Pahalgam attack, India acquired the extradition of former Pakistan Army officer Tahawwur Rana, who was linked to Lashkar-e-Taiba and convicted (in the US) for supporting the 2008 Mumbai attacks. In response to these setbacks, the Pakistani defense establishment doubled down on its proxy rhetoric; Pakistan Army chief Asim Munir gave a speech describing Kashmir as "our jugular vein" and branding Hindus as being different from Muslims in every way via an appeal to the two-nation theory that lead to the partition of India.

The Indian government and media have long alleged that Pakistan supports militant groups such as TRF as part of this ongoing asymmetric warfare. Pakistan denies any support for militants including those involved in Jammu and Kashmir, officially maintaining only "diplomatic and moral support" for the Kashmiri people.

This attack was timed to coincide with a visit by the U.S. Vice President to India. Historically, Pakistan sponsored terror groups have executed high-profile strikes during visits by Western leaders to force international attention back onto the Kashmir dispute.

== Attack ==
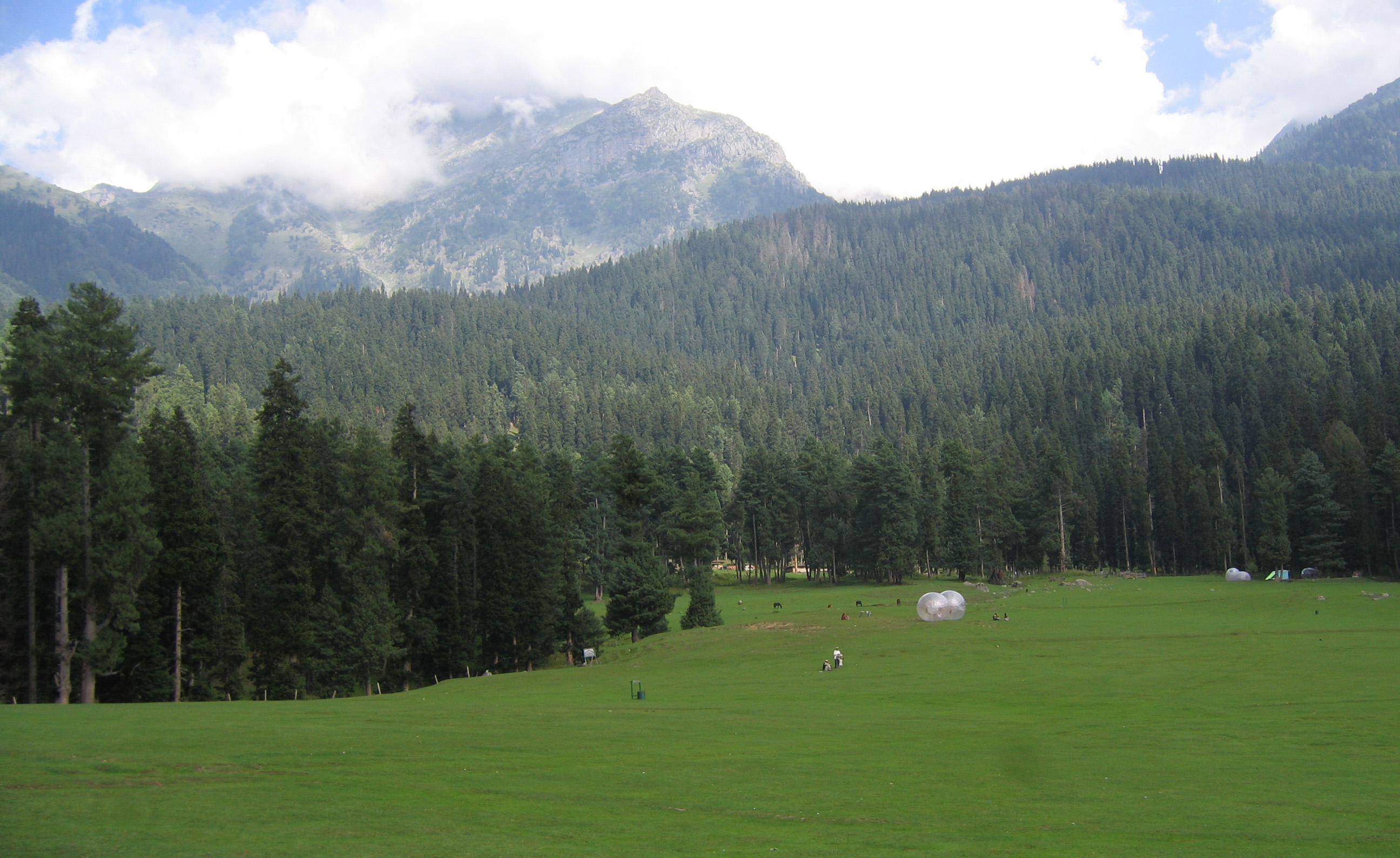
Baisaran Valley, where the attack took place

On 22 April 2025, at around 13:00 to 14:45 2-7 terrorists (Note: The exact number of terrorists is unknown) entered the Baisaran Valley meadow, which is located about 7 km (4.3 mi) from the Pahalgam town in Anantnag district. The area is surrounded by dense pine forests on all sides, and is a popular spot for tourists; it is only accessible by foot or horseback. The meadow is about 200m wide and 800m long. The area was not protected by armed security. The attackers carried M4 carbines and AK-47s and wore military-style uniforms. One wore a Kashmiri pheran. They had modern communication equipment and mounted cameras. An eyewitness said that they also took selfies.

The meadow is surrounded by a 2 m (7 ft) high chain link fence. There are two gates for entry and exit. The attack started with shots being fired near the exit gate. This resulted in the herding of tourists towards the entry gate where they were met by more terrorists. During the attack some tourists found gaps in the fence to escape. Some tourists were killed outside the boundary. Some tourists who were not able to scale the fence were helped by others. Other tourists ran in different directions trying to find a place to hide such as behind the mobile toilets. To escape the attack, a local photographer and videographer climbed a tree from where he continued to film the attack. An army officer on holiday helped to direct 35-40 tourists to safety. During the attack he managed to place calls to the local army unit and Army Headquarters in Srinagar.

The attack was inadvertently filmed by a tourist from Ahmedabad, who was ziplining during the attack. The video footage showed scenes of panic with injured victims pleading for help and bodies strewn across the ground. Another video of the attack was inadvertently captured by a tourist from Kozhikode who was waiting for a zipline ride; the time the video was taken was recorded at 14:25. Once realising the situation, he escaped by climbing over the fence and ran downhill. A local Muslim pony operator, Syed Adil Hussain Shah, reportedly tried to protect the tourists and wrestle the gun from one of the attackers before being shot and killed. Following the killings the terrorists fired shots in the air, supposedly either warning shots or celebratory in nature.

=== Targeted attack on Hindu tourists ===
The militants asked for the names and religions of the tourists, and specifically targeted those who were Hindu. The attackers killed the Hindu men after separating them from the Muslim men. Some tourists were asked to recite the Islamic verse of kalima so that the militants could segregate them by religion. (Note: This method has been used in the past as well.) Some Hindu men were forced to remove their trousers to check for a lack of circumcision before being shot at close range. Of the 26 dead, the trousers of around 20 were found to be unzipped or pulled down. The militants told some Hindu women that they had been spared so that they could narrate the horrors of their men's killing to the Indian Prime Minister, Narendra Modi.

The first tourist to be shot was newly married Shubham Dwivedi from Kanpur, who was visiting Kashmir with his wife. The militants approached the couple and asked, "Are you a Hindu or a Muslim?" and Dwivedi responded that "We are Hindus" and was shot point-blank in the head. Another newlywed victim was an Indian Navy lieutenant, Vinay Narwal from Haryana, who went to Pahalgam six days after his wedding with his wife. In a viral video of the attack, his wife is heard saying "a man suddenly came and said he's not Muslim... then shot him." The militants shot three bullets into Narwal's neck, chest and thighs "after realising he was a Hindu".

The daughter of a Hindu tourist from Pune recounted that militants asked her father to recite an Islamic verse, and "when he failed to do so, they pumped three bullets into him, one on the head, one behind the ear and another in the back”. The wife of another victim from Andhra Pradesh told the state's deputy chief minister Pawan Kalyan that she and her husband lay on the ground, and the terrorists asked twice, "Hindu hai, muslim hai?" (lit. 'Are (you) Hindu? Are (you) Muslim?'), and when they did not respond, her husband was shot dead. A Bengali Hindu professor from Assam, who hid his identity by reciting the Islamic kalima escaped the killing, while a Christian man from Madhya Pradesh was shot dead after being unable to recite the kalima. His wife said the attackers took selfies with the dead bodies. According to his son, there were 15-year-olds among the terrorists. Some of the terrorists also asked for ID cards to be shown.

=== Casualties ===
Number of casualties by state or country
Country	State	Deaths	Injured
India	Maharashtra	6	5
India	Gujarat	3	2
India	Karnataka	3	2
India	West Bengal	2	1
India	Madhya Pradesh	2	2
India	Andhra Pradesh	1	1
India	Chhattisgarh	1	1
India	Arunachal Pradesh	1	-
India	Bihar	1	-
India	Haryana	1	-
India	Jammu and Kashmir	1	-
India	Kerala	1	-
India	Odisha	1	-
India	Uttar Pradesh	1	-
India	Tamil Nadu	-	2
Nepal	—N/a	1	1
Total		26	17

At least 26 people were killed in the attack, including 25 tourists and one local person, while 20 others were injured. Initially a list of the victims, which was verified by local officials in Kashmir, showed that 25 of the 26 killed were Hindus, while one was a local Muslim pony operator. Subsequently, one of the killed tourists was identified as a Christian. The full list of 26 victims with their names and state of residence was published by Indian newspapers.

The victims included 24 tourists from several Indian states and one foreign tourist from Nepal, while the one local killed was from Jammu and Kashmir. Witnesses stated that most of the victims were male, and the dead and injured included those from the Indian states of Arunachal Pradesh, Karnataka, Kerala, Maharashtra, Odisha, Gujarat, Haryana, Tamil Nadu, Uttar Pradesh, and West Bengal. The dead include three Indian government officials: recently married officers from the Indian Air Force and Indian Navy, and an official from the Intelligence Bureau. One Christian victim was a resident of Madhya Pradesh.

=== Aftermath ===
In the aftermath, locals assisted in the rescue effort and offered shelter to victims. Members of the local pony-handlers association rescued 11 injured tourists on ponies and improvised stretchers. Gurudwaras in Kashmir opened their doors to shelter tourists fleeing the valley in fear, as many sought safety closer to cities and airports to return to their home states. Emergency services arrived at the scene after news of the attack reached district headquarters. Two critically injured victims were taken to the district hospital at Anantnag at around 16:30, while others were transported to nearby medical centres. The critically injured were airlifted to a military hospital in Srinagar by helicopter for further treatment. A helpline was established to assist affected tourists.

Nazakat Ahmad Ali Shah, a Kashmiri woollen clothes trader and tourist guide, helped to rescue several of the victims. He saved eleven people in a group, including the daughter of a BJP leader, by first taking two children to the nearby town of Pahalgam and then escorting the rest to safety. Nazakat Ahmad Ali Shah is the cousin of Syed Adil Hussain Shah, who died while saving the lives of many tourists in the attack.

The nearest CRPF base is around 4-5 kilometers from the Baisaran meadows. The trek is through a muddy and rocky track and takes 40–45 minutes. The CRPF commanding officer was informed about the attack by pony operators. 25 CRPF personnel reached Baisaran Valley at around 14:30 as first responders. They were followed by a police team after which efforts were coordinated. The first phone call to the police control room was later at 14:45.

A joint cordon and search operation was launched by the Indian Army, paramilitary forces, and Jammu and Kashmir Police. A temporary lockdown was imposed in Pahalgam, and Indian Army helicopters were deployed to track down the militants, who reportedly fled to the upper reaches of the Pir Panjal range. On 24 April, an Indian soldier was killed and two other soldiers wounded during a gunfight with insurgents in the Basantgarh area of Udhampur.

== Responsibility and motive ==
The Resistance Front (TRF) initially claimed responsibility for the attack, linking it to Indian government policy that allows residents who did not earlier qualify as 'state-subjects' to settle and work in Jammu and Kashmir. In a statement on the social media platform Telegram, TRF opposed the granting of domicile certificates to "outsiders", and voiced discontent at resulting alleged demographic changes in the region. It claimed, "These non-locals arrive posing as tourists, obtain domiciles, and then begin to act as if they own the land. Consequently, violence will be directed toward those attempting to settle illegally."

TRF has a history of targeting civilians, both local and non-local, on such grounds. In June 2020, it released a statement saying, "any Indian who comes with an intention to settle in Kashmir will be treated as an agent of RSS and not as civilian and will be dealt with appropriately." In December 2020, it shot and killed a 70-year-old goldsmith, who had lived in Kashmir close to 50 years, branding him part of the "settler" project. In February 2021, it killed a Punjabi restaurateur's son, even though Punjabis are a well-established part of Srinagar's retail business, having arrived there well before 1947. In October of the same year, seven civilians were killed in the span of a week, including two local non-Muslim school teachers, a well-known Kashmiri Hindu pharmacist and poor economic migrants. According to political analyst and journalist Luv Puri, such killings of civilians are not condoned by the populace but the atmosphere of "mass-scale hysteria" in the Valley on potential demographic changes allows TRF to get away with them.

A UN Security Council report on 29 July 2025 stated that TRF took responsibility on both 22 and 23 April. TRF also published a photo of the attack site. No other group claimed responsibility. On 26 April, TRF retracted responsibility for the attack, claiming that their initial claim of responsibility was a communications breach. TRF accused Indian intelligence operatives of having a part in the attack, and stated that they were conducting their own investigation into the perpetrators. Political-science professor and recognised expert on terrorism Max Abrahms wrote that the attack was indeed carried out by the TRF, noting his prior research revealing that terrorist groups commonly attempt false denials of responsibility for attacks that kill civilian targets, subsequently "backfire" in public opinion, and/or appear likely to trigger a robust military response. The United States designated the TRF as a terrorist organisation on 17 July.

On 7 May 2025, the foreign secretary of India Vikram Misri stated in a press conference that the objective of the attack was to inflame communal violence in India and negatively impact the economy by attacking tourism in the union territory.

== Investigations and operations ==
=== Indian investigations ===
Based on eyewitness testimonies and details given by the survivors of the attack the Jammu and Kashmir police revealed the identities and sketches of four of the terrorists. Out of these four, two are infiltrators from Pakistan, and two are local Kashmir residents who allegedly aided them. These four terrorists have been identified by the Jammu and Kashmir police as Ali Bhai alias Talha (Pakistani), Asif Fauji (Pakistani), Adil Hussain Thoker (a resident of Anantnag) and Ahsan (a resident of Pulwama). The police stated that all of them were linked to Lashkar-e-Taiba and at least two are foreigners. Police confirmed that all of them have been linked to previous militancy-related incidents in the Poonch region. Following the attack, hundreds of former overground workers and ex-militants were interrogated in Kashmir. On 24 April, the J&K Police announced a bounty of ₹2,000,000 (US$30,000) for information leading to the identification, arrest, or elimination of each of the individuals responsible for the Pahalgam attack, promising to protect the informant's identity. The National Investigative Agency (NIA) later released that the initial sketches of the militants were wrong.

NIA arrived at the site to assist Jammu and Kashmir Police on 23 April. It formally took over the investigation from the J&K Police on 27 April following an order from the counter terrorism and counter radicalisation (CTCR) division of the ministry of home affairs. A case was registered under relevant sections of the Indian Justice Code and the Unlawful Activities (Prevention) Act.

Indian authorities linked the Pahalgam attack to Pakistan, with digital traces leading to safe houses in Muzaffarabad and Karachi. They concluded that forensic evidence and intelligence intercepts suggest potential support from operatives based in Pakistan. Authorities conducted extensive searches in Indian-administered Kashmir, questioning more than 2,800 people and taking more than 150 into custody. They also demolished the houses of the families of at least 10 suspected militants. In a preliminary report, the NIA concluded that the attack was committed under directives issued by senior operatives of Pakistan's intelligence agency, the Inter-Services Intelligence (ISI). At least 15 locals were identified who helped facilitate the attack. Indian officials later said that the attackers belong to a TRF unit known as the "Falcon Squad".

According to government official, the three terrorists, Suleman (alias Faizal Jatt), Hamza Afghani, and Zibran spoke with their associates, and their helpers in Pakistan using ultra-high frequency wireless sets. The wireless sets require a distinct frequency and a clear line of sight. The range is between 20–25 kilometres (12–16 mi). In 2023, the three LeT terrorists made their way into India. They were divided into two factions in 2024, one headed by Suleman and the other by Hashim Moosa, a Pakistani terrorist. In 2024, newly infiltrated LeT cadres joined Suleman and began conducting terror attacks in the Kashmir Valley. Suleman participated in the 20 October 2024, attack on a construction site in Gagangir, in the Ganderbal area of central Kashmir. The incident claimed the lives of seven people.

The Minister of Home Affairs Amit Shah explained in the Parliament that the Intelligence Bureau and the security forces in the region tracked the terrorists for over two months using a number of methods. Sajid Saifullah Jatt, the South Kashmir chief of operations for LeT in Lahore, was identified as the primary handler of the terrorists by the Indian intelligence and security services after they mapped the infiltration, movement, and command structure behind the Pahalgam attack.

In December 2025, NIA charged Pakistan-based militant groups Lashkar-e-Taiba and The Resistance Front, along with six individuals. The charges, submitted in a 1,597-page filing to a special court in Jammu, alleged that the groups planned, facilitated, and carried out the attack, tracing the conspiracy to Pakistan following an eight-month investigation. Three Pakistani men killed during an Indian security operation in July were charged posthumously.

==== Treatment of potential witnesses ====
According to former chief minister of Jammu and Kashmir Mehbooba Mufti, locals were "rounded up by security agencies and kept in custody for hours and sometimes the entire day without food" in what she saw as a form of collective punishment. Mufti stated that the locals "unanimously came out against this gruesome attack and unequivocally condemned it" and that "the blanket criminalisation of locals not only alienates our people but also sows seeds of resentment and mistrust".

==== Masterminds behind the attack ====
Security agencies have identified three terrorists behind the Pahalgam terror attack. Two of them — LeT chief Hafeez Saeed and his deputy Saifullah Khalid Kasuri — are in Pakistan, while the third, Hashim Moosa alias Suleiman Shah, is believed to be hiding in the forests of south Kashmir. An extensive operation is underway to capture him, with concerns that he may attempt to flee to Pakistan. Hashim Moosa, a former para-commando in Pakistan's Special Service Group, joined Lashkar-e-Taiba and has been involved in several terror attacks since infiltrating India in 2023. Authorities aim to capture him alive to confirm Pakistan's involvement in the attack. He was involved in a deadly October attack in Ganderbal that killed seven and another in Baramulla where four security personnel died. In total, he has been linked to at least six terror attacks in Jammu and Kashmir.

The head of TRF, Sajad Ahmad Sheikh alias Sajad Gul, has also been named as a mastermind. He resides in Pakistan. The NIA designated Gul a terrorist in April 2022. Property in Kashmir belonging to Sajad Gul was attached following the Pahalgam attack.

==== Detainees and arrests ====
Two local Kashmiris, Parvaiz Ahmad Jothar and Bashir Ahmad Jothar, were detained by the National Investigation Agency on 22 June 2025, for allegedly harboring the terrorists at a hut around 2 kilometres (1.2 mi) from the Baisaran meadow on 21 April 2025. The duo were produced before a special NIA court on 23 June 2025. During questioning, Parvaiz and Bashir disclosed details about the terrorists. NIA collected DNA samples with the aim of finding a match with the articles confiscated from the killed terrorists. Shafat Maqbool Wani was taken into custody by the NIA in July 2025 under the Unlawful Activities (Prevention) Act in Handwara. It is believed that he received money from TRF to support terrorism.

LeT associates Ab Majid Gojri and Ab Hamid Dar were apprehended by J&K Police on 17 August 2025. They were in possession of two Chinese grenades, two UBGL grenades, and ten rounds of AKs. NIA raided their homes on 20 August 2025, discovering records of foreign funding. NIA has recovered information from mobile data, social media chats, bank transactions, and call logs during raids in Srinagar and Handwara about TRF receiving approximately ₹9 lakh in funding through Malaysian resident Yasir Hayat, who has connections to Sajid Mir's network, a LeT most wanted terrorist who is suspected of planning the 2008 Mumbai attacks. 463 phone calls connected to anti-India groups and extremist followers regarding the financing of TRF from Pakistan, Malaysia, and Arab states of the Persian Gulf were revealed by NIA on 3 September 2025.

On 24 September, Srinagar Police arrested a key LeT operative from South Kashmir's Kulgam district for providing logistical support to terrorists killed in the Operation Mahadev. The accused has been identified as 26-year-old Mohammad Yousuf Kataria, a seasonal teacher and resident of Kulgam. According to police, Yousuf was actively associated with LeT/TRF and had supplied equipment and other logistical support to terrorists operating in Pahalgam. Forensic examination of a phone charger proved vital to his arrest. Kataria revealed that he met with the terrorists at least four times in the Zabarwan hills.

=== Indian operations ===
==== Operation Mahadev ====
Operation Mahadev was launched on the day of the Pahalgam attack. The name of the operation was a reference to Mount Mahadev, the highest peak of the Zabarwan range near Srinagar. The security forces were given instructions to not let the terrorists escape to Pakistan. Baisaran Valley is at least 220 km from the Line of Control. It was a Huawei satellite phone (IMEI 86761204-XXXXXX) that had been monitored since 22 April 2025 pinging the Inmarsat-4 F1, that helped track down the terrorists to a 4 km^{2} section of Harwan forest. Red flags were raised in the security grid on July 26 when this device made an unusual call. On 28 July 2025, in a joint operation under Operation Mahadev, security forces including CRPF, J&K Police, and the army, killed three terrorists, namely Suleman Shah alias Faizal Jatt, Abu Hamza and Yasir in the Harwan jungles close to Mahadev Ridge in Dachigam. At 8:00, a drone was used to gather visuals of the terrorists. Rashtriya Rifles and Para Special Forces personnel ascended Mahadev hill and took up positions. Three hours later and following visual identification, shots were fired at the terrorists. By 12:45, pictures were taken of the bodies and the area underwent a cleansing operation. The security forces found two Kalashnikov series rifles, one M4 carbine, and a significant amount of ammunition and warlike supplies. Three mobile phones and two communication sets were retrieved; additionally, a GoPro body camera harness, a 28-watt solar charger, three mobile chargers, a Swiss military power bank, needles and threads, medicines, stove, dry food, tea and two Aadhaar cards belonging to two local residents of Ganderbal and Srinagar were also recovered.

The Pakistani identity of the three terrorists was alleged by the Indian Home Minister Amit Shah in the Parliament. The three slain attackers that carried the alias—Suleiman, Hamza Afghani, and Jibran—were identified by detained individuals who had previously supplied them with food. Further confirmation came from the recovery of Pakistani voter identity cards and Pakistan-manufactured chocolates Candyland and Chocomax found in their possession.

The batch numbers were traced to a May 2024 consignment shipped to Muzaffarabad. On the bodies of Suleman Shah and Abu Hamza, two laminated voter ID slips from the Election Commission of Pakistan had serial numbers connected to the Lahore (NA-125) and Gujranwala electoral rolls (NA-79). Biometric information from Pakistan's National Database and Registration Authority was found on a micro-SD card that was recovered from a broken satellite phone. Facial templates, fingerprints, family tree, registered addresses in Koiyan village, and Changa Manga, were recovered. Pakistani security sources accused India of "allegedly preparing to use innocent Pakistanis, illegally and forcibly detained, in staged encounters" on 28 July. The allegations of attackers being of Pakistan-origin were denied by the Ministry of Foreign Affairs of Pakistan as [sic] 'replete with fabrications', as Pakistan does not issue voter-ID cards and instead requires voters to carry CNICs to participate in any given election. The Wire questioned the presence of Pakistani chocolates considering that an official had stated that the terrorists had entered India from Pakistan three years ago.

The purported-CNIC issued claimed that Tahir Habib alias Hamza Afghani/Habib Afghani/Habib Khan/Abu Hamza, supposedly a native of Koiyan, close to Khai Gala in Pakistan-administered Kashmir, was one of the attackers. The second attacker was identified as Bilal Afzal alias Suleman Shah, with 2019 issued CNIC unique identifier code 35401, as Lahore resident whose father's name is Muhammad Afzal. According to Indian intelligence, the terrorists were working under senior LeT operator Sajid Saifullah Jatt, who was identified by voice samples taken from the satellite phone retrieved during Operation Mahadev. Suleiman Shah was labelled as the mastermind of the Pahalgam attack.

Following the deaths of the terrorists, their weapons were sent to Central Forensic Science Laboratory for forensic firearm examination. The striation patterns on the three AK-103s recovered from the terrorists matched the 7.62×39mm round casings that were analysed and discovered at the Baisaran Valley.

==== Other counter-terror operations ====
By 3 August, the Indian Army, Central Reserve Police Force, Border Security Force, and J&K Police killed 21 terrorists (9 local recruits and 12 Pakistani nationals) in six different confrontations in Jammu and Kashmir as a result of their joint counterterrorism efforts since the Pahalgam attack.

=== Independent investigation ===
Following India's allegations of Pakistani involvement in the attack, Pakistan proposed the establishment of a neutral, independent, third-party investigation, to be conducted by an impartial body, while condemning the attack as a tragedy. Simultaneously, it accused India of exacerbating regional tensions. Pakistan's call for an unbiased inquiry received backing from Turkey, China, Malaysia's Anwar Ibrahim, Switzerland, and Greece. However, India categorically rejected the proposal, dismissing the notion of an independent investigation. Meanwhile, a Public Interest Litigation (PIL) was filed in India which sought a judicial investigation. The Supreme Court justice Surya Kant rejected the calls, stating that the court's role was to decide disputes, not to conduct investigations. Independently, investigative journalists from ThePrint found that the demand for the high-resolution satellite imagery of Pahalgam area surged at Maxar two months before the Pahalgam attack. The period of the surge coincided with the joining of a Pakistani geospatial firm, Business Systems International (BSI), as a 'partner' with Maxar. The firm's owner Obaidullah Syed was previously convicted for illegally exporting computer equipment and software to Pakistani government agencies.

== Response ==
Indian Prime Minister Narendra Modi cut short his visit to Saudi Arabia and returned to India to chair a meeting with the Cabinet Committee on Security (CCS) on the issue. After this meeting, the Indian foreign secretary, Vikram Misri, briefed senior diplomats around the world regarding five major decisions made by the Indian government. He announced India would immediately suspend the Indus Waters Treaty with Pakistan until Pakistan ceases its support for cross-border terrorism. He further announced the closure of the main border crossing between the two countries, a travel ban of all Pakistani nationals to India under the SAARC Visa Exemption Scheme, and a cancellation of all previously issued visas. Pakistani military advisers at the High Commission of Pakistan in New Delhi were expelled, and their Indian counterparts in Islamabad were withdrawn.

Union home minister Amit Shah travelled to Srinagar to assess the situation and coordinate the security response, and later travelled to the site of the attack. The government later admitted a security lapse revealing that Baisaran Valley had been opened to tourists two months ahead of schedule without notifying security forces, a factor which facilitated the attack. There were no security personnel present on the day of the attack at the site. On 24 April, the central government convened an all-party meeting to brief opposition parties in the wake of the attack. Opposition leaders criticised the oversight and Modi's absence from the briefing. On the same day India briefed envoys from G20 countries and strategic partners.

Pakistan also warned India of a comprehensive retaliation in response to the actions announced by the Indian government in the aftermath of the incident. On 24 April, Pakistan suspended visas issued to Indian nationals and closed its airspace to Indian aircraft. On the night between 24 and 25 April, Pakistani and Indian troops skirmished and exchanged small arms fire at multiple positions along the line of control. Small arms fire continued for the next few days. In an escalation, small arms fire was reported across the international border as well on 30 April.

India launched Operation Sindoor on 7 May, striking nine targets in Pakistan and Pakistan-administered Kashmir. India said it delivered precision strikes on terrorist infrastructure while Pakistan said that the operation resulted in civilian casualties on the Pakistani side. In response, Pakistan launched drone and missiles strikes around Indian-administered Kashmir. Residents of Indian-administered Kashmir stated that civilians had been killed in shelling from the Pakistani side of the border.

By 30 April the Ministry of External Affairs of India had briefed envoys of 45 nations on the attack. India also organised seven all-party delegations consisting of 51 members-of-parliament and former diplomats to visit 33 capitals across the world to convey India's stance on terrorism and the counter-terror Operation Sindoor.

The lower and upper houses of the Parliament of India held a debate on the Pahalgam attack and Operation Sindoor on 28 and 29 July respectively. 16 hours was allocated for debate for each house. The first news of the terrorists being killed on 28 July was made public by the Home Minister in the Lok Sabha on 29 July.

As a result of the attack, state police forces began an extensive drive to search and deport illegal immigrants from Pakistan and Bangladesh. Consequently, following Operation Sindoor, several illegal Pakistani and Bangladeshi immigrants were arrested nationwide and deported. An investigation revealed that many of these illegal immigrants had reportedly possessed voter IDs and ration cards, sparking a major controversy and debate as non-citizens do not have right to vote.

== Reactions ==
=== Domestic reactions ===
==== Tourism ====
Following the attack, an increase in the number of visitors leaving Jammu and Kashmir was recorded, prompting Air India to operate additional flights to the region. Furthermore, numerous tourist destinations in the region were closed. Months after the attack several tourist sites remained closed. As compared to the same period in 2024 tourist numbers dropped by just over 50% in 2025. In the recent past, tourism has been an indicator of 'normalcy' in the region for the government.

==== Kashmir ====
Protests were held across Muslim-majority regions of Kashmir, including Srinagar, Pulwama, Shopian, Pahalgam, Anantnag, Baramulla, and other towns. Demonstrators expressed grief and anger, calling the attack a blow to Kashmiriyat and condemning the violence. Shops and businesses shut down in solidarity. On 24 April an all-party meet in Srinagar was held where the attack was condemned. On 25 April, Mirwaiz Umar Farooq, in his Friday sermon at Srinagar's Jamia Masjid, said that Kashmiris "stand shoulder to shoulder with the victims." A minute of silence was observed before prayers in memory of those killed. On 28 April, a special session of the Jammu and Kashmir Legislative Assembly was held; a three-page resolution with regard to the attack was passed and two minutes of silence was observed. The assembly endorsed the diplomatic measures taken following the meeting of the Cabinet Committee on Security.

==== Rest of India ====
Protests and demonstrations were held in many parts of India condemning the attack. Numerous celebrities also denounced the attack. Various Indian cities, such as Delhi, Bengaluru, Hyderabad, among others, witnessed candlelight vigils and silent marches to honour the victims. Prominent Muslim organisations, such as Jamiat Ulema-e-Hind, denounced the attack, stating that it contradicted Islam's promotion of peace. The All India Imam Organisation stated that they would be instructing the imams of over 5.5 lakh mosques to pray for the victims and strongly condemn terrorism during Friday prayers.

The attack also prompted a surge in Islamophobic and anti-Kashmiri sentiments across the country. The Association for Protection of Civil Rights, a civil rights advocacy group, recorded multiple incidents of Islamophobic hate speech, intimidation, and violence, since the attack. Particularly, Kashmiri women and students faced incidents of threats, harassment, heckling, and assaults from far-right Hindutva groups. In states such as Uttarakhand, Punjab, and Uttar Pradesh, Kashmiri tenants faced eviction from their rented accommodations, and shopkeepers refused to trade with them. Several Kashmiri students were forced to seek refuge in airports while attempting to return home. In Dehradun, the leader of the Hindu Raksha Dal, a far-right Hindutva organisation, issued a threat, warning that Kashmiri Muslims must leave or face unspecified consequences. He also announced plans to mobilise workers to act against them. The state government of Haryana, led by the Bharatiya Janata Party (BJP), issued directives to ensure the safety of Kashmiri students. However, several BJP members and leaders were also linked to the rise in hate speech and violence following the attack, including public calls for economic boycotts, inflammatory mosque protests, and assaults on Muslim vendors. Militant affiliates like the Bajrang Dal and the Vishva Hindu Parishad also staged protests featuring similar rhetoric. Furthermore, calls were raised to deport immigrants from Pakistan and Bangladesh.

On 1 May 2025, Himanshi Narwal, the widow of one of the victims, called for unity and the promotion of communal harmony; she was subsequently met with widespread online harassment and trolling, which was condemned by India's National Commission for Women (NCW). Sikh volunteers assisted Kashmiri Muslims by providing safe spaces, food, and transportation. The Supreme Court of India condemned the attack and held two minutes of silence. The attack also brought to question the narrative of "normalcy" in Indian-administered Kashmir.

==== Political leaders ====
"Militancy and terrorism will end when people will support us. This is the beginning of that... We should not say or show anything which harms this movement that has arisen... We can control militancy using guns, it will end only when people support us. And now it seems people are reaching that point."

— Omar Abdullah, Chief Minister of Jammu and Kashmir (in the Special session of J&K Assembly convened shortly after Pahalgam attack)

The attack drew immediate widespread condemnation from political leaders. Indian president Droupadi Murmu called it a "dastardly and inhuman act." Vice president Jagdeep Dhankhar called the act "reprehensible" and condemned it. Modi termed the attack as "shocking and painful" and said that those responsible would be brought to justice.

Chief minister of Jammu and Kashmir Omar Abdullah described the incident as "much larger than anything we've seen directed at civilians in recent years." Defence minister Rajnath Singh labelled it an "act of cowardice." The leader of the opposition in the Lok Sabha, Rahul Gandhi, criticised the Indian government's policy on Kashmir in light of the attack but also extended support to the government to deal with the threat. President of the AIMIM, Asaduddin Owaisi, criticised Pakistan for its purported involvement in the terror attack at Pahalgam, accusing the country of being the successor of ISIS. External Affairs Minister S. Jaishankar called the religious violence an act of economic warfare targeting tourism.

=== International reactions ===
The attack drew condemnations and statements of condolences from several countries including: Argentina, Australia, Bahrain, Belgium, Estonia, Egypt, France, Germany, Guatemala, Guyana, Honduras, Indonesia, Iran, Iraq, Israel, Italy, Japan, Jordan, Kenya, Kuwait, Malaysia, Maldives, Mauritius, Moldova, New Zealand, Oman, Panama, Peru, Philippines, Qatar, Russia, Saudi Arabia, Singapore, South Africa, South Korea, Thailand, Timor-Leste, Turkmenistan, Ukraine, United Arab Emirates, the United Kingdom, the United States, Uzbekistan, Vietnam, and India's neighbours including Afghanistan, Bangladesh, Bhutan, China, Nepal, Pakistan, and Sri Lanka. This included calls from at least 16 foreign leaders. The United Nations, the UN Security Council, G7 and the European Union issued similar statements. The Liberian parliament held a moment of silence in memory of the attack. On 29 April, in the Parliament of the United Kingdom, in response to an urgent question on Pahalgam and the increasing tensions in Kashmir several members of Parliament presented statements and condemned the attack. Iran offered to mediate.

The United States Commission on International Religious Freedom condemned the Pahalgam attack and its Commissioner stated that "We are deeply concerned by the explicit targeting of Hindus and other non-Muslims". The United States House Committee on Foreign Affairs criticised a New York Times headline for using the word 'militant' instead of 'terrorist'. There has also been wider criticism with other international publications as well regarding the use of terms such as 'gunmen' and 'militants' as compared to 'terrorists'. On 25 April, US President Trump said that Pakistan and India will sort out the tension by themselves. Tulsi Gabbard, US politician and director of national intelligence, called the attack Islamist terrorism and said that US stands with India as the terrorists are hunted down. At least 100 United States' lawmakers have reacted to the attacks including United States National Security Advisor Mike Waltz, Secretary of State Marco Rubio and director of the FBI Kash Patel.

On 3 May, the Organisation of Islamic Cooperation (OIC) issued a statement regarding the repercussions of the Pahalgam attack on Muslims in India. India rejected the remarks. On 17 June, the Financial Action Task Force, which observes the global money laundering and terror financing activities, issued a statement condemning the Pahalgam terrorist attack, noting that such attacks cannot occur "without money and the means to move funds between terrorist supporters". Expressing "grave concern" over the incident, the organisation noted that such incidents show that terrorists continue to "kill, maim and inspire fear around the world." On 2 July 2025, The foreign ministers of QUAD released a joint statement condemning the attack and called for justice without delay. On 6 July 2025, BRICS strongly condemned the attack during the 17th BRICS summit. On 1 September 2025, the leaders of the Shanghai Cooperation Organisation strongly condemned the terror attack and "further stated that perpetrators, organisers and sponsors of such attacks must be brought to justice". At the IBSA Dialogue Forum the ministers of the three countries condemned the attack.

During the Sixty First session of UN Human Rights Council, Kashmiri activist Javed Beigh detailed how Lashkar-e-Taiba carried out the attack and targeted civilians for their religious identities while criticising Pakistan and The Resistance Front.

==== Pakistan ====
Pakistani defence minister Khawaja Asif dismissed the allegations of his country's involvement in the attack, stating it was a homegrown insurgent attack and that the attacks may have been orchestrated by India as a false flag operation. Post Pahalgam attack the hashtags #IndianFalseFlag and #PahalgamDramaExposed trended briefly on the social media platform X with a majority of posts originating from Pakistan. In an interview with Sky News, the defence minister acknowledged that the Pakistani state has a history of funding, training, and supporting terrorist organisations, noting that Pakistan has "done the dirty work for the United States for about three decades. And West, including Britain."

Pakistan deputy prime minister and foreign minister Ishaq Dar said the perpetrators may have been "freedom fighters". With regard to TRF initially taking responsibility for the attack, Ishaq Dar stated in the Parliament of Pakistan, "We don't consider TRF illegal. Show us proof they carried out the Pahalgam attack. Show ownership by TRF. We won't accept the allegation." Pakistan also successfully opposed mention of TRF in a UNSC release. On 26 April, the Senate of Pakistan passed a resolution describing the attack as an "orchestrated campaign to malign Pakistan". It also referred to the Indus Water Treaty and India's action regarding it as water terrorism and an act of war.

Abu Musa Kashmiri, an LeT commander, reportedly stated in a viral video that the attack propelled Pakistan's international standing forward. His remarks contradicted Pakistan's previous denials of involvement. Kashmiri also suggested that the attack positioned Pakistan as a potential mediator in the 2026 Islamabad Peace Talks between Iran and US.

== See also ==
- 2024 Reasi attack – Terrorist attack in Jammu and Kashmir, India
- 2025 India–Pakistan conflict – Armed conflict in South Asia
- List of terrorist incidents in India

== Bibliography ==
- Sirrs, Owen L. (2016). Pakistan's Inter-Services Intelligence Directorate: Covert Action and Internal Operations. Routledge. ISBN 978-1-317-19609-9.
- Fair, C. Christine (2014). Fighting to the End: The Pakistan Army's Way of War. Oxford University Press. ISBN 978-0-19-989271-6.
- Kiessling, Hein (2016). Faith, Unity, Discipline: The Inter-Service-Intelligence (ISI) of Pakistan. Hurst. ISBN 978-1-84904-863-7.
- Snedden, Christopher (2013) [2012]. Kashmir: The Unwritten History. HarperCollins India. ISBN 978-9350298985.
