= Murshidabad violence =

2025 Violence in Murshidabad, West Bengal

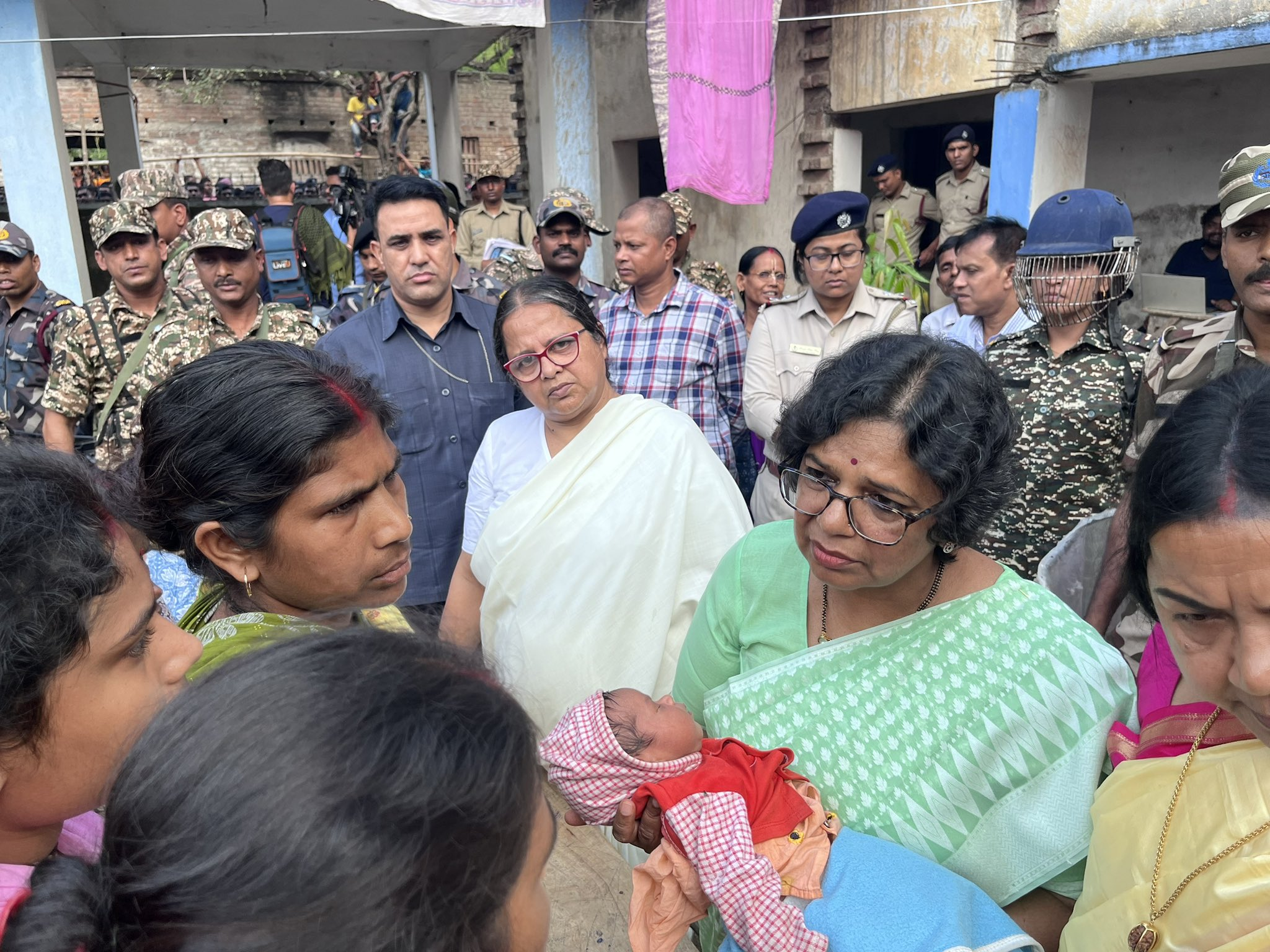
- Women displaced by the Murshidabad riots taking refuge in Malda meet NCW's Rahatkar.
- Date: 8–13 April 2025
- Location: Murshidabad, West Bengal, India; 24.18°N 88.27°E
- Caused by: The Waqf (Amendment) Act, 2025
- Methods: Protesting, rioting, stone-pelting, looting, arson, mobbing

Casualties
- Deaths: 3
- Injuries: 10+
- Arrested: 300+
- Location of the violence in West Bengal, India

The Murshidabad violence refers to the violent incidents in April 2025 in the Murshidabad district of West Bengal, India, following protests against the Waqf (Amendment) Act, 2025, in which many Hindu families were forced to vacate their homes, after a gathering of Muslims turned violent. Many Hindu homes were pelted with stones and their properties, including cattle, were torched by rioters. This led to unrest in the region.

The violence included the blocking of National Highway 12, the setting ablaze of police vehicles, attacks on a local MP's office, and disruption of train services at Nimtita railway station. Over 400 Hindus, including women and children, were displaced from affected areas and took shelter in the neighbouring Malda district.

In response, additional security forces were deployed, internet services were suspended, and the Calcutta High Court ordered the deployment of central forces to restore order. Political parties issued varied reactions, with the Bharatiya Janata Party (BJP) criticizing the state government and the Trinamool Congress (TMC) alleging that the rioting was the BJP's fault. The court sought a status report from the TMC state government.

In December 2025, a district court in Murshidabad convicted 13 persons for the murder of Chandan Das and his father during the April 2025 communal violence in Murshidabad, while also directing the TMC state government to pay compensation to the victims' families.

== Background ==
The Waqf (Amendment) Act, 2025, was passed by both Houses of Parliament following extended debates. It received presidential assent from President Droupadi Murmu on 5 April 2025 and was officially notified, coming into effect on 8 April 2025.

The legislation introduced significant changes to the administration and governance of Waqf properties across the country. Critics argued that the amendments infringed upon religious freedoms and minority rights, leading to widespread concerns, particularly among Muslim communities.

In West Bengal, which has a substantial Muslim population, the Act was met with strong opposition. Various groups organized protests to express their dissatisfaction. Despite assurances from Chief Minister Mamata Banerjee that the Act would not be enforced in West Bengal, demonstrations intensified, particularly in the Murshidabad district.

The protests, initially peaceful, soon turned violent, resulting in clashes between demonstrators and law enforcement agencies. The unrest ultimately led to casualties, property damage, and disruption of public services, prompting the intervention of central paramilitary forces following orders from the Calcutta High Court.

== Protests and violence ==
The violence in the Murshidabad district began in early April 2025, following protests against the Waqf (Amendment) Act, 2025. Demonstrators expressed concerns over provisions in the amended law, which are believed to affect property rights and religious institutions. The protests initially started peacefully but escalated into violent clashes in areas such as Jangipur and Umarpur.

On 8 April 2025, protesters blocked National Highway 12 at Umarpur, disrupting traffic and setting police vehicles on fire. The situation deteriorated further on 11 April when demonstrators vandalized public and private vehicles, attacked the office of local Member of Parliament (MP) Khalilur Rahaman, and set a police jeep ablaze. Train services were disrupted as protesters squatted on railway tracks and pelted stones at a stationary train at Nimtita railway station.

=== Murder of Chandan Das and his father, Hargobind Das ===
On 12 April, a violent attack by a mob resulted in the lynching and deaths of a father, Hargobind Das, and his son Chandan Das, when their residence was targeted. According to the Special Investigation Team (SIT) report, the attackers broke down the main door, dragged out Chandan Das and Hargobind Das, and struck them in the back with an axe; a man reportedly stood guard until they died. The report also noted that in some attacks, the mob cut off the water supply to prevent fires from being extinguished. It stated, "The Islamists have burnt all the clothes in the house with the kerosene oil and the woman of the house had no clothes to cover her body." A 17-year-old, Izaz Ahmed Sheikh, also died after being shot during the unrest. Following violent protests and communal unrest, over 400 Hindus, including women and children, fled from areas like Dhulian, Suti, and Shamsherganj in Murshidabad district. They reportedly crossed the Bhagirathi River and took shelter at schools in Malda district, where local authorities provided temporary relief.

The violence resulted in a total of three fatalities and injuries to more than ten individuals. Over 274 people were arrested and 60 FIRs were lodged in connection with the unrest. Authorities imposed Section 144 of the Criminal Procedure Code in affected areas, restricting public gatherings, and internet services were suspended to prevent the spread of rumours.

== Response ==
Following the outbreak of violence in Murshidabad, the Government of West Bengal took several measures to restore order. The state administration deployed additional police personnel to the affected areas and temporarily suspended internet services in parts of the district to prevent the spread of misinformation. Chief Minister Mamata Banerjee appealed for calm and stated that the Waqf (Amendment) Act, 2025, which had triggered the protests, would not be implemented in West Bengal.

The Calcutta High Court directed the deployment of central forces, including units of the Border Security Force (BSF), to assist in maintaining law and order. The court also sought a status report from the state government regarding the steps taken to control the situation.

In December 2025, a district court in Murshidabad convicted 13 persons in the murder of father and son duo Harogobind Das and Chandan Das, who were hacked to death by a mob during communal violence in April 2025. The court sentenced all 13 convicts to lifetime imprisonment for the lynching of Chandan Das and his father at Jafrabad village in Samserganj region of Murshidabad, while also directing the state government to pay ₹15 lakh as compensation to the victims’ family.

== Reactions ==
Leader of the Opposition Suvendu Adhikari commented on the incident via the social media platform X, describing the violence as a "premeditated act" by extremist elements. He stated that the events did not constitute a protest but were instead an attack on democratic institutions and governance, allegedly carried out by jihadist forces aiming to instill fear and disorder. Adhikari called for strict legal action against those responsible for the destruction of public property and for issuing threats to government officials.

Chief Minister of West Bengal Mamata Banerjee condemned the violence in Murshidabad and appealed for peace across all communities. She clarified that the state government would not implement the newly enacted Waqf (Amendment) Act, describing it as legislation brought by the central government, and questioned the need for protests in the state. In a message posted on X, Banerjee urged people of all religions to remain calm and refrain from engaging in any unrighteous behaviour in the name of religion. She warned against political parties allegedly trying to incite riots for political gain and assured that strict action would be taken against those responsible for the violence.

West Bengal BJP president and Member of Parliament Sukanta Majumdar alleged that the state government, under Chief Minister Mamata Banerjee, was failing to take appropriate action during the violence in Murshidabad linked to protests against the Waqf (Amendment) Act. He accused the police of inaction, claiming they remained silent under the Chief Minister's directives. Majumdar further alleged that Banerjee was "trying to create a Bangladesh-like situation by threatening Hindus." He added that the party was in touch with central authorities and that the Union Home Minister had been informed of the developments.

In May 2025, West Bengal Governor C. V. Ananda Bose submitted a report to the Union Ministry of Home Affairs on the Murshidabad riots, raising concerns about rising radicalisation and communal instability in the region. On 5 May 2025, Mamata Banerjee visited the riot-hit areas of the Murshidabad district, where she publicly accused the BJP-led central government and the BSF of instigating communal violence.

== See also ==
- 2025 Nagpur violence
- Shaheen Bagh protest
- 2021 West Bengal post-poll violence
- 1964 Calcutta riots
