= Mohammad Shahzad (disambiguation) =

Mohammad Shahzad may refer to:

- Mohammad Shahzad, Afghan cricketer
- Muhammad Shahzad, Indian politician
- Mohammad Shahzad (Emirati cricketer)
- Mohammad Shehzad, Pakistani cricketer
