= Custodian for Enemy Property for India =

Indian government department

The Custodian of Enemy Property for India is an Indian government department that is empowered to appropriate property under the Enemy Property Act, 1968 in India owned by Pakistani nationals. After the Indo-Pakistani War of 1965, the Enemy Property Act was promulgated in 1968. The act authorised the Government of India to appoint a custodian for enemy property for India and one or more deputy/assistant custodians as assistances. There is also a provision which validates the appointments made under the Defence of India Rules 1962 and 1971. The Pakistani nationals in question were citizens of undivided India before the Partition of India in 1947 took place, and left India to settle down in Pakistan.

Under the notification issued on 10 September and 11 September 1965, the central government vested the following property in India belonging to, held by, or managed on behalf of Pakistani nationals; entrusting the property and its appurtenances in the hands of the custodian with immediate effect. This includes all immovable property, all lockers and safe deposits; and all negotiable instruments such as promissory notes, shares, debentures and other commerce.

Citizens of India are banned from entering any transactions by way of granting development rights, selling, transferring or mortgaging more than a third of a property in India declared as "enemy" property. The head office of the custodian is located in Delhi with branch offices in Mumbai, Kolkata and Lucknow.

The current Custodian of enemy property for India (CEPI) is Mr. Rahul Ramesh Nangare (IRS-C&IT, 1999 batch). The post of CEPI was upgraded to Joint Secretary level and he joined on 7 April 2023.(Order)

== Income ==
The fees equal two percent on the gross income from the properties vested in the custodian. The income received by way of rent, interest etc. on securities is invested in the Reserve Bank of India. The maturity for the year 2004-2005 is expected to touch 135 crores. A balance of 0.22 crores is in the personal ledger account of the custodian maintained by the Central Bank of India. A sum of 51 lakhs (5.1 million) is kept in the fixed deposit in the name of Habib Bank.

== Property disposal ==
In December 2017, India's Minister of Home Affairs Rajnath Singh granted the approval as per the amended "Enemy Property Act, 2017" to dispose of the properties free from the legal hurdles. 6,229 properties vested with the custodian have been already surveyed, remaining 2,999 vested with the custodian will be surveyed soon. There are 5,863 more properties in the process of vesting with the custodian will also be surveyed. Pakistan has already disposed of previously Indian-owned properties in Pakistan, according to Rajnath Singh, the then Home Minister of India.

== See also ==
- Enemy Property Act, 1968, basis of Custodian for Enemy Property for India
- Central Waqf Council
- Evacuee Trust Property Board
- Political integration of India
- Privy Purse in India
- Jinnah House
