= Uttarakhand Waqf Board =

Statutory board of Uttarakhand

Agency overview
- Jurisdiction: Government of Uttarakhand
- Headquarters: Alpsankhyak Kalyan Bhawan, Dehradun, Uttarakhand, India
- Minister responsible: Khajan Dass, Government of Uttarakhand
- Agency executive: Mohammad Arif Khan, Chief Executive Officer
- Website: ukwms.org uttarakhandwaqfboard.uk.gov.in

Uttarakhand Waqf Board is a statutory board of the Government of Uttarakhand in India.

== History ==
Central Waqf Council was set up by the Government of India's Ministry of Minority Affairs as an Indian statutory body in 1964 under Waqf Act, 1954 (now a sub section the Waqf Act, 1995) for the purpose of advising it on matters pertaining to working of the State Waqf Boards and proper administration of the Waqfs in the country. Waqf is a permanent dedication of movable or immovable properties for religious, pious or charitable purposes as recognized by Muslim law, given by philanthropists. The grant is known as Mushrut-ul-Khidmat, while a person making such dedication is known as Waqf.

The Uttarakhand Waqf Board, was established by the Government of Uttarakhand under Central Waqf Council on 5 August 2003 vide notification on Gazette of Uttarakhand.

== List of chairman ==
S. No.	Name	Term of office		
1.	Chaudhary Raees Ahmad	08 November 2004	25 December 2007	3 years, 47 days
–	District Magistrate of Dehradun (administrator)	26 December 2007	22 June 2010	2 years, 178 days
2.	Rao Sharafat Ali	1 July 2010	25 April 2012	1 year, 299 days
3.	Rao Kale Khan	16 February 2013	22 June 2015	2 years, 126 days
–	District Magistrate of Dehradun (administrator)	26 May 2016	4 December 2016	192 days
4.	Mohammad Akram	05 December 2016	24 October 2021	4 years, 323 days
–	Ahmed Iqbal, IAS (administrator)	28 October 2021	7 September 2022	313 days
5.	Mohammad Shadab Shams	6 September 2022	Incumbent	3 years, 337 days

== Properties ==
District wise Immovable and Assessable Waqf Properties

S. No.	District	Immovable Properties	Assessable Properties
1	Almora	94	53
2	Bageshwar	13	1
3	Chamoli	2	1
4	Champawat	60	50
5	Dehradun	1715	1250
6	Haridwar	1926	1177
7	Nainital	452	310
8	Pauri Garhwal	128	96
9	Pithoragarh	12	4
10	Rudraprayag	2	0
11	Tehri Garhwal	17	0
12	Udham Singh Nagar	939	511
13	Uttarkashi	2	0
Total		5362	3456
