= Custodian of Enemy Property =

Government body handling property claims created by war

The Custodian of Enemy Property is an institution that handles property claims created by war. In wartime, civilian property may be left behind or taken by the occupying state. In ancient times, such property was considered war loot, and the legal right of the winner. In the Fourth Geneva Convention Article 147, such action is defined as war crime:

"Grave breaches to which the preceding Article relates shall be those involving any of the following acts, if committed against persons or property protected by the present Convention: willful killing, torture or inhuman treatment, including biological experiments, willfully causing great suffering or serious injury to body or health, unlawful deportation or transfer or unlawful confinement of a protected person, compelling a protected person to serve in the forces of a hostile Power, or willfully depriving a protected person of the rights of fair and regular trial prescribed in the present Convention, taking of hostages and extensive destruction and appropriation of property not justified by military necessity and carried out unlawfully and wantonly."

== Custodian of Enemy Property laws ==
The following list is incomplete.

- Bangladesh: The Enemy Property Act was established to manage property of enemies (Indians) taken while it was part of Pakistan (1948–1971) or during its independence war (1971).
- Canada: The Office of the Custodian of Enemy Property was established in 1916 and existed until 1985, dealing with the property of Canada's enemies in both World Wars as well as the seized property of Japanese Canadians.
- India: The Custodian for Enemy Property for India was established to manage Pakistani property taken in the Second Kashmir War (1965).
- Israel: The Absentees' Property Laws established the Office of the Israeli Custodian of Absentee Property to manage the property of absentee Palestinian refugees (including refugees who later became citizens of Israel, called "present absentees") of the 1948 Arab–Israeli War (1948). During the Six-Day War (1967), along with previously Palestinian properties, Israel took control of the Jewish property held by the Jordanian Custodian for Enemy Property and put it under the control of their own Custodian of Absentee Property. Most of this property remains under the Custodian, while some (as in the Sheikh Jarrah case) has been granted to Jews contesting ownership, after claiming it in court.
- Jordan: The Jordanian Custodian of Enemy Property was established to handle property taken from Jews in the West Bank taken in the 1948 Arab–Israeli War (1948). In 1967, this function was disbanded (see above).
- United Kingdom: Under the Trading with the Enemy Act 1914 enemy property was inspected by the Board of Trade and ownership was transferred to the Public Trustee. Initially, the Public Trustee held ownership on trust for the enemy but after a 1916 amendment the Public Trustee was required to sell the assets and hold the proceeds in trust. Under section 7 of the Trading with the Enemy Act 1939, custodians were established for England and Wales, (Note: The 1939 Act only specifies "England, Scotland and Northern Ireland respectively", but since it predates the Welsh Language Act 1967, the Wales and Berwick Act 1746 provides that "England" includes Wales.) Scotland, and Northern Ireland, and for British dependent territories, including (until 1944) the parts of China where the British had extraterritorial rights following the Treaty of Nanking.
- United States: The Office of Alien Property Custodian was an office within the United States federal government during World War I and again during World War II.
