= Karnataka Wakf Board Land Scam =

Land scam in India

Karnataka Wakf Board Land Scam, exposed in 2012 by a report submitted by the Karnataka State Minorities Commission Chairman Anwar Manippady, entails alleged misappropriation of ₹2,000 billion (US$24 billion) through illegal land grab] by Karnataka Waqf Board officials and politicians.

== History ==
In March 2012, Anwar Manippady, the Chairman of the Karnataka State Minorities Commission submitted a report to the chief minister of Karnataka state, D.V. Sadananda Gowda, which alleged that 27,000 acres of land controlled by the Karnataka Wakf Board had either been misappropriated or allocated illegally. The value of the land has been estimated at Rs. 2 trillion (short scale) (US$39 billion).

The Karnataka Wakf Board is a Muslim charitable trust that manages and oversees property that have been donated for use by the poor. The report commissioned by Manippady alleges that the Karnataka Wakf Board had allowed almost 50% of its land to be misappropriated by politicians and board members, in collusion with the real estate mafia for a fraction of its market value.

Manippady has recommended that the government establish a committee to investigate corrupt activities on the Wakf Board and appoint a task force to recover properties that have been illegally sold by the Wakf Board. The Income Tax Department has already initiated a probe into this.

== See also ==
- Land grab
- Waqf (Amendment) Act, 2025
- List of scandals in India
- Corruption in India
