= Bihar State Shia Waqf Board =

Shia Wakf Board in Bihar

Bihar State Shia Wakf Board
Agency overview
- Formed: 1948
- Jurisdiction: Government of Bihar

Bihar State Shia Wakf Board is an agency of the Government of Bihar constituted in 1948 for better administration of Waqf in the state of Bihar in India.
