= Enemy Property Act, 1968 =

Regulatory law on Indian property

Parliament of India
- Long title: An Act to provide for the continued vesting of enemy property vested in the Custodian of Enemy Property for India under the Defence of India Rules, 1962 and the Defence of India Rules, 1971, and for matters connected therewith.
- Citation: Act No. 34 of 1968
- Territorial extent: whole of India
- Passed by: Lok Sabha
- Passed: 31 July 1968
- Passed by: Rajya Sabha
- Passed: August 1968
- Assented to by: President Zakir Husain
- Assented to: 20 August 1968
- Effective: 10 July 1968

Legislative history

Initiating chamber: Lok Sabha
- Bill title: Enemy Property Bill, 1968
- Introduced by: Minister of Commerce Dinesh Singh
- Introduced: 26 July 1968
- Passed: 31 July 1968

Revising chamber: Rajya Sabha
- Passed: August 1968

Repeals
- Enemy Property Ordinance, 1968 (7 of 1968)

Amended by
- Enemy Property (Amendment) Act, 1977 (40 of 1977); Enemy Property (Amendment and Validation) Act, 2017 (3 of 2017)
- Status: In force

The Enemy Property Act, 1968 is an Act of the Parliament of India which enables and regulates the appropriation of property in India owned by Pakistani nationals. The act was passed following the Indo-Pakistani War of 1965. Ownership is passed to the Custodian of Enemy Property for India, a government department. There are also movable properties categorized as enemy properties.

== Amendments ==
=== Enemy Property (Amendment and Validation) Act, 2017 ===
Minister of State for Home Affairs Kiren Rijiju during the Modi Government introduced the Enemy Property (Amendment and Validation) Bill, 2016. The measure seeks to replace an ordinance promulgated to this effect on 7 January 2016.

The 2016 bill seeks to do the following:

- The Bill amends the Enemy Property Act, 1968, to vest all rights, titles and interests over enemy property in the Custodian of the Enemy Property for India.
- The Bill declares transfer of enemy property by the enemy, conducted under the Act, to be void. This applies retrospectively to transfers that have occurred before or after 1968.
- The Bill prohibits civil courts and other authorities from entertaining disputes related to enemy property.

The Bill was passed by the Rajya Sabha on 10 March 2017. The Bill, with amendments made in the Rajya Sabha, was passed by the Lok Sabha on 14 March 2017.

== Notable transactions ==
In 2019, the Government of India sold 44.3 million "enemy shares" of Wipro worth around ₹1,150 crore (US$165 million), under the Enemy Property Act. The transaction included shares representing a 0.62% equity stake originally owned by Azim Premji's elder brother, Faroukh Premji, who was a board member of Wipro between 1963 and 1965, before migrating to Pakistan in 1965.

== See also ==
- Custodian for Enemy Property for India, for the government takeover of property of rulers who migrated to Pakistan
- Transfer of Property Act 1882
- Political integration of India
- Central Wakf Council
- Evacuee Trust Property Board
- Privy Purse in India
