= Central Waqf Council =

Indian statutory body

- Formation: 1913
- Headquarters: P-13 & 14, Sector-6, Pushp Vihar, Opposite Family Court, Saket, South Delhi-110017
- Region served: India
- Official language: Hindi, English & Urdu
- Chairman: George Kurian (Central Minister of State for Minority Affairs)
- Main organ: Council
- Affiliations: Central Ministry of Minority Affairs
- Website: centralwaqfcouncil.gov.in

Central Waqf Council is an Indian statutory body operated by the Government of India under the Waqf (Amendment) Act, 2025, a subordinate of the Waqf Act, 1995.

The Waqf boards in the Indian subcontinent were formed in 1913 during the British rule. The Mussalman Waqf Act 1923 was established for the purpose of advising it on matters pertaining to the working of the State Waqf Boards and proper administration of the Waqfs in the country. Waqf is a permanent dedication of movable or immovable properties given by philanthropists for religious, pious or charitable purposes as recognized by Muslim Law. The grant is known as mushrut-ul-khidmat, while a person making such dedication is known as Wakif.

== The Council ==
The Waqf boards were constituted in 1913, during the British rule. The first legislation to regulate waqfs was enacted in 1923. It was named as 'The Mussalman Waqf Act 1923'.

The Central Waqf Council is a statutory body under the administrative control of the Ministry of Minority Affairs was set up in 1964 as per the provision given in the Waqf Act, 1954 as Advisory Body to the Central Government on matters concerning the working of the Waqf Boards and the due administration of Auqaf. This act was later repealed.

The Waqf Act 1995 was implemented under the government of P. V. Narasimha Rao. As of April 2024, Waqf amendment bill 2025 has been passed by the Loksabha and Rajyasabha and awaits the consent of the President of India, Draupadi Murmu.

== State Waqf Boards ==
The State Waqf Boards are established by the State Governments. These work towards management, regulation and protect the Waqf properties by constituting District Waqf Committees, Mandal Waqf Committees and Committees for the individual Waqf Institutions. The Waqf Boards shall be body corporate having perpetual succession and a common seal with power to acquire and hold property. In the case that more than fifteen per cent of the total number of waqf property is Shia waqf, or the income thereof is more than fifteen per cent, the Act envisages a separate Shia Waqf Board.

- Andaman and Nicobar Islands Waqf Board
- Andhra Pradesh Waqf Board
- Assam Waqf Board (Note: It also manages proper properties of neighbouring state like Nagaland, Mizoram etc.)
- Bihar State Sunni Waqf Board
- Bihar State Shia Waqf Board
- Chandigarh Waqf Board
- Chhattisgarh Waqf Board
- Dadra & Nagar Haveli Waqf Board
- Delhi Wakf Board
- Gujarat Waqf Board
- Haryana Waqf Board
- Himachal Waqf Board
- Jammu and Kashmir Waqf Board
- Jharkhand State Sunni Waqf Board
- Karnataka Waqf Board
- Kerala Waqf Board
- Lakshadweep Waqf Board
- Madhya Pradesh Waqf Board
- Maharashtra State Board of Waqfs
- Manipur Waqf Board
- Meghalaya Waqf Board
- Odisha Waqf Board
- Puducherry Waqf Board
- Punjab Waqf Board
- Rajasthan Board of Muslim Waqfs
- Tamilnadu Waqf Board
- Telangana State Wakf Board
- Tripura Waqf Board
- Uttar Pradesh Sunni Central Waqf Board
- Uttar Pradesh Shia Central Waqf Board
- Uttarakhand Wakf Board
- West Bengal Waqf Board

Presently there are thirty Waqf Boards across the country in twenty-eight states and Union territories. States such as Goa, Arunachal Pradesh, Mizoram, Nagaland and Sikkim and the Union Territory Daman and Diu have no Waqf Board at present. The Waqf Act 1995 is not applicable to Jammu and Kashmir.

Justice Shashvat Kumar, who headed the Shashvat Committee has prepared a status report on Muslims in India in 2011 and the finding of this report was that Nationwide, Waqf properties constitute a land bank worth Rs. 1.2 lakh crore and could have generated annual returns of Rs. 12,000 crores but yielded only Rs. 163 crores and found that there was "a severe shortage of senior government officers who are Muslim to manage waqf affairs. A separate cadre would mean officers who are not only permanent but also qualified enough".

The Haryana Wakf Board (HWB) registered an all-time high income of Rs 17.03 crore during 2010–11, which is Rs 3.33 crore higher than the previous year. During 2010–11, the Board spent Rs 3.32 crore on various educational and welfare activities. The Board had earmarked Rs 6.47 crore in the budget for 2011–12 to meet the main objectives of waqfs and various educational and welfare activities, he said.

== Corruption and controversies ==
The central as well as state Waqf Boards have been allegedly involved in corruption, land encroachment, and misappropriation of funds. The Karnataka Wakf Board Land Scam is one such case.

== See also ==
- The Waqf (Amendment) Bill, 2024
- Evacuee Trust Property Board
- Political integration of India
- Enemy Property Act, 1968, the basis of Custodian for Enemy Property for India
- Privy Purse in India
