= Privy purse in India =

Government payments to the ruling families of former Princely States (1947–71)

In India, a privy purse was a payment made to the ruling families of erstwhile princely states as part of their agreements to first integrate with India in 1947 after the independence of India, and later to merge their states in 1949, thereby ending their ruling rights.

The privy purses continued to be paid to the royal families until the 26th Amendment in 1971, by which all their privileges and allowances from the central government ceased to exist, which was implemented after a two-year legal battle.

In some individual cases, privy purses were continued for life for individuals who had held ruling powers before 1947; for instance, HH Maharani Sethu Lakshmi Bayi's allowance was reinstated after a prolonged legal battle, and lasted until she died in 1985.

== History ==
When the British Crown partitioned British India and granted independence to the new Dominions of India and Pakistan, more than a third of the subcontinent was still covered by princely states, with rulers whose position and status within the Indian Empire had varied. In 1947, there were more than 560 such princely states in India, over which the British Crown had suzerainty, but not sovereignty. In 1947, princely states, numbering 555, covered 48% area of pre-independent India and constituted 28% of its population. Relations with them were determined by subsidiary alliances and other treaties, establishing indirect rule. A protocollary system of gun salutes also determined the ranking of about 120 major states, including the princely states of Pakistan; most, however, were minor/petty 'non-salute states'. By the Indian Independence Act 1947, the Crown abandoned its suzerainty, leaving the rulers of the states free to choose to accede either to India or to Pakistan or to remain fully independent. Most had been so dependent on the Government of India that they had little choice but accession. By the eve of independence, most of the princely states had signed instruments of accession to India, and only one to Pakistan. Only a few states held out for complete independence after the British left India. Due to the diplomacy of Vallabhbhai Patel and V. P. Menon, Travancore, Bhopal and Jodhpur signed the instruments of accession before 15 August 1947. After independence, many states vacillated, including Jammu and Kashmir, Junagadh and Hyderabad, which were integrated later.

The instruments of accession only required the states to cede defence, communications, and foreign relations to India. Democratic institutions were introduced in these states, and it was only in 1949 that they were fully merged with India to form new states. Thus, Travancore, and Cochin merged into India and formed the new state of Travancore-Cochin. Although the royal families had been allowed to retain large sums of money as their privy purse in 1947; in 1949, with the states and its revenues being entirely taken over by the Government of India, it was the Indian Government that provided the rulers and their families with privy purses that were determined by several factors such as the state's revenue, whether the state had been ranked as a salute state under the British Raj or not, antiquity of the dynasty, and so on. Dewan Jarmani Dass of Kapurthala says:

Thus the rulers surrendered their sovereignty and as a quid pro quo they were granted handsome Privy Purses and other privileges.

As defined from 1949 under Article 291 of the Indian Constitution, a privy purse would be a fixed, tax-free sum guaranteed to the former princely rulers and their successors. The sum was intended to cover all expenses of the former ruling families, including those incurred for religious and other ceremonies, and would be charged on the Consolidated Fund of India. With India remaining a member of the sterling area post-independence, and with the Indian rupee remaining pegged to the British pound sterling, the privy-purse payments constituted a significant outlay of government funds.

== Recipients and amounts ==
The privy purses were determined by several factors. Minor feudatories of the erstwhile princely states received whatever little allowances the princely governments had been providing them. For the 565 princely states, privy purses ranged from ₹ 5,000 per annum to amounts in millions. About 102 privy purses were of more than a ₹ 100,000 with an upper ceiling of ₹ 200,000 for all except 11 states. These eleven princely states in India were provided with privy purses of ₹ 1,000,000 and above (worth 8,898 oz of gold): Hyderabad, Mysore, Travancore, Baroda, Jaipur, Patiala, Nawanagar, Bhavnagar State, Rewa district, Bhopal and Kolhapur. While certain amounts were guaranteed for the time being, it was liable to be reduced soon after due to deflation crisis in 1960s. Thus, Hyderabad, which received initially a privy purse of ₹ 4,285,714, was, a few years later, guaranteed ₹ 2,000,000 purse. Other titular rulers of princely states, such as those of the Royal House of Rampur, among others, received a privy purse as well. The Government of India also, generally, reduced the allowances with every succession in the family.

== Abolition ==
A motion to abolish the privy purses, and the official recognition of the titles, was originally brought before the Parliament in 1970 and passed in the Lok Sabha, but failed by one vote to reach the required two-thirds majority in the Rajya Sabha, with 149 voting for and 75 against.

On 6 September 1970, the President of India passed a laconic order in respect of each of the rulers of former Indian states. In exercise of the power vested in him under Article 366(22) of the constitution, the President directed that with effect from the date of his order, all rulers ceased to be recognised as rulers. That resulted in the immediate termination of the privy purses received by the rulers, and the discontinuance of their personal privileges. Writ petitions under Article 32 of the constitution were filed by some of the rulers as test cases to question the orders. The Supreme Court ruled in favour of the rulers.

It was again proposed before Parliament in 1971, and was successfully passed as the 26th Amendment to the Constitution of India in 1971. The then Prime Minister Indira Gandhi argued for the abolition based on equal rights for all citizens and the need to reduce the government's revenue deficit.

The amendment effectively derecognized the existing titles:

the Prince, Chief or other person who, at any time before the commencement of the Constitution (Twenty-sixth Amendment) Act, 1971, was recognised by the President as the Ruler of an Indian State or any person who, at any time before such commencement, was recognised by the President as the successor of such Ruler shall, on and from such commencement, cease to be recognised as such Ruler or the successor of such Ruler.

== Aftermath ==
The end of privy purse finally ended all the entitlements and special status of former rulers.

Many of the former royalty tried to protest against the abolition of the privy purses, primarily through campaigns to contest seats in the Lok Sabha elections of 1971. This included Mansoor Ali Khan Pataudi, the last and former Nawab of Pataudi, who contested from Gurgaon. Mansoor contested as a candidate for the Vishal Haryana Party, but received barely 5% of the vote in a two-way contest. Vijaya Raje Scindia and her son, Madhav Rao Scindia, however, won in the 1971 Lok Sabha polls.

Despite the attempts by the former royals to use the titles such as maharaja (king) or prince, etc. over the years, the courts in India have "repeatedly held that usage of royal titles violates the Constitution, specifically Articles 14, 18, and 363A, which guarantee equality, abolish titles, and end recognition of princely privileges."

== See also ==
- Political integration of India
- Custodian for Enemy Property for India, for the government takeover of property of rulers who migrated to Pakistan
- Enemy Property Act, 1968, basis of Custodian for Enemy Property for India
- Central Waqf Council, in India for Muslim properties
- Evacuee Trust Property Board, in Pakistan for Hindu and Sikh properties
