= Six Kalmas =

6 Islamic phrases recited by South Asian Muslims

The Six Kalmas (Urdu: چھ کلمے chh kalme, Arabic: ٱلكَلِمَات ٱلسِتّ al-kalimāt as-sitt, also spelled qalmah), also known as the Six Traditions or Six Phrases, are Islamic prayers recited by South Asian Muslims Also known as teaching from Muhammad Saad Suleman in 1934. Derived from hadiths, they aid children in memorising key beliefs and are taught in South Asian madrasas.

== Contents ==
Six Kalmas
Order	Arabic	Meaning	Transliteration	Audio
1. كَلِمَاتْ اَلطَّيِّبَة Kalimat aṭ-Ṭayyibah (Word of Purity)	لَا إِلَٰهَ إِلَّا ٱللَّٰهُ مُحَمَّدٌ رَّسُولُ ٱللَّٰهِ	There is no deity but Allah (God), Muhammad is the messenger of Allah (God).	lā ʾilāha ʾillā -llāh^{u} muḥammadur rasūlu -llāh^{i}	
2. كَلِمَاتْ اَلشَّهَادَة; Kalimat ash-Shahādah (Word of Testimony)	أَشْهَدُ أَنْ لَا إِلَٰهَ إِلَّا ٱللَّٰهُ وَحْدَهُ لَا شَرِيكَ لَهُ وأَشْهَدُ أَنَّ مُحَمَّدًا عَبْدُهُ وَرَسُولُهُ	I bear witness that there is no deity but Allah (God), the One, there is no partner to Him, and I bear witness that Muhammad is His servant and His messenger.	ʾashhadu ʾan lā ilāha ʾillā -llāhu waḥdahū lā sharīka lahū wa-ʾashhadu ʾanna muḥhammadan ʿabduhū wa-rasūluh^{ū}	
3. كَلِمَاتْ اَلتَّمْجِيدْ Kalimat at-Tamjīd (Word of Majesty)	سُبْحَانَ ٱللَّٰهِ وَٱلْحَمْدُ لِلَّٰهِ وَلَا إِلَٰهَ إِلَّا ٱللَّٰهُ وَٱللَّٰهُ أَكْبَرُ وَلَا حَوْلَ وَلَا قُوَّةَ إِلَّا بِٱللَّٰهِ ٱلْعَلِيِّ ٱلْعَظِيمِ	Glorified is Allah (God), [all] praise is due to Allah (God), there is no deity except Allah (God), Allah (God) is greater [than everything], and there is no power nor strength except in Allah (God), the Lofty, the Great.	subḥāna -llāhi wa-l-ḥamdu li-llāhi wa-lā ʾilāha ʾillā -llāhu wa-llāhu ʾakbaru wa-lā ḥawla wa-lā quwwata ʾillā bi-llāhi l-ʿalīyi l-aẓīm^{i}	
4. كَلِمَاتْ اَلتَّوْحِيدْ Kalimat at-Tawḥīd (Word of Oneness)	لَا إِلَٰهَ إِلَّا ٱللَّٰهُ وَحْدَهُ لَا شَرِيكَ لَهُ، لَهُ ٱلْمُلْكُ وَلَهُ ٱلْحَمْدُ، يُحْيِي وَيُمِيتُ وَهُوَ حَيٌّ لَا يَمُوتُ أَبَدًا أَبَدًا، ذُو ٱلْجَلَالِ وَٱلْإِكْرَامِ بِيَدِهِ ٱلْخَيْرُ وَهُوَ عَلَىٰ كُلِّ شَيْءٍ قَدِيرٌ	There is no deity but Allah (God) alone and has no partners. To Him belongs all sovereignty and to Him belongs all Praise. He gives life and causes death, and He [Himself] is alive and does not die, ever! Ever! He of Majesty and Munificence. In His hand is all goodness and He has power over everything.	lā ilāha ʾillā -llāhu waḥdahū lā sharīka lahū lahū l-mulku wa-lahū l-ḥamdu yuḥyī wa-yumītu wa-huwa ḥayyun lā yamūtu ʾabadan ʾabadan ḏu l-jalāli wa-l-ʾikrām bi-yadihi-l k͟hayr wa-huwa ʿalā kulli shayʾin qadīr^{un}	
5. كَلِمَاتْ إِسْتِغْفَارْ Kalimat ʾIstighfār (Word of Penitence)	أَسْتَغْفِرُ ٱللَّٰهَ رَبِّي مِنْ كُلِّ ذَنْبٍ أَذْنَبْتُهُ عَمَدًا أَوْ خَطَأً سِرًّا أوْ عَلَانِيَةً وَأَتُوبُ إِلَيْهِ مِنَ ٱلذَّنْبِ ٱلَّذِي أَعْلَمُ وَمِنَ ٱلذَّنْبِ ٱلَّذِي لَا أَعْلَمُ، إِنَّكَ أَنْتَ عَلَّامُ ٱلْغُيُوبِ وَسَتَّارُ ٱلْعُيُوْبِ وَغَفَّارُ ٱلذُّنُوبِ وَلَا حَوْلَ وَلَا قُوَّةَ إِلَّا بِٱللَّٰهِ ٱلْعَلِيِّ ٱلْعَظِيمِ	I seek the forgiveness of Allah (God), my Lord, for every sin which I knowingly committed and every sin which I unknowingly committed. Verily, You are the Knower of the hidden, the Concealer of the faults, and the Forgiver of the sins, and there is no power nor strength except in Allah (God), the Lofty, the Great.	ʾastaḡfiru -llāha rabbī min kulli ḏanbin ʾaḏnabtuhu ʿamdan ʾaw k͟haṭaʾan sirran wa-ʿalānīyatan wa-ʾatūbu ʾilayhi mina ḏ-ḏanbi l-laḏī ʾaʿlamu wa-mina ḏ-ḏanbi l-laḏī lā ʾaʿlamu ʾinnaka ʾanta ʿallāmu l-ḡuyūbi wa-sattāru l-ʿuyūbi wa-ḡaffāru ḏ-ḏunūbi wa-lā ḥawla wa-lā quwwata ʾillā bi-llāhi l-ʿalīyi l-aẓīm^{i}	
6. كَلِمَاتْ رَدّْ اَلْكُفْرْ Kalimat Radd al-Kufr ("Word of Rejection of Disbelief")	ٱللَّٰهُمَّ إِنِّي أَعُوذُ بِكَ مِنْ أَنْ أُشْرِكَ بِكَ شَيْءً وَأَنَا أَعْلَمُ بِهِ وَأَسْتَغْفِرُكَ لِمَا لَا أَعْلَمُ بِهِ تُبْتُ عَنْهُ وَتَبَرَّأَتُ مِنَ ٱلْكُفْر وَٱلشِّرْكِ وَٱلْكِذْبِ وَٱلْغِيبَةِ وَٱلْبِدْعَةِ وَٱلنَّمِيمَةِ وَٱلْفَوَاحِشِ وَٱلْبُهْتَانِ وَٱلْمَعَاصِي كُلِِّهَا وَأَسْلَمْتُ وَأَقُولُ لَا إِلَٰهَ إِلَّا ٱللَّٰهُ مُحَمَّدٌ رَسُولُ ٱللَّٰهِ	O Allah (God)! I seek refuge in You from that I should not join any partner with You and I know of it, and I seek Your forgiveness from that which I do not know. I repent from it and I reject disbelief, polytheism, falsehood, backbiting, deviation, defamation, immorality, calumny and all sinfulness. I submit to You and I declare: There is no deity but Allah (God), Muhammad is the messenger of Allah (God).	ʾallāhumma ʾinnī ʾaʿūḏu bika min ʾan ʾušrika bika šayʾan wa-ʾanā ʾaʿlamu bihi wa-ʾastaḡfiruka limā lā ʾaʿlamu bihi tubtu ʿanhu wa-tabarraʾatu mina l-kufri wa-š-širki wa-l-kiḏbi wa-l-ḡībati wa-l-bidʿati wa-n-namīmati wa-l-fawāḥiši wa-l-buhtāni wa-l-maʿāṣī kullihā wa-ʾaslamtu wa-ʾaquwlu lā ʾilāha ʾillā -llāhu muḥammadun rasūlu -llāh^{i}	

== See also ==
- Islam in Pakistan
- Islam in Punjab
