= Baisaran Valley =

Valley in Jammu and Kashmir, India

- Baisaran Meadow
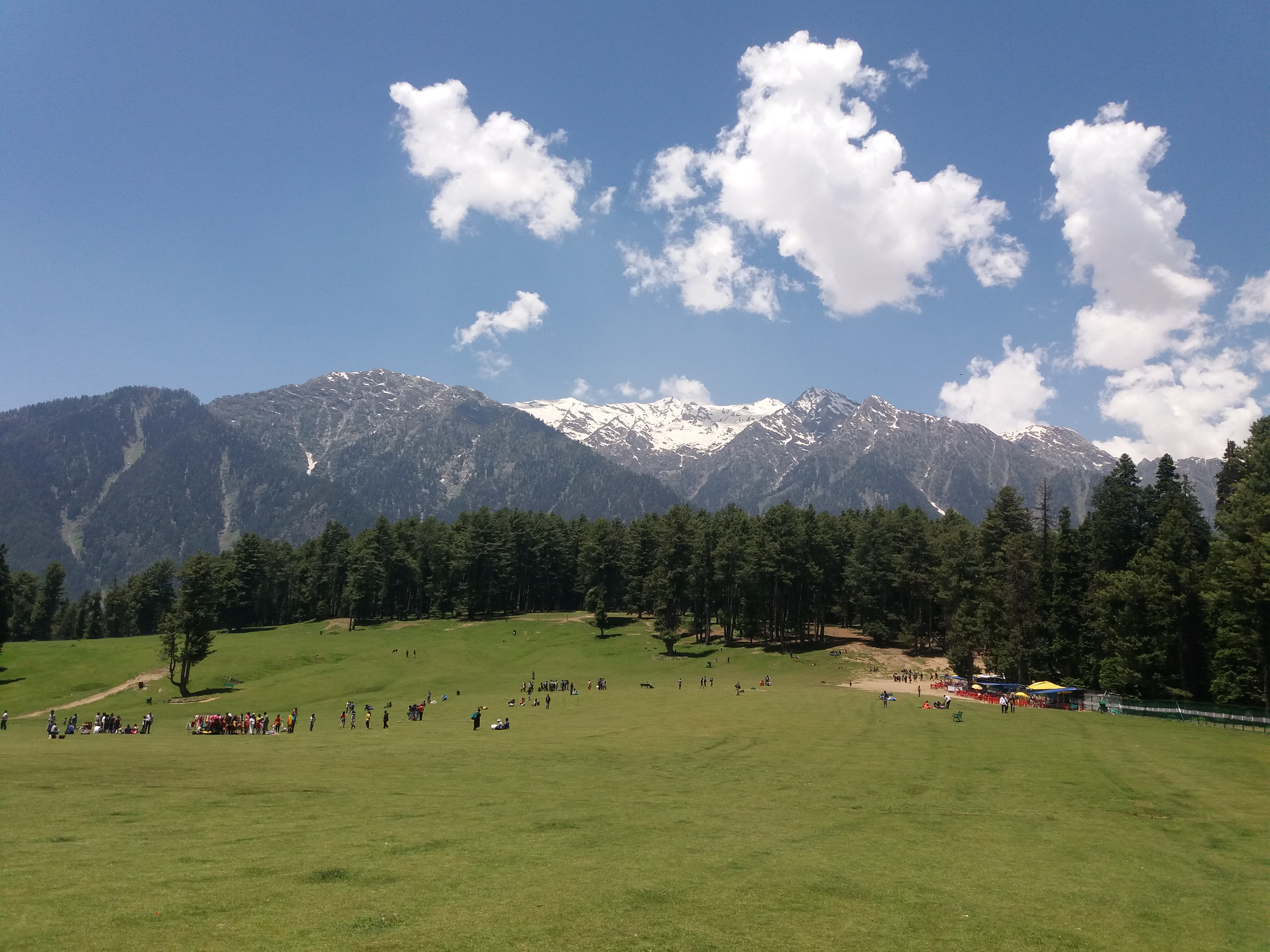
- Baisaran Valley in 2017
- Floor elevation: 8,000 ft (2,400 m)

Geography
- Country: India
- State/Province: Jammu & Kashmir
- District: Anantnag, Kashmir
- Borders on: Sind Valley; Lidder Valley
- Coordinates: 34°00′11″N 75°20′02″E
- Mountain range: Himalayan
- River: Lidder River
- Interactive map of Baisaran Valley

Baisaran Valley is a meadow located about 5–7 km from Pahalgam in the Anantnag district of the Kashmir Valley of Jammu and Kashmir, India. Situated at an altitude of around 8,000 feet (2,400 m), it is surrounded by dense pine forests and the Pir Panjal range.

== Incidents ==
On 22 April 2025, a terrorist attack occurred in Baisaran meadow of India's Kashmir, where terrorists rounded up and opened fire on tourists, mainly targeting Hindus, resulting in 26 deaths and more than 20 injuries. The attack, claimed by The Resistance Front, a proxy of the terrorism group, Lashkar-e-Taiba, based in Pakistan, targeted tourists in a crowded area, exploiting Baisaran's seclusion. The area is accessible only by foot or pony which delayed rescue efforts. Security forces launched a counter-terrorism operation, and the remaining tourists were evacuated from the region. In response to the incident, The Indian government suspended the Indus Water Treaty, rescinded visas of Pakistan nationals, and ordered those in the country to leave within 48 hours.
