= Transfer of Property Act, 1882 =

Transfer of property right in India

Imperial Legislative Council
- Long title: An Act to amend the law relating to the Transfer of Property by act of parties.
- Citation: Act No. 4 of 1882
- Territorial extent: Union of India
- Enacted: 17 February 1882
- Commenced: 1 July 1882

Legislative history
- Introduced by: Whitley Stokes
- First reading: 1877
- Second reading: 1882
- Status: In force

The Transfer of Property Act, 1882 is an Indian legislation which regulates the transfer of property in India. It contains specific provisions regarding what constitutes a transfer and the conditions attached to it. It came into force on 1 July 1882.

According to the Act, 'transfer of property' means an act by which a person conveys the property to one or more persons, or himself and one or more other persons. The act of transfer may be done in the present or for the future. The person may include an individual, company or association or body of individuals, and any kind of property may be transferred, including the transfer of immovable property.

== Interpretation of "property" ==
Property is broadly classified into the following categories:

1. Immovable Property (excluding standing timber, growing crops, and grass)
2. Movable Property (such as watches, timbers)

The Interpretation of the Act, says "Immovable property does not include standing timber, growing crops or grass". Section 3(26) of the General Clauses Act, 1897 states that " immovable property" shall include land, benefits to arise out of the land, and things attached to the earth, or permanently fastened to anything attached to the earth. A similar definition is provided by the Registration Act, 1908 under section 2(6):

"immovable property" includes land, buildings, hereditary allowances, rights to ways, lights, ferries, fisheries or any other benefit to arise out of the land, and things attached to the earth or permanently fastened to anything which is attached to the earth, but not standing timber, growing crops nor grass.

A transfer of property passes forthwith to the transferee all the interest which the transferor is then capable of passing in the property unless a different intention is expressed or implied.

According to Section 43 of the Transfer of Property Act 1882, in case a person either fraudulently or erroneously represents that he is authorized to transfer certain immovable property and does some acts to transfer such property for consideration, then such a transfer will continue to operate in future. It will operate on any interest which the transferor may acquire in such property.

This will be at the option of the transferee and can be done during the time during which the contract of transfer exists. As per this rule, the rights of the bona fide transferee, who has no notice of the earlier transfer or of the option, are protected. This rule embodies a rule of estoppel i.e. a person who makes a representation cannot later on go against it.

Every person, who is competent to contract, is competent to transfer property, which can be transferred in whole or in part. He should be entitled to the transferable property, or authorized to dispose of transferable property which is not his own. The right may be either absolute or conditional, and the property may be movable or immovable, present or future. Such a transfer can be made orally unless a transfer in writing is specifically required under any law.

Even when a person is mentally competent, but physically unable to sign any contract, the property lawyer hired by him, can do that with the help of a power of attorney.

According to Section 6 of the Transfer of Property Act, the property of any kind may be transferred. The person insisting non-transferability must prove the existence of some law or custom which restricts the right of transfer. Unless there is some legal restriction preventing the transfer, the owner of the property may transfer it. However, in some cases, there may be a transfer of property by an unauthorized person who subsequently acquires an interest in such property.

In case the property is transferred subject to the condition which absolutely restrains the transferee from parting with or disposing of his interest in the property, the condition is void. The only exception is in the case of a lease where the condition is for the benefit of the lessor or those claiming under him. Generally, only the person having interest in the property is authorized to transfer his interest in the property and can pass on the proper title to any other person.

The rights of the transferees will not be adversely affected, provided: they acted in good faith; the property was acquired for a consideration, and the transferees had acted without notice of the defect in the title of the transferor.

These conditions must be satisfied :

There must be a representation by the transferor that he has authority to transfer the immovable property. The representation shouldn't be either fraudulent or erroneous. The transferee must act on the representation in good faith. The transfer should be done for a consideration. The transferor should subsequently acquire some interest in the property he had agreed to transfer. The transferee may have the option to acquire the interest which the transferor subsequently acquires.

== Related legislation ==
There are 18 other statutes that are primarily concerned with Property Law, or significantly matter to Property Law, as listed below:

1. Trusts Act, 1882
2. Specific Relief Act, 1908
3. Easements Act, 1882
4. Registration Act, 1908
5. Stamp Act, 1899
6. U.P. Stamp Act, 2008
7. Limitation Act, 1963
8. General Clauses Act, 1897
9. Evidence Act, 1872
10. Succession Act, 1925
11. Partition Act, 1893
12. Presidency-Towns Insolvency Act, 1909
13. Provincial Insolvency Act, 1920
14. Recovery of Debts Due to Banks and Financial Institutions Act, 1993
15. Securitisation and Reconstruction of Financial Assets and Enforcement of Security Interest act, 2002
16. Contract Act, 1872
17. Sale of Goods Act, 1930
18. Negotiable Instruments Act, 1881
19. Enemy Property Act.
