= Tourism in Jammu and Kashmir =

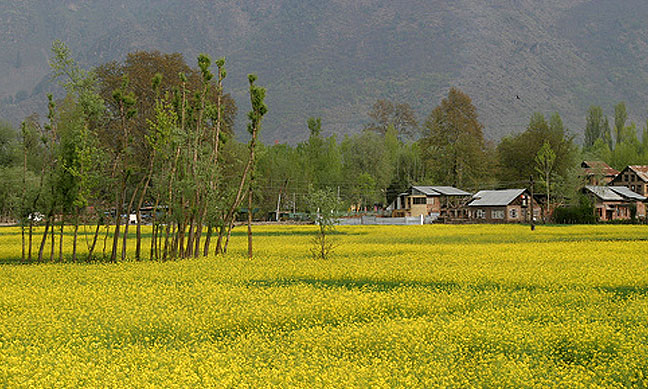
Kashmir Valley in the spring

Jammu and Kashmir attracts tourists for its diverse landscape, cultures and weather as well as for adventure activities in the Himalayas such as skiing, mountaineering, hiking, trekking and camping. Some major tourist attractions in Jammu and Kashmir are Katra, Patnitop, Buddha Amarnath and Mughal Gardens, Gulmarg, Pahalgam, Bhaderwah, Devigol Bunjwah, Dal Lake, Sonamarg and Paddar. Every year, thousands of Hindu pilgrims visit holy shrines of Vaishno Devi and Amarnath which has had a significant impact on the state's economy.

Jammu Division is one of the top tourist destinations of India. Gulmarg, one of the most popular ski resort destinations in India, is also home to the world's highest green golf course. Tourism has declined in the past thirty years.

Jammu and Kashmir also has flower gardens and apple orchards. It also attracts tourists for its handicrafts and the Basohli Shawls, Kashmiri shawls.

Following the abrogation of Article 370 in 2019, Jammu and Kashmir has seen a sharp revival in tourism, driven by improved security and infrastructure development under the Swadesh Darshan Scheme. As per data presented in the Lok Sabha on 21 July 2025, domestic tourist visits rose from 25.19 lakh in 2020 to over 2.35 crore in 2024. International arrivals also rebounded from 1,650 in 2021 to 65,452 in 2024, reflecting renewed global confidence. The surge in tourist footfall highlights the region’s growing stability and reintegration into India's mainstream tourism map.

During January–June 2025, Jammu and Kashmir witnessed over 95 lakh domestic tourist visits (DTVs) and 19,570 foreign tourist visits (FTVs), according to data shared by Union Tourism Minister Gajendra Singh Shekhawat. The figures reflect sustained tourist interest despite isolated security incidents.

While no formal economic impact assessment was conducted following the April 2025 Pahalgam terror attack, the steady growth in tourism numbers—from 25 lakh DTVs in 2020 to over 2.35 crore in 2024—indicates a broader return to normalcy and confidence in the region’s safety and infrastructure. The Ministry of Tourism continues to promote Jammu and Kashmir as a priority destination under various central schemes and campaigns.

== Major attractions in North Kashmir ==
North Kashmir is a region in the Indian-administered union territory of Jammu and Kashmir, renowned for its stunning landscapes, rich cultural heritage, and natural beauty. The first-ever map of tourism in Jammu and Kashmir was published in Konnect Magazine and later shared on the official Twitter handle of Jammu and Kashmir Tourism. The region is predominantly located in the Himalayan mountains, offering picturesque vistas of snow-capped peaks, lush valleys, and serene lakes. Key attractions include Gulmarg, a popular hill station known for its expansive meadows, the Gulmarg Gondola (one of the highest cable cars in the world), and winter sports such as skiing. Kupwara, often referred to as "Kashmir's Switzerland," features scenic spots like Lolab Valley, Rishipathri Lake, and lush forests, making it an ideal destination for nature enthusiasts. The historic town of Baramulla offers ancient temples, the vast Wular Lake (one of Asia's largest freshwater lakes), and picturesque views along the Jhelum River. Pahalgam, while technically in South Kashmir, is frequently included in the region’s travel circuit, known for attractions like Betaab Valley, Aru Valley, and Baisaran Hills. North Kashmir's combination of natural beauty, adventure opportunities, and cultural significance makes it a popular destination for travelers.

=== Bangus Valley ===
Between the green hills, streams, and meadows lie a valley in Jammu and Kashmir's Kupwara where the cattle run wild, birds sing lullabies through the day. The place is named Bangus Valley. According to a report, the valley is located nearly 10,000 meters above sea level (MSL). The Bangus Valley is located in Kupwara district of North Kashmir. It is situated to the West of Handwara town along the Mawri River within the Handwara sub-district. district Kupwara. The term Bangus comes from Sanskrit word Van (Forest) and gus (grass).

The valley is nearly 130 km from Srinagar and is situated on the northwestern border of Tehsil Handwara in Kupwara. Divided into two parts-Bod Bungus (Big Bungus) and Lokut Bungus (Small Bungus) the valley spans over an area of 300 km^{2}. Bangus is about 150 kilometres (93 miles) from Srinagar at an altitude of 10,000 feet (3,000 m). The principal valley is locally known as "Boud Bangus" (Big Bangus) and has an estimated area of about 300 square kilometers. It consists of a linear elliptical bowl aligned along the east–west axis and is surrounded by Rajwar and Mawar in the east, Shamasbury and Dajlungun Mountains in the west and Chowkibal and Karnah Guli in the north. It is surrounded by the Shamsbery mountain range and the Leepa Valley, according to the report. After years of planning, Bangus was recently made motorable via the Mawer route while work is in full swing on the Chowkibal and Rajwar routes.

Its high altitude and unpredictable weather conditions were a huge obstacle but the administration has materialized this project in a short span of time. The Centre recognised 75 new destinations in the Union Territory for tourism this year. Under the Jal Jeevan Mission and 'Har Ghar Nal Say Jal Mission, the water scarcity days of Kupwara are over. The district constructed 400 Amrit Sarovar in 2022 to support the safe drinking water initiative of the government. The Kupwara District Administration and Tourism Department organized a two-day Bangus Mela earlier this year in August. The event focused on the traditions and culture of the region. Music artists, singers, Kashmiri Rowfdancers, and school report said. children organized shows for the audience. Pony wallas also put up a special segment with the ponies displaying riding tricks and offering salami to the spectators. The festival folk songs were played nonstop which added to the upbeat atmosphere of the usually quiet valley.

The Lolab Bangus Drang yari Development Authority (LRDDA) installed night-stay tents for tourists. The meadows and slopes of Bungus are enveloped in flowers and medicinal plants such as Macrotima Benthami (gew zaban), Saussurea Sacra (Jugi pedshah), and Aconitum Heterophylleum (patrees). Recently a new species of flowering medicinal plant 'Swertia Kashmirensis' has been discovered in Bungus. The fauna in Bungus includes musk deer, antelope, snow leopards, brown and black bears, monkeys, and red foxes. The bird species include pheasants, tragopan, black partridge, bush quail, and wildfowl. Until two years ago, the valley was not an easy destination due to its proximity to the LoC (5 km) but the reinstallation of better security systems after the abrogation of Article 370, has helped to increase the faith of explorers who earlier did not find it safe to visit. Previously, visitors had to obtain permits from the District Magistrate to trek and camp but with the ripple effect of the political developments has been so effective that all such restrictions have now been lifted.

As of 2 June 2022, the road connectivity from Handwara side via Mawer is complete. People can take only small cars to Bangus because work on macdamisation is still going on. Vehicles are available on rent basis from Handwara market. Night stay tents are also available there. There are three routes to visit this place. The least distance route from Handwara via Reshwari Mawer. The second route is also from Handwara but via Rajwar and is suitable for trekking only. The third route from Kupwara via Chowkibal.

=== Bhadrakali Mandir ===
An ancient idol of Mata Bhadrakali was reinstalled at a temple in Jammu and Kashmir's Kupwara district years after it was brought back from Jammu. The ancient temple at Bhadrakali Village in Handwara wore a festive look as the original idol of the presiding deity, Maa Bhadrakali, was restored to its original abode in a simple ceremony in March 2019. The idol was stolen in 1981 was subsequently recovered and kept in Jammu since 1999. It is believed that during the exodus of Pandits from Handwara, the idol was left behind in the house of Pandit Jaggernath. The nearest airport is Sheikh ul-Alam International Airport in Srinagar located 78.8 kilometers from Handwara. Handwara is not yet connected to railways. The nearest railway station is Baramulla railway station located 30 kilometers from Handwara. Handwara is well-connected with roads and highways. The NH 701 passes through Handwara alongside other intra-town roads.

=== Tithwal ===
Tithwal is a small border village about 171 km from Srinagar. After a scenic drive through Sopore, Kupwara and on to Tangdhar, one arrives at Tithwal. Another 80 km and on comes Sharda Peeth. Beyond the Sadhna top lies the Karnah valley along the river Kishan-Ganga and at the edge of it is the last village of North-West Kashmir, Tithwal. At 10600 feet, Sadhna pass nested on the mighty Shamshabari mountain ranges originally known as Nastachun Pass is the only access to the Karnah, Neelam and Leepa valley. In the olden days, Tithwal was the trading hub where hundreds of shops lined up selling ghee, honey and walnut kernels. Those commodities would reach Tithwal from Karnah, Leepa and Neelam valleys. To immerse fully into the surroundings, the Forest Department of J&K, like at many other places, have built Kail and Deodar huts. To reach Tithwal one has to take NH1 from Airport road. After travelling for 45 km on NH1 take a right turn to Sangrama – Sopore road and then turn left onto Sopore – Kupwara road and then follow NH 701 to reach Tithwal.

=== Ancient Stupa Parihaspora ===
Paraspore or Paraspur is a small town 22 km North-West of Srinagar in the Kashmir Valley. It was built on a plateau above the Jhelum River by Lalitaditya Muktapida. Parihaspur lost its status as a capital after Lalitaditya's death. His son moved the royal residence. The Jhelum River is to the northeast of Parihaspur as it meets the Sind Nallah at Shadpur sangam. In the past this confluence of the rivers occurred closer to Parihaspur. To reach Paraspore one has to head southwest on Airport Road, make a U-turn to hit NH1. Continue straight on NH1 past M.R. Brand for 55 km and turn left onto Baramula-Gulmarg road and stay on it for 1.2 km to reach the destination.

=== Detha Mandir ===
The lord Detha temple is situated in a small village about 105 km from Srinagar. To reach this temple, one must take a long drive moving from Srinagar to Pattan and onwards to Uri. The century-old map is the key to understanding the wealth of Hindu heritage and culture that Kashmir was once renowned for. One of the most noted monuments documented by many archaeologists, historians and architects is the Datta Mandir located at Banihal near Uri. To reach Detha Mandir one has to head Southwest on Airport Road, make a U-turn to hit NH1and drive for 3.8 km followed by a slight left onto NH1. After a drive of 15 km on NH1 past M.R. Brand, turn left after 1.2 km on to NH1. Stay on this road for 89 km until you reach Datta Temple, Uri.

=== Gurudwara Thara Sahib, Baramulla ===
Baramulla is a boulevard surrounded by breathtaking rice fields and meadows. Baramulla is about 55 km from Srinagar. This historic shrine is 8 km away from Baramulla town and 01 km on Baramulla – Srinagar National highway. According to local history, a faqir named Balol and his disciples met Guru Sahib near Kalampura village. They discussed religious discourses with Guru Ji. At the request of people, Guru Ji dug out a fresh water chisma. In the last years of 19th century, a plate form (Thara) 20 x 25 ft. was constructed by S. Matwal Singh Sahni and other Gur Sikhs. Chief Khalsa Dewan Amritsar intellectuals like Bhai Vir Singh, S. Damodar Singh Engineer, S. Narinder Singh and others also visited this place and constructed a Gurdwara in 1928-1931 A.D. The Gurdwara is managed by Gurdwara Parbandhak Committee, Baramulla. To reach Gurudwara Thara Sahib one has to Head Southwest on Airport Road, make a U-turn to hit NH1and drive for 3.8 km followed by a slight left onto NH1. After a drive of 15 km on NH1 past M.R. Brand, turn left after 1.2 km on to NH1. Continue straight for 32 km passing Zehra Crossing and then turn left onto Singhpora-Delina Road. After driving for 2.9 km, turn right onto Singhpora-Kalampora Road for 260mtrs arriving at the destination

== Major attractions in Jammu Kashmir ==
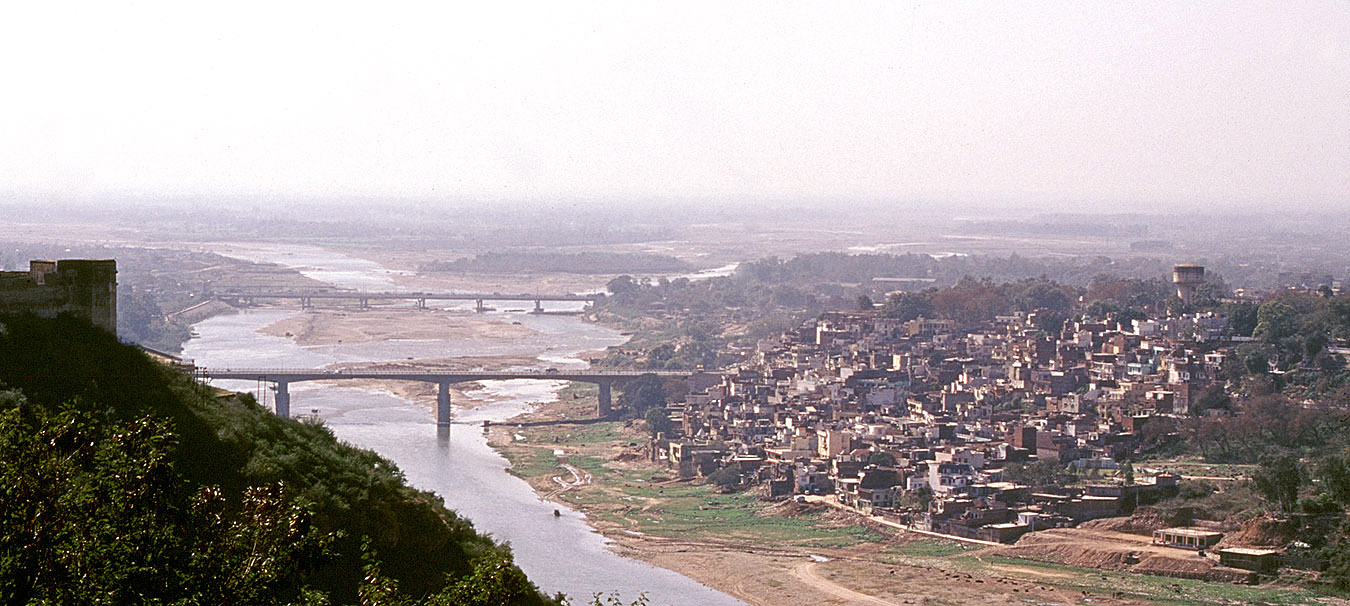
View of Jammu city and Tawi river

Tourism is the largest industry in Jammu city. It is also a focal point for the pilgrims going to Vaishno Devi and Kashmir valley as it is second last railway terminal in North India. All the routes leading to Kashmir, Poonch, Doda and Laddakh start from Jammu city. So throughout the year, the city remains full of people from all the parts of India. Places of interest include old historic palaces like Mubarak Mandi Palace, Purani Mandi, Rani Park, Amar Mahal, Bahu Fort, Raghunath Temple, Ranbireshwar Temple, Karbala, Peer Meetha, Old city.

=== Devigol ===
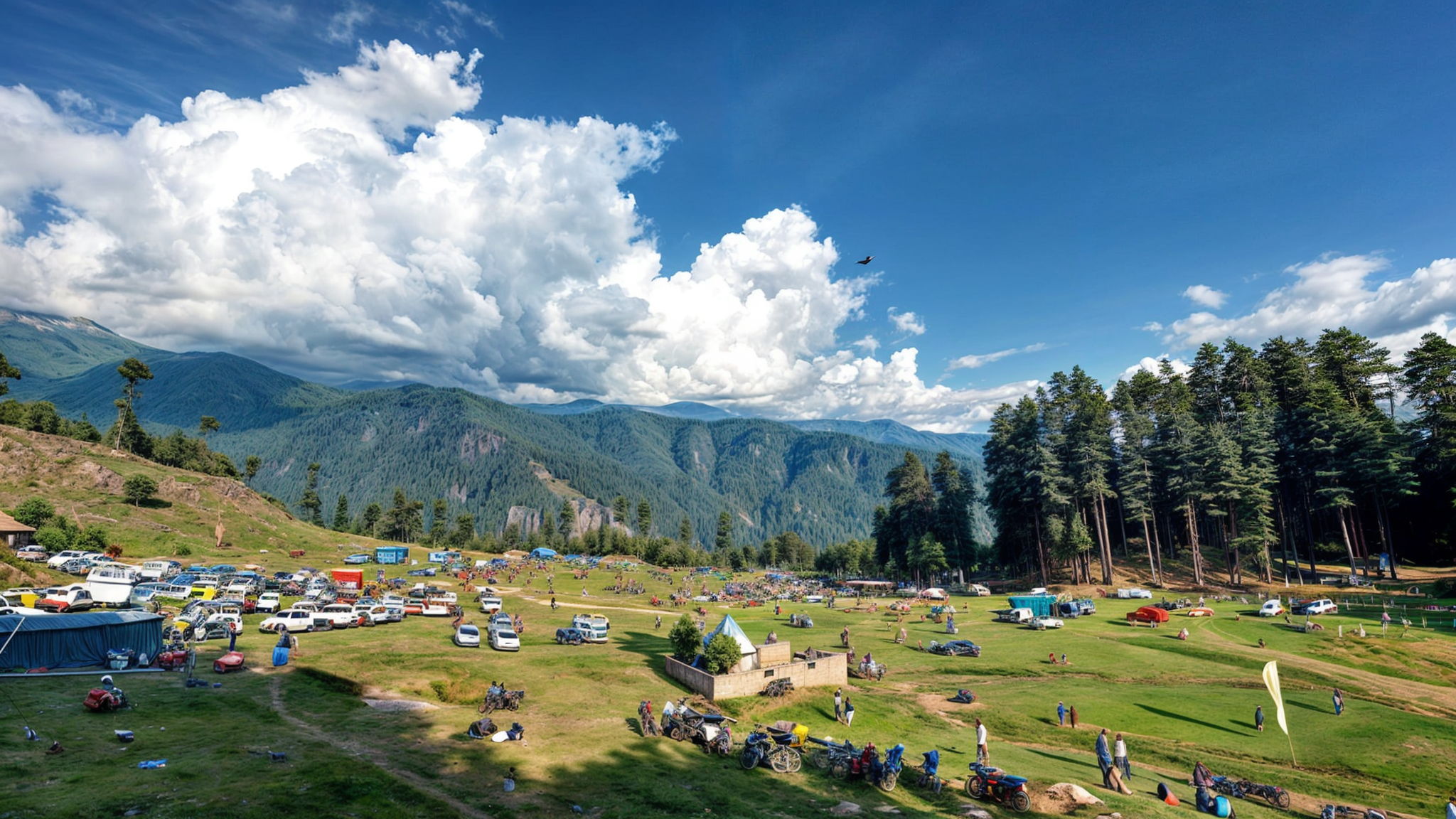
View of Devigol Bunjwah district Kishtwar

Padras also known as devigol , And Dhal Padran is a small cricket ground in devigol, Devigol is a hill station and popular tourist destination in Patnazi Village, Bunjwah, Kishtwar district in the Indian union territory of Jammu and Kashmir.

The Devigol Festival is held there annually.

=== Pahalgam ===
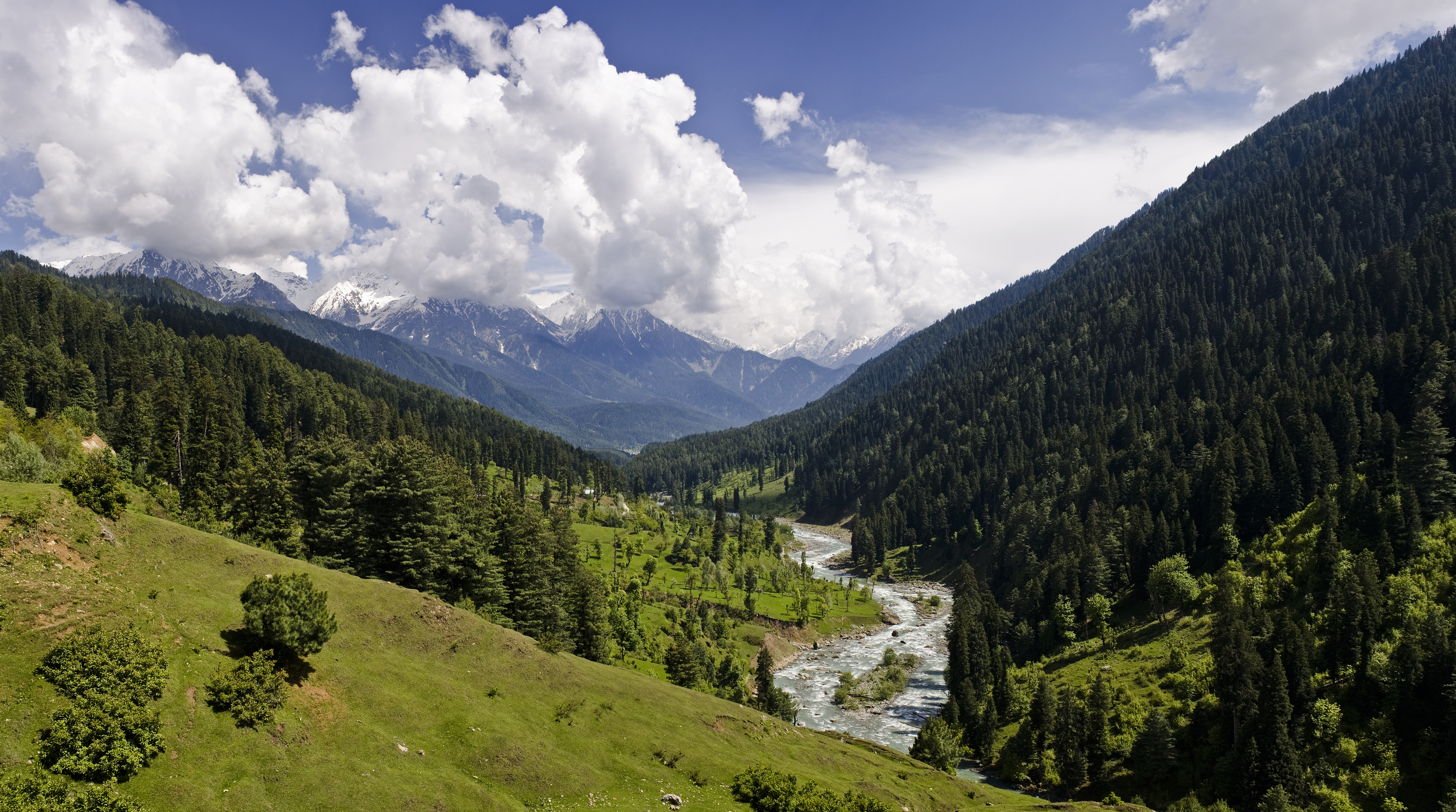
View of the Lidder Valley at Pahalgam

Pahalgam (Urdu pronunciation: [pɛɦɛlɡɑːm]) or Pahalgom (Kashmiri pronunciation: [pəhəlʲɡoːm]) is a town in Anantnag district of the Indian union territory of Jammu and Kashmir. It is located on the banks of Lidder River at an altitude of 2,200 m (7,200 ft) in the Vale of Kashmir. Pahalgam is the headquarters of the Pahalgam tehsil, one of the eleven tehsils in Anantnag district.

Located about 45 km (28 mi) from Anantnag, the town is a popular tourist destination and hill station. The town is the starting point of the annual pilgrimage to the Amarnath Temple, which takes place in July–August.

=== Sonmarg ===
Sonamarg provides glaciers like Kolahoi Peak & trekking routes leading to Vishansar Lake, Krishansar Lake, Gangabal Lake, and Gadsar Lake in the Himalayas, which are stocked with snowtrout and brown trout. The Sind River meanders here and abounds with trout and mahseer. Ponies can be hired for a trip up to Thajiwas glacier, in the summer. The Yatra to the nearby Amarnath Temple begins in Sonamarg.

Baltal, 15 km east of Sonamarg, is a valley that lies at the foot of the Zoji La pass. Trekkers can also reach the city of Leh—known as "the rooftop of the world"—by crossing over the Zoji La.

The Jammu and Kashmir tourism department organizes river rafting tournaments at Sonamarg throughout the year, which have recently seen the participation of teams from abroad.

=== Srinagar ===
Srinagar is one of several places that have been called the "Venice of the East". Lakes around the city include Dal Lake – noted for its houseboats – and Nigeen Lake. Apart from Dal Lake and Nigeen Lake, Wular Lake and Manasbal Lake both lie to the north of Srinagar. Wular Lake is one of the largest fresh water lakes in Asia.

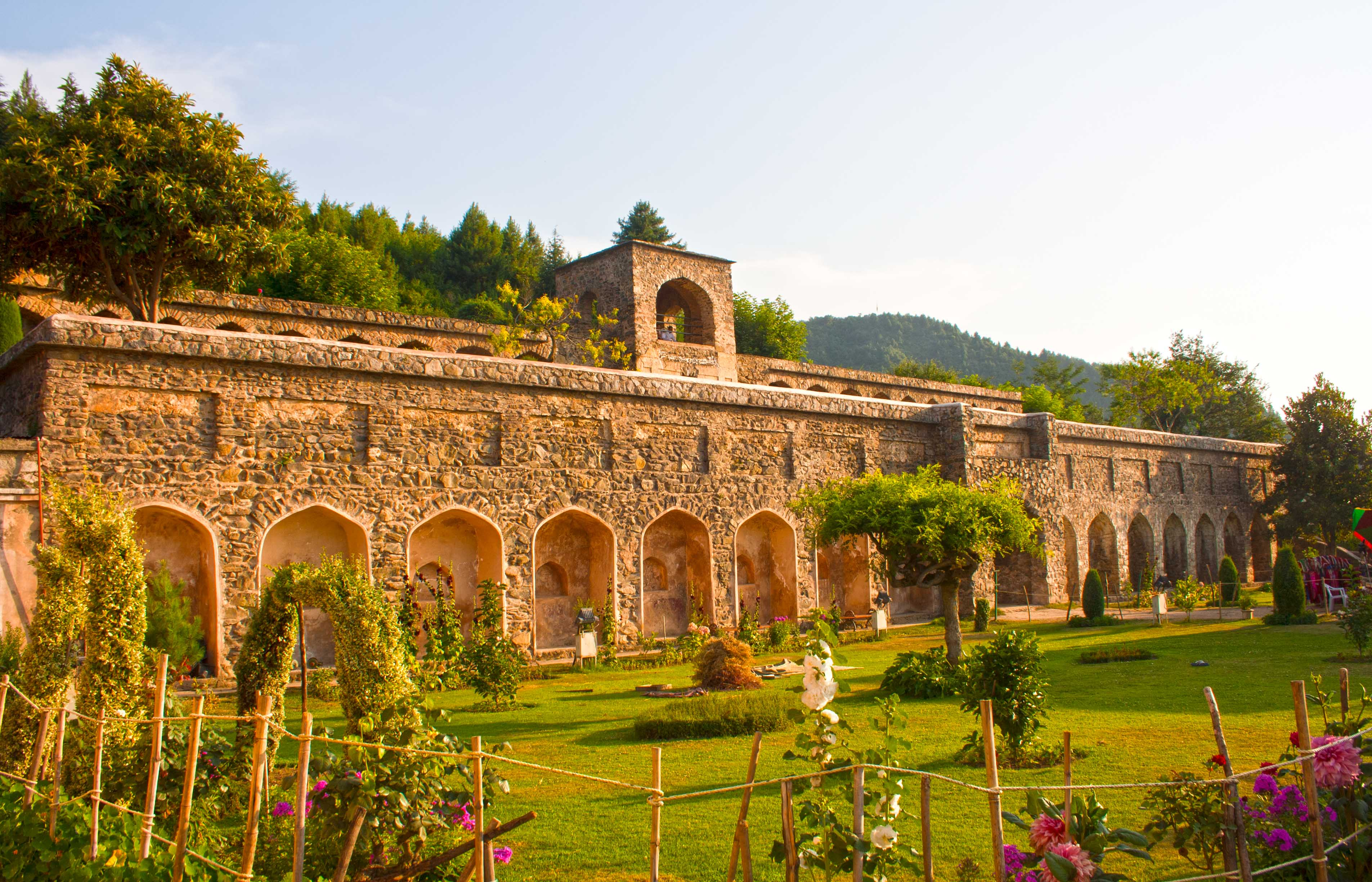
Pari Mahal

Srinagar has some Mughal gardens, forming a part of those laid by the Mughal emperors across the Indian subcontinent. Those of Srinagar and its close vicinity include Chashma Shahi (the royal fountains); Pari Mahal (the palace of the fairies); Nishat Bagh (the garden of spring); Shalimar Bagh; the Naseem Bagh. Jawaharlal Nehru Memorial Botanical Garden is a botanical garden in the city, set up in 1969. The Indian government has included these gardens under "Mughal Gardens of Jammu and Kashmir" in the tentative list for sites to be included in world Heritage sites.

The Sher Garhi Palace houses administrative buildings from the state government. Another palace of the Maharajas, the Gulab Bhavan, has now become the Lalit Grand Palace hotel.

The Shankaracharya Temple lies on a hill top in the middle of the city.

Indira Gandhi Memorial Tulip garden, previously Model Floriculture Center, is a tulip garden in Srinagar. It is the largest tulip garden in Asia spread over an area of about 30 hectares (74 acres). It is situated at the base of the Zabarwan range, built on a sloping ground in a terraced fashion consisting of seven terraces with an overview of the Dal Lake. The garden was opened in 2007 with the aim to boost floriculture and tourism in the Kashmir Valley. It was formerly known as Siraj Bagh. About 1.5 million tulip bulbs, all in multiple colours, were brought from Keukenhof tulip gardens of Amsterdam. Besides tulips, there are 46 varieties of flowers, including hyacinths, daffodils and ranunculus which were also brought from Holland. The tulip garden is home to around 68 varieties of tulips. The Tulip festival is an annual Spring festival to increase tourism by the Government of Jammu and Kashmir. The festival showcases a variety of flowers in the garden.

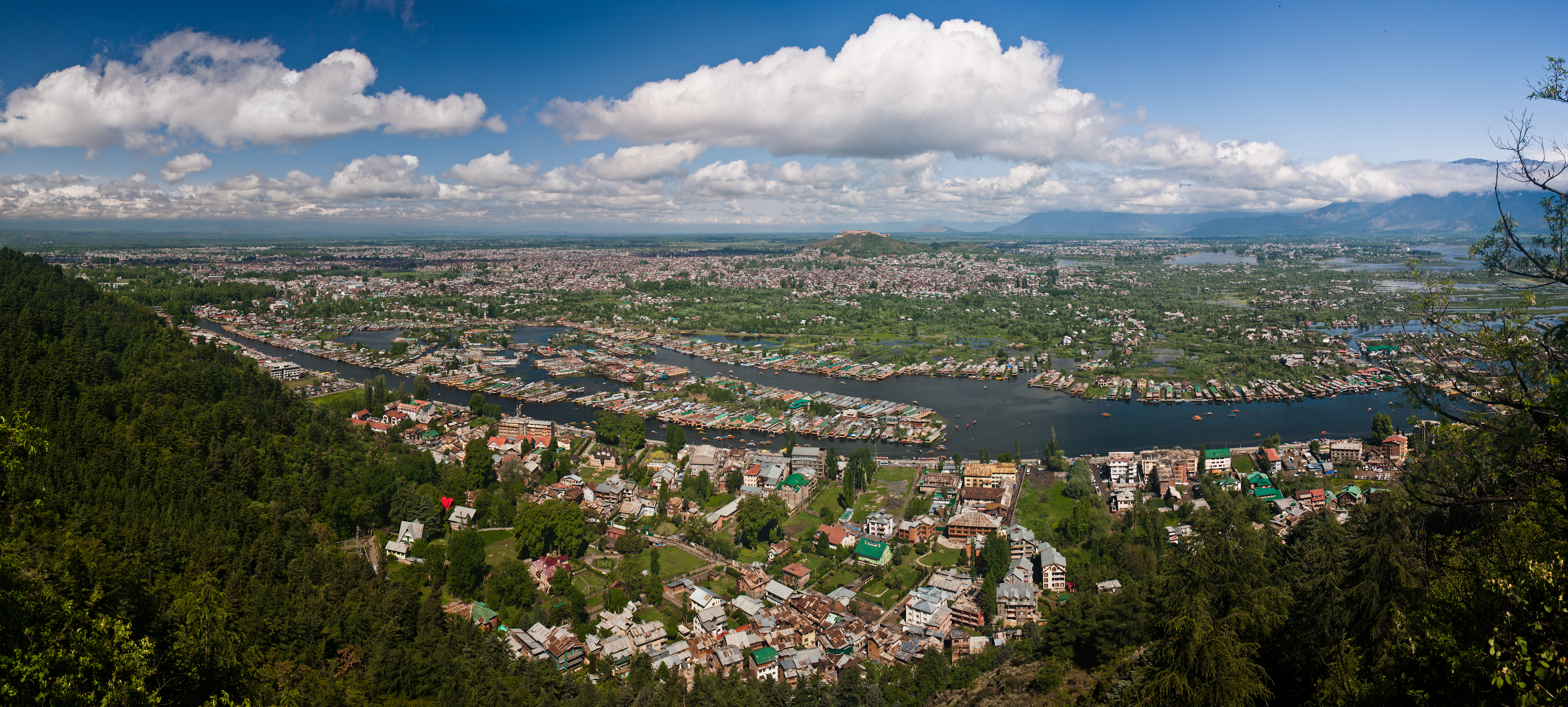
Panorama of Srinagar

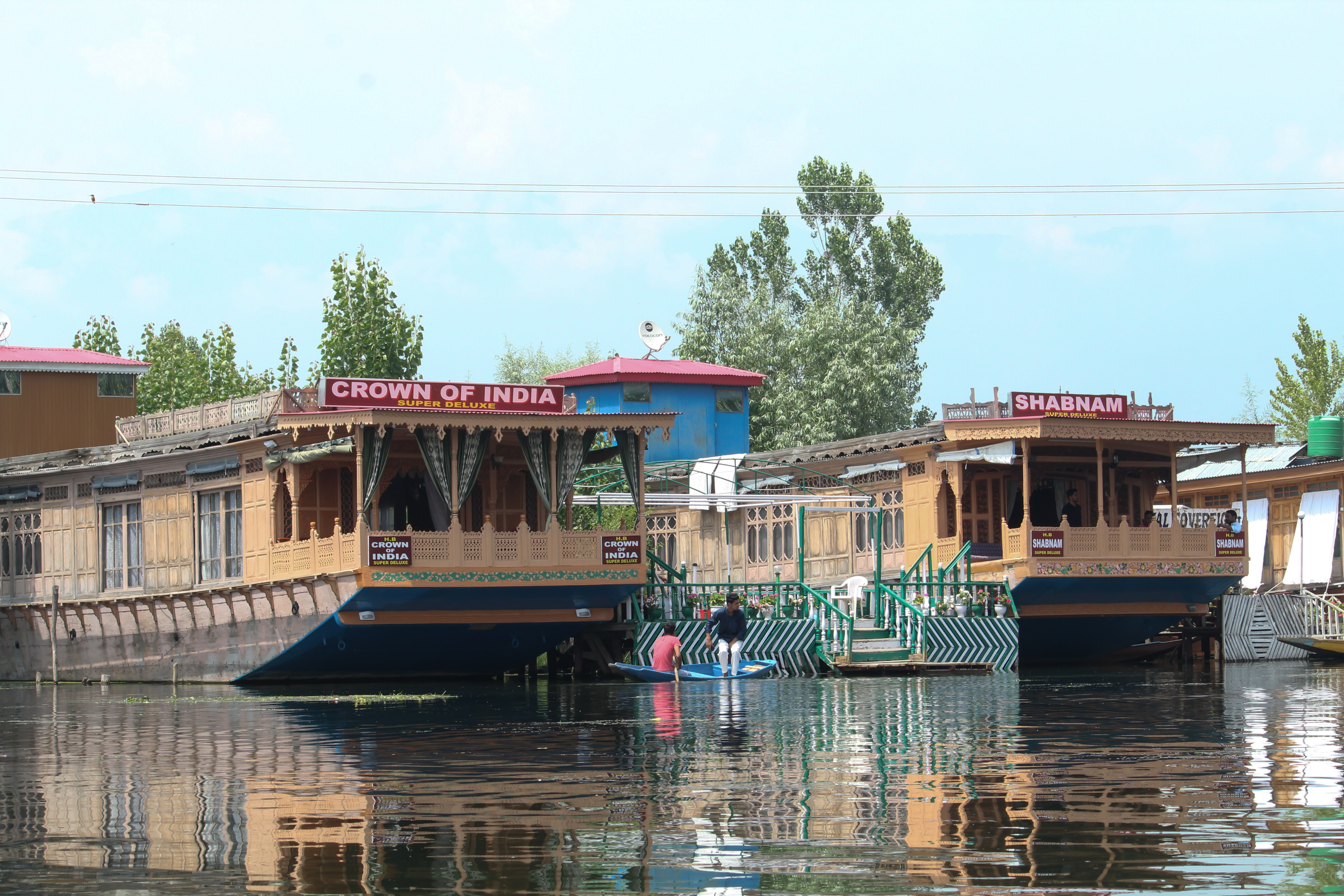
Houseboats on Dal Lake

=== Verinag ===
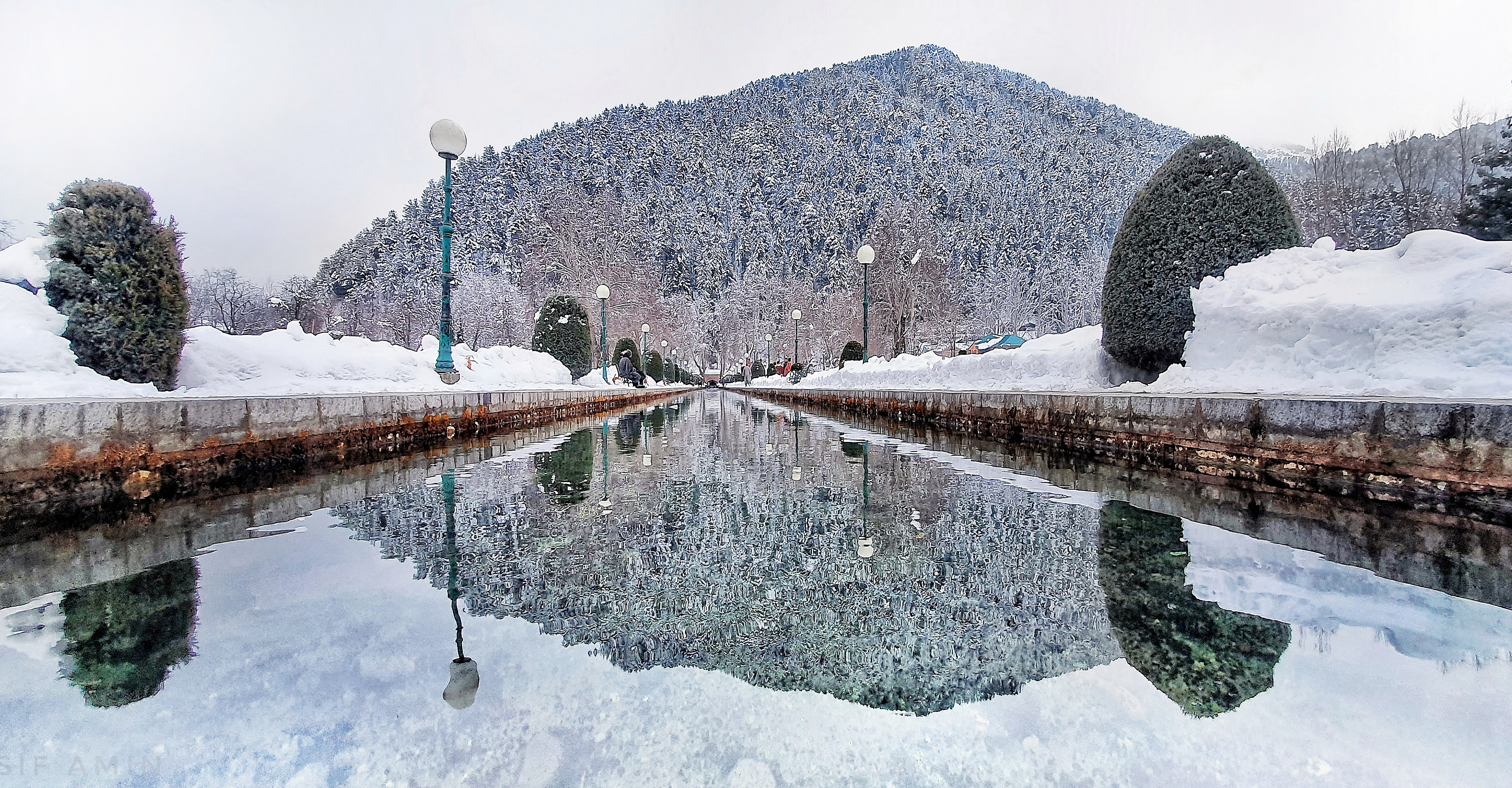
Snow-clad view of Verinag Garden

Verinag (Urdu pronunciation: [ʋeːɾiːnɑːɡ] ; Kashmiri pronunciation: [ʋeːrnaːɡ]) is a town named after and famous for the Verinag spring and Mughal Garden, near Anantnag city in the Anantnag district of the union territory of Jammu and Kashmir, India. It is also called "gateway of Kashmir" and is a notified area committee with tehsil status (Shahabad Bala Verinag) and is about 26 kilometers away from Anantnag and approximately 78 kilometres south-east from Srinagar which is the summer capital of the union territory of Jammu and Kashmir. Verinag is also the first tourist spot of Kashmir Valley when travelling by road from Jammu, the winter capital of the union territory of Jammu and Kashmir towards Srinagar. There is an octagonal stone basin at Verinag Spring and an arcade surrounding it which were built by Mughal emperor Jahangir in 1620 A.D. Later, a beautiful garden next to this spring, was laid out by his son Shah Jahan. This spring is known to never dry up or overflow. Verinag Spring is also the major source of river Jhelum. Verinag Spring and Mughal Arcade surrounding it is officially recognized by Archaeological Survey of India as a Monument of National Importance.

Verinag spring is the main source of River Jehlum, (vyeth in local Kashmiri language) which flows throughout the valley of Kashmir and finally enters into Pakistan-administered Kashmir.

=== Gurez ===
Gurez, or Gurais (Guráai in Shina language), is a tehsil in Bandipore District of Indian-administered Jammu and Kashmir. It contains most of the Gurez Valley, located in the high Himalayas to the north of the Kashmir Valley, separated from it by the great Himalayan range, and is situated about 86 kilometres (53 mi) from district headquarters Bandipore and 123 kilometres (76 mi) from Srinagar. A sub-valley of Gurez beyond Kamri came under Pakistani control after 1947, including Minimarg, and is today part of Astore District in Gilgit-Baltistan.

Gurez lies near the Line of Control, which separates it from the Astore and Neelum Districts of Pakistan-administered Kashmir. The Burzil Pass in Astore leads from it into Astore Valley. At about 2,400 metres (8,000 ft) above sea level, the valley is surrounded by snow-capped mountains. The fauna include the Himalayan brown bear and the snow leopard. The Neelum River flows through the valley. Due to heavy snowfall and closure of Razdan Pass in winter, Gurez remains cut off for six months of the year from rest of Indian-administered Jammu and Kashmir.

Dawar is the central township in the area. The population of the area is estimated to be about 40,000, and is scattered among fifteen villages. Majority of the inhabitants are ethnic Shins. They speak the Shina language and have the same dress styles and culture as their kinsmen in Pakistan-administered Gilgit-Baltistan.

=== Doodhpathri ===
Doodhpathri (transl. Valley of Milk; Urdu pronunciation: [d̪uːd̪ʱ pət̪ʰɾiː]; Kashmiri pronunciation: [dɔdɨ patʰɨr]) is a tourist destination and a hill station located in the Khansahib tehsil of the Budgam district of Jammu and Kashmir, India. Situated at an altitude of 2,730 metres (8,960 ft) from sea level, it is located at a distance of 42 km (26 mi) from Jammu and Kashmir's summer capital, Srinagar, and 30 km (19 mi) from its district headquarters, Budgam.

=== Kheer Bhawani ===
Kheer Bhawani, Ksheer Bhawani or the Ragnya Devi temple (Note: Also spelt as Khir Bhawani, Kshir Bhawani. Also referred to as the Tula Mula shrine or mandir, the Ragnya Devi temple. and Mata Kheer Bhawani Temple (where mata is an honorific). The spring has been referred to as a Kund which translates to pond or temple tank.) is a Hindu temple situated at a distance of 25 kilometres (16 mi) north-east of Srinagar, Jammu and Kashmir, India, in the village of Tulmulla (Note: Also spelt Tul Mul, Tulmula, Tulamulla, Tulmulla, Tulla Mulla, Tullamula, and Tullamulla. Some people are of the opinion that there was a mulberry tree near holy spot of Kheer Bhawani which, in local language, is called tul mul. But tul mul is also derived from the Sanskrit word atulya mulya meaning great value.) in Ganderbal. It is dedicated to the Hindu goddess Kheer Bhavani constructed over a sacred spring. As is the custom with Hindu deities, the goddess has many names including Ragnya or Rajna, (Note: Maharagya Devi, Ragnya Devi, Rajni, Ragini, Ragniya, Ragnya Bhagwati, Maharagya, Maharagnya Bhagwati where 'devi', 'mata', maha, and 'bhagwati' are honorifics) along with variations in honorifics such as Devi, Mata or Bhagavati. The term kheer refers to a milk and rice pudding that is offered to propitiate the goddess. Kheer Bhawani is sometimes translated as 'Milk Goddess'. The worship of Kheer Bhawani is universal among the Hindu Kashmiris, most of them who worship her as their protective patron deity Kuladevi.it is Also consider kuldevi of CKP (Chandraseniya Kayastha Prabhu)

The sacred spring here has its own attached belief. An eponymously named mela is held annually here. It is one of the largest gatherings of Hindus in the region following the Amarnath pilgrimage. Maharaja Pratap Singh of Jammu and Kashmir and Maharaja Hari Singh contributed to building and renovating the temple.

There are other temples to Kheer Bhawani in the region, such as Mata Kheer Bhawani Temple at Tikker, Kupwara.

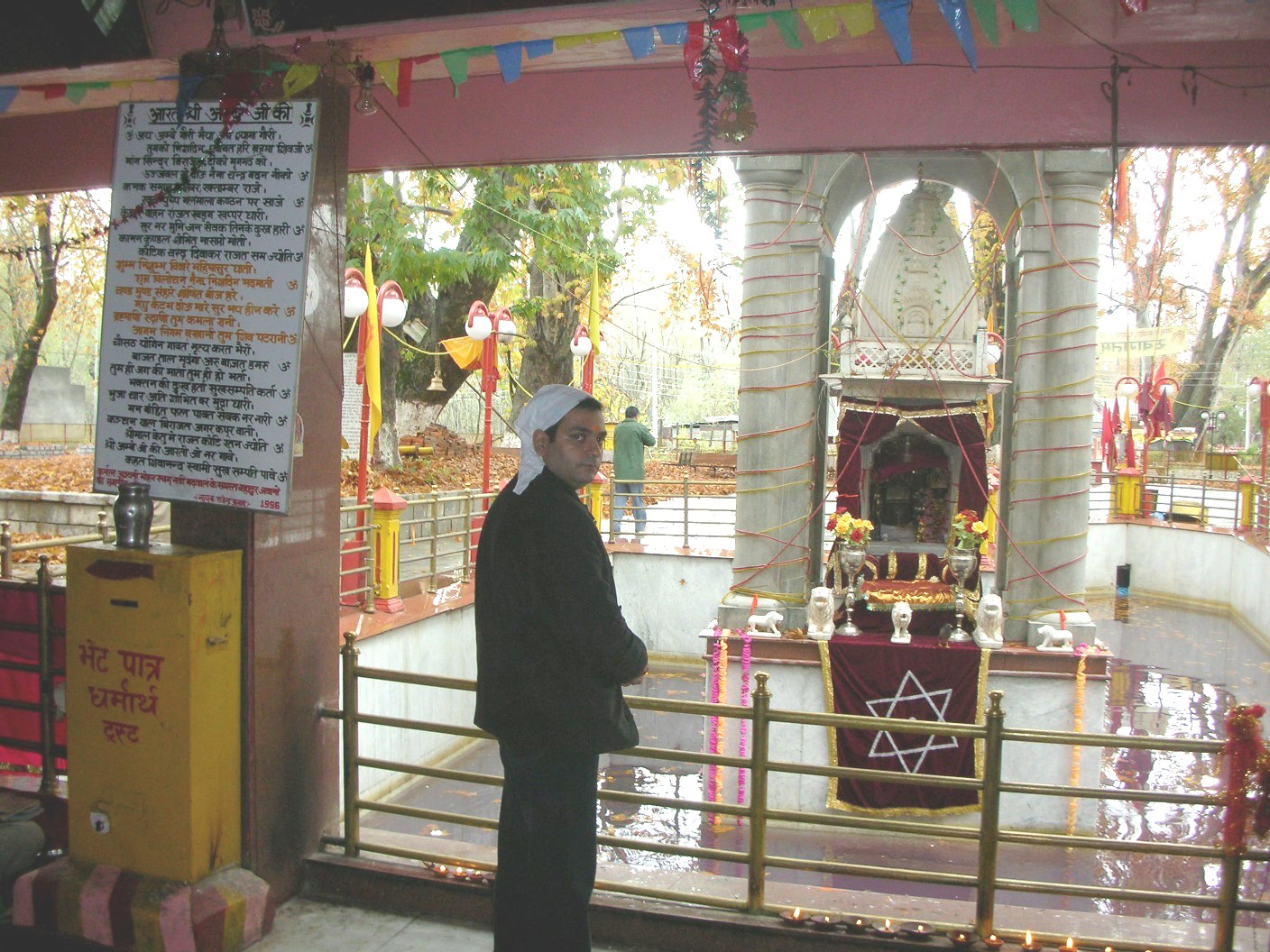
Devotee at the Temple

== Major tourist attractions in Jammu Division ==
The major tourist attractions in this region are;

- Katra
- Bawe
- Patnitop
- Nathatop
- Akhnoor
- Sanasar
- Basohli
- Ramnagar Fort
- Batote
- Mansar Lake
- Surinsar Lake
- Mubarak Mandi
- Bhaderwah
- Devigol
- Bunjwah
- Jai Valley
- Padri Pass
- Lal Draman
- Bhal Padri
- Sinthan Top
- Chenab Rail Bridge

== Adventure tourism ==
=== Skiing ===
- Sanasar
- Patnitop
- Gulmarg
- Jai Valley: The Jai Valley at a height of 7000 ft. located 32 km from Bhaderwah, and 232 km (approx.) from Jammu is a region spread over 6 km receives ample snow to attract ski-lovers and snow-boarders.

=== Rafting ===
- Sonamarg- river rafting tournaments are held by tourism department.
- The Reasi- Dera Baba Banda Bahadur stretch of 12 km (approx.) houses rapids up to 3rd grade and is ideal for amateurs and joy rides.

=== Para-gliding ===
- Sanasar, 19 km west of Patnitop and 130 km from Jammu.

=== Camping ===
- Sanasar
- Bani-Sarthal
- Jai Valley
- Patnitop
- Devigol

=== Rock climbing ===
- Patnitop
- Sanasar
- Bhaderwah

=== Trekking ===
- Udhampur
- Patnitop
- Kishtwar
- Bhaderwah
- Bunjwah
- Devigol
- Bani-Basholi
- Sarthal valley
- Sonamarg

=== Post-Attack Confidence-Building Measures ===
In June 2025, Union Tourism Minister Gajendra Singh Shekhawat undertook a two-day official visit to Jammu and Kashmir aimed at restoring tourist confidence in the region following the Pahalgam terror attack on April 22. During his visit, Shekhawat was scheduled to meet Chief Minister Omar Abdullah and assess key tourism sites.

The minister's itinerary included visits to prominent religious and tourist locations such as the Kheer Bhawani Temple, Martand Surya Temple, and the scenic areas of Pahalgam and Betaab Valley in Anantnag district—places that had seen heightened security concerns in the wake of the attack.

A day after the incident, Shekhawat had stated that his office was in “continuous touch” with Jammu and Kashmir’s chief secretary and tourism secretary, closely monitoring the situation. He had assured that the ministry would work actively to “minimise the dent” on tourism and reinforce Jammu and Kashmir’s image as a safe and welcoming destination for visitors.

== Transport ==
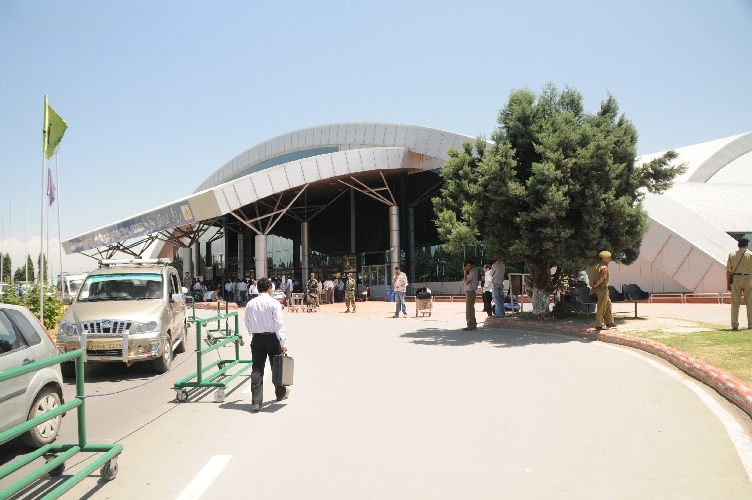
View of Srinagar Airport

The primary methods of transport in Jammu and Kashmir are by road and air. It has access to the rest of India through the Banihal road tunnel near Qazigund through NH 1A (now known as NH 44) and through NH 1B that passes through Sinthan pass and Kishtwar.

Jammu and Kashmir has 2 civil airports. The Jammu Airport and the Srinagar Airport. They receive direct flights from New Delhi, Mumbai and Bengaluru.

Jammu and Kashmir has a 119 km (74 mi) long modern railway line that started in October 2009 and connects Baramulla in the western part of the valley to Srinagar and Qazigund. It further links the Kashmir Valley to Banihal across the Pir Panjal mountains through the new 11.215 km (6.969 mi) long Pir Panjal Railway Tunnel or through the Banihal rail tunnel. Banihal railway station will be linked to the rest of India in another few years as the construction of the railway line from Jammu to Banihal progresses steadily.

== See also ==
- List of tourist attractions in Chenab Valley.
- Kashmir conflict
