= Tipri =

Village in Jammu and Kashmir

- Village
- Location in Jammu and Kashmir, India
- Coordinates: 33.1427491°N 75.8951650°E
- Country: India
- Union Territory: Jammu and Kashmir
- District: Kishtwar

Population (2011)
  - Total: 1,924

Languages
  - Official: Urdu, English
  - Spoken: Kashmiri, Gojri,
- Time zone: UTC+5:30 (IST)
- PIN: 182204
- Distance from Kishtwar town: 50 kilometres (31 mi)
- Distance from Jammu: 210 kilometres (130 mi)

Tipri is a village in the tehsil of Bunjwah, district Kishtwar, Union Territory of Jammu and Kashmir.

== See also ==
- Patnazi
- Devigol
- Kalnai River
- Bunjwah
- Kither
