= Sledding in India =

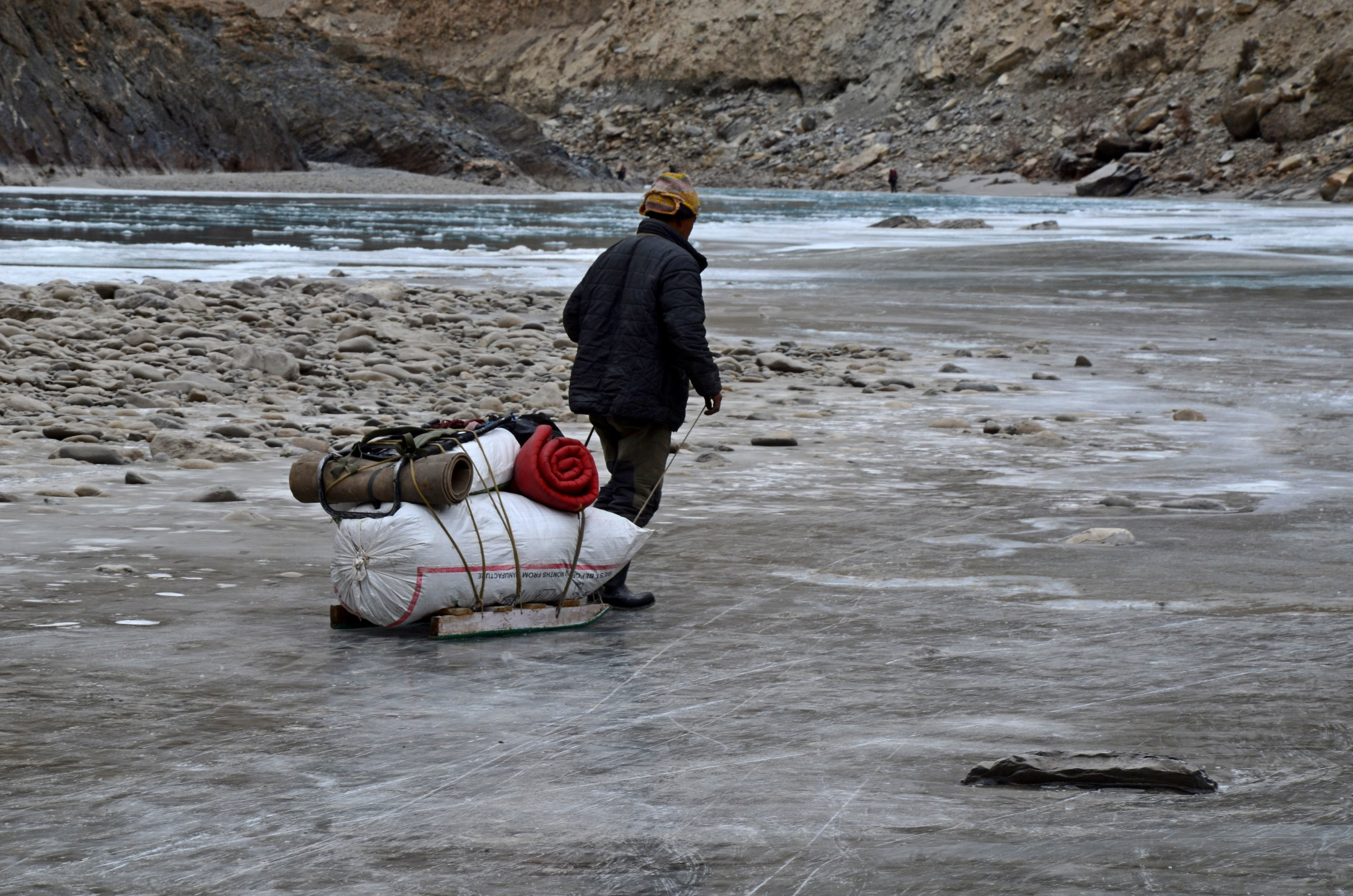
- A sled being used to carry equipment and supplies during a trek in Ladakh, India
- Country: India
- Governing body: Bobsleigh and Skeleton Association of India, Luge Federation of India
- National team: India

Sledding, encompassing sports such as luge, skeleton, and bobsledding, is popular as a recreational activity in India, but with little participation as a serious sport. However, India has produced a handful of sledding athletes who have been successful at the top level, the most prominent being medal-winning luger Shiva Keshavan. Despite the country's predominantly tropical climate, these winter sports have gained some prominence in recent years due to Indian athletes competing internationally and the growth of winter tourism in the Himalayan regions which have suitable winter conditions. India is considered to have a huge untapped potential for winter sports, including sledding.

Tobogganing is practiced in Kufri, Himachal Pradesh. Balram Menon is an Indian who has done cross-country dog sledding in Mongolia.

== Governing bodies ==
Luge in India is administered by the Luge Federation of India which is affiliated to the International Luge Federation (FIL), while bobsleighing and skeleton in India are administered by the Bobsleigh and Skeleton Association of India, which in tuen is affiliated with the International Bobsleigh and Skeleton Federation.

== Notable athletes ==
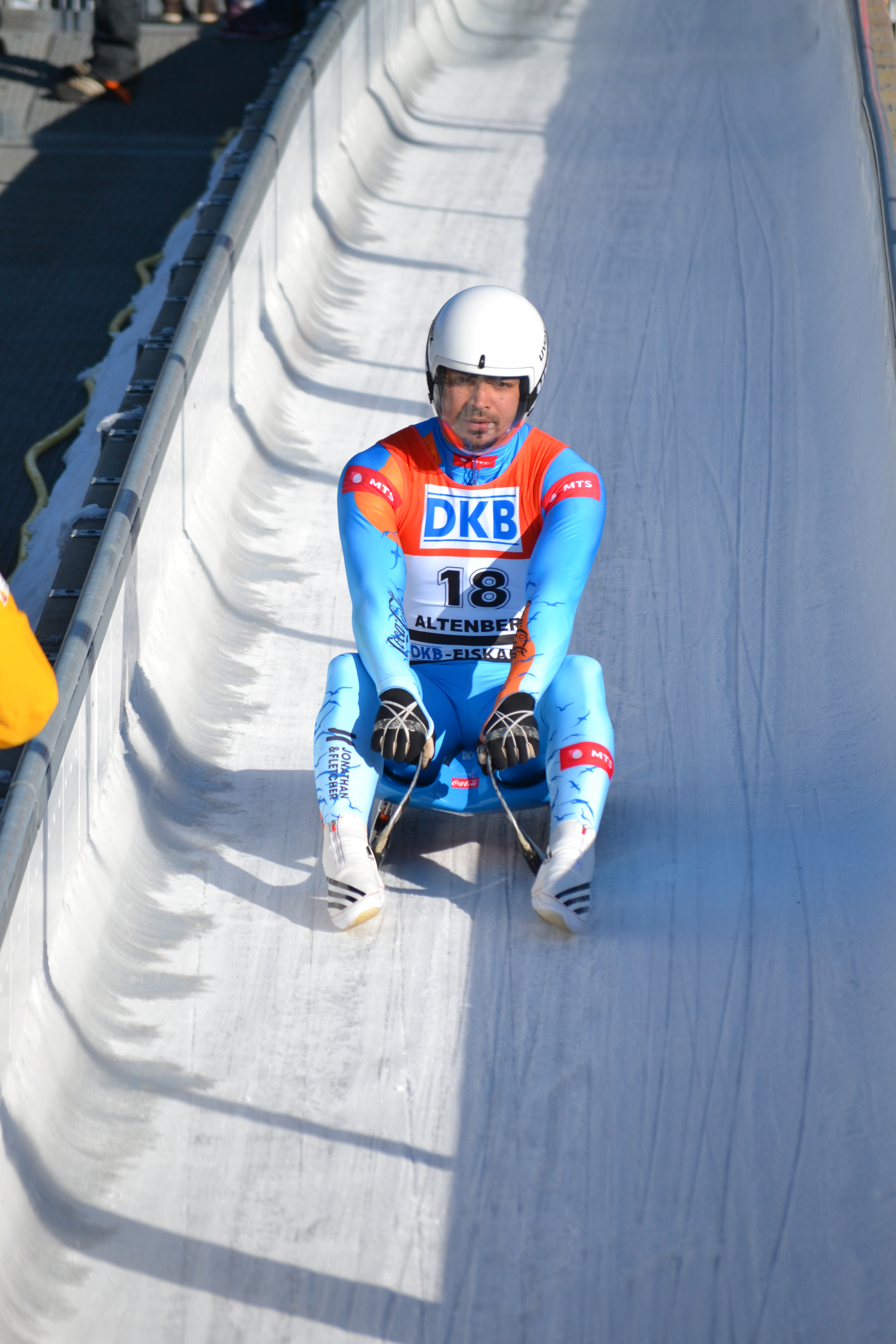
Shiva Keshavan

Shiva Keshavan has been a talismanic member of India's Winter Olympics contingents over the years, having competed in the six consecutive editions of the Games from 1998 to 2018. In 1998 Keshavan became the youngest ever person to compete at luge at the Winter Olympics, at Nagano, Japan at the age of 16 years. He won three gold, four silver and three bronze medals at the Asia Cup and Asian Championships since 2005. He also bagged a gold at the 2017 Asian Luge Championships in Altenberg, Germany. He is also the first Indian to have won an international medal in any winter sport. Keshavan rues the lack of support from Indian sports authorities. Keshavan built his own sleds while competing with athletes whose sleds were design by automotive companies.

== Sledding locations in India ==
- Auli, Uttarakhand
- Gulmarg, Jammu and Kashmir
- Dhanaulti, Uttarakhand
- Katao, Sikkim
- Narkanda, Himachal Pradesh
- Pulwama, Jammu and Kashmir
- Rohtang, Himachal Pradesh
- Shimla, Himachal Pradesh
- Sonamarg, Jammu and Kashmir
- Spiti, Himachal Pradesh
- Tawang, Arunachal Pradesh
- Nathatop, Jammu and Kashmir

== See also ==
- Sledding
