= Sarthal valley =

Tourist destination in Jammu and Kashmir

- Sarthal
- Location within Jammu and Kashmir Location within India
- Floor elevation: 7,000 ft (2,100 m)

Geography
- Country: India
- State: Jammu and Kashmir
- Region: Jammu region
- District: Kathua district
- Coordinates: 32.827229°N 75.726316°E
- Interactive map of Sarthal valley

Sarthal valley is a tourist destination in Kathua district of Jammu and Kashmir (union territory) in India. This valley covers snow for six months and is covered with snow clad mountains. This area is connecting Bhaderwah on North and Himachal Pradesh on East. The area is situated 20 kilometres (12 mi) from Bani.

== Demographics ==
This tourist destination is situated in Kathua district of Jammu and Kashmir (union territory) in India. It is covered by mountains from all sides and for the few months people from Gujjars community live there for some months and migrate to lower lands of Kathua during winters. Because the region gets heavy snowfall which remain almost for 6 months.

This area's common herbaceous flora are Primula denticulata, Bergenia ciliata, Gentiana indica, Sinopodophyllum hexandrum, Barbarea intermedia, Potentilla sterilis, Anaphaslis busua and Logularia amplexocaulis. Various rivers originates from the hills and mountains of Sarthal including Sewa, Ravi River and Ujh River and all these are covered with Riverine forests.

Sarthal is about 24 kilometres (15 mi) from Bani possess meadows and large number of tourists from Chenab valley, Kathua, Pathankot and other areas of Jammu and Kashmir (union territory) and Himachal Pradesh visit here. The valley is surrounded by snow-capped peaks like- Kaplas, Kuloru, etc.
