= Kaplas Peak =

Mountain in Jammu and Kashmir, India

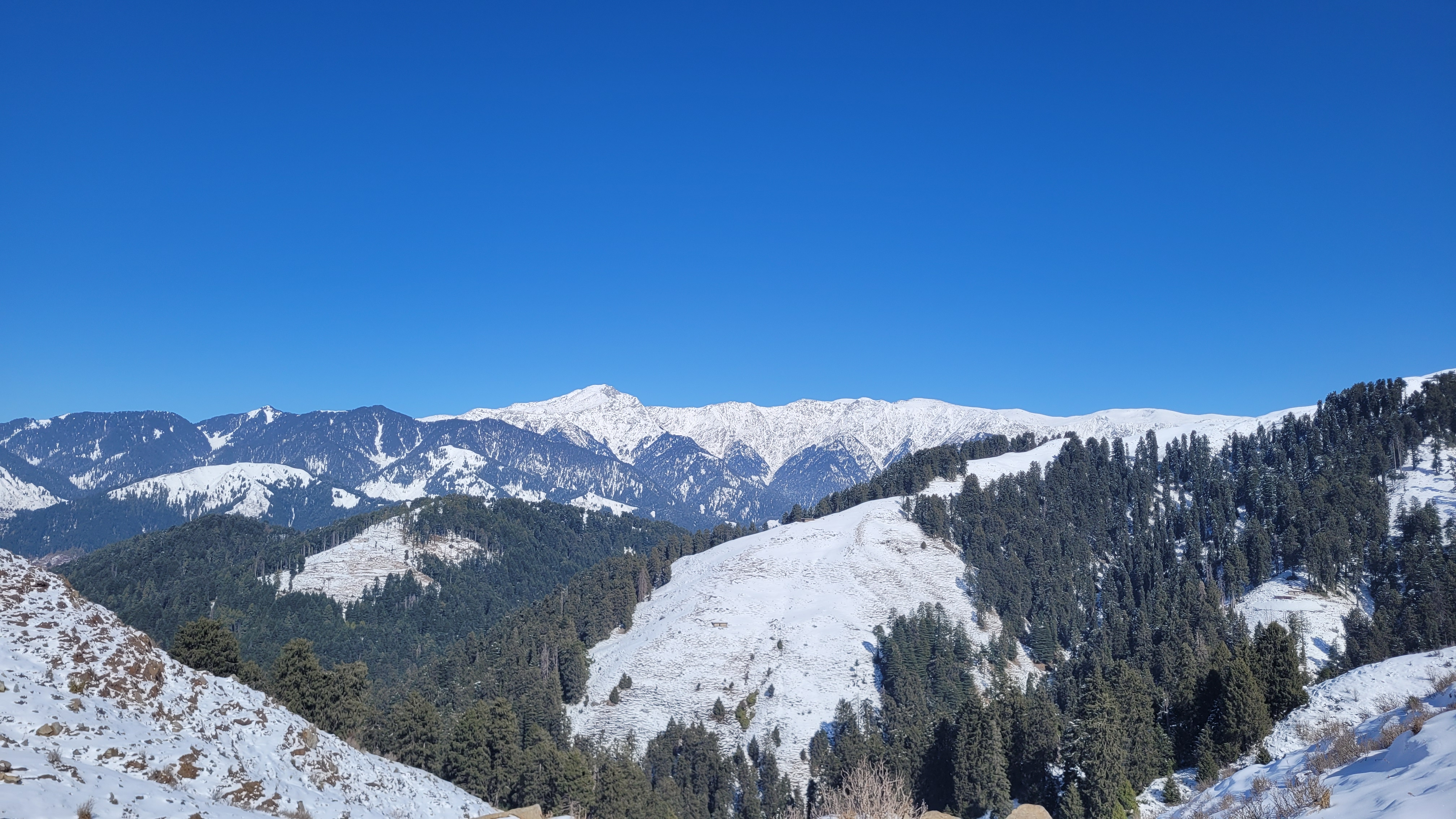
- Kaplas peak (On the right side of the image)

Highest point
- Elevation: 4,335 m (14,222 ft)
- Prominence: 1,305 m (4,281 ft)
- Coordinates: 32°51′51″N 75°40′56″E

Geography
- Location within Jammu and Kashmir
- Location: Jammu division, India
- Parent range: Himalayas

Climbing
- First ascent: Never been climbed

Kaplas Peak is a mountain with a peak elevation of 4,335 metres (14,222 ft), at the border of Kathua district, Udhampur district and Doda district of the Indian union territory of Jammu and Kashmir. Kaplas Peak is part of Pir Panjal range, which is itself a part of Himalayan mountain range, and is located near Sarthal valley of Kathua district. It lies 36 km from Bhaderwah and 52 km north-northeast of Kathua.

== Geology ==
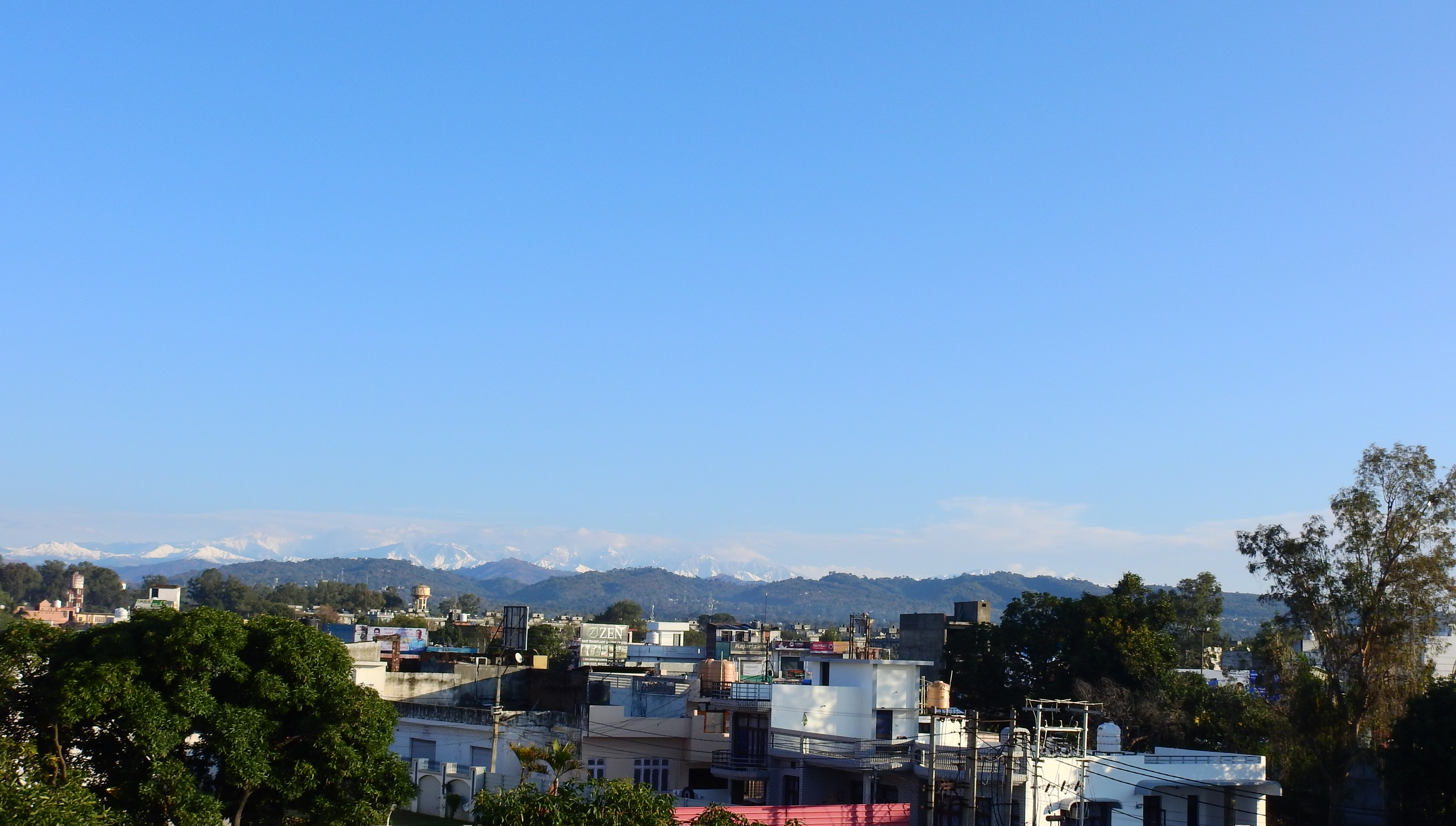
Kaplas massif and nearby mountains, as visible from Kathua town

The mountain forms part of the Kaplas Granite Massif, a prominent intrusive body in the northwestern Himalaya. Geological studies describe the granite as coarse-grained, porphyritic and highly jointed, extending across parts of Bhaderwah and Doda. It is associated with the nearby Bhalla and Doda granitic bodies and has been examined for its petrographic and geochemical characteristics. Researchers classify it within the Himalayan crystalline complex, noting its significance in understanding the tectono-magmatic history of the Jammu region. The massif is easily visible from most parts of the Kathua district.
