= Patnazi =

Village in Jammu and Kashmir

Patnazi Two Panchayats Patnazi (A) And Patnazi (B)
- Village
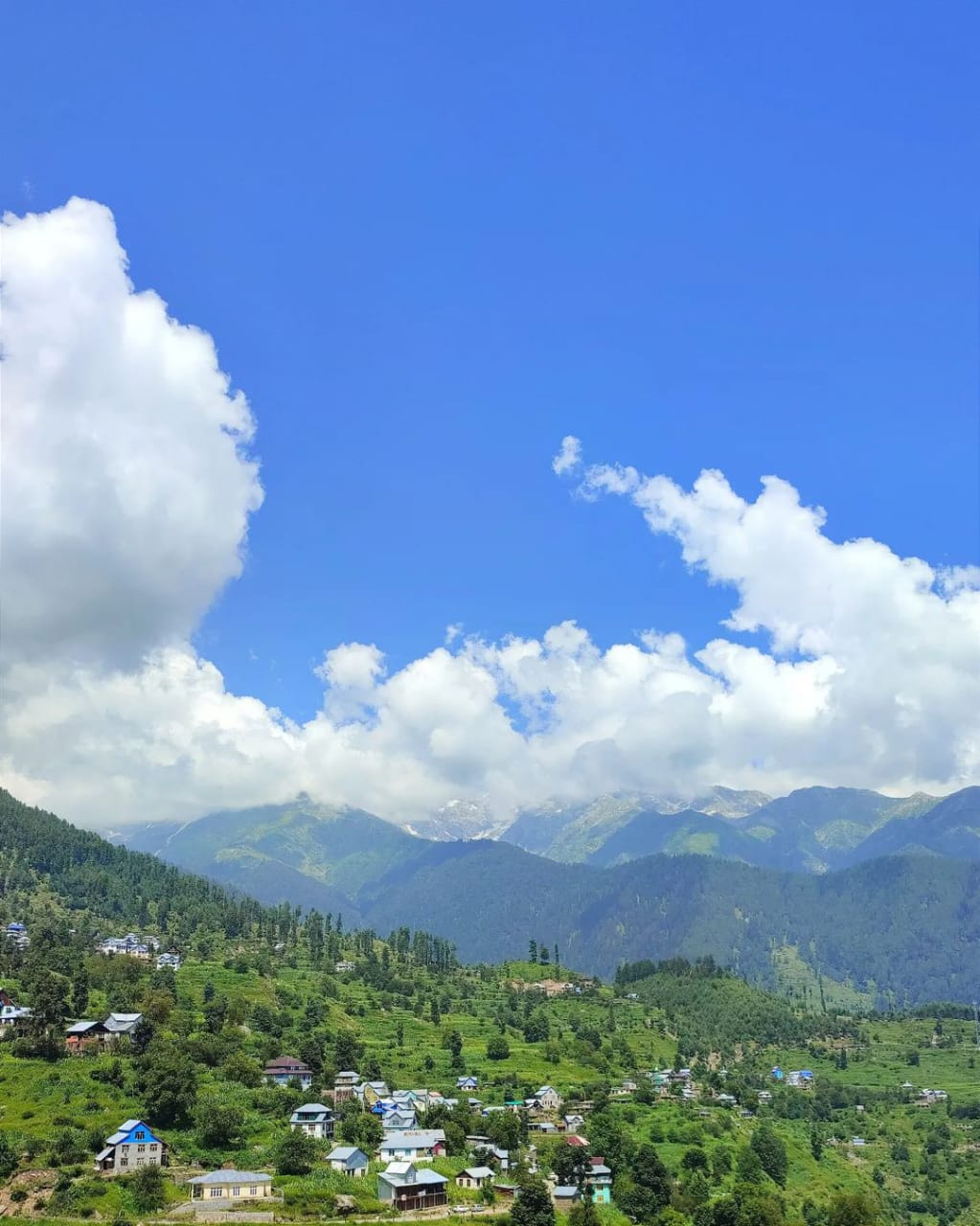
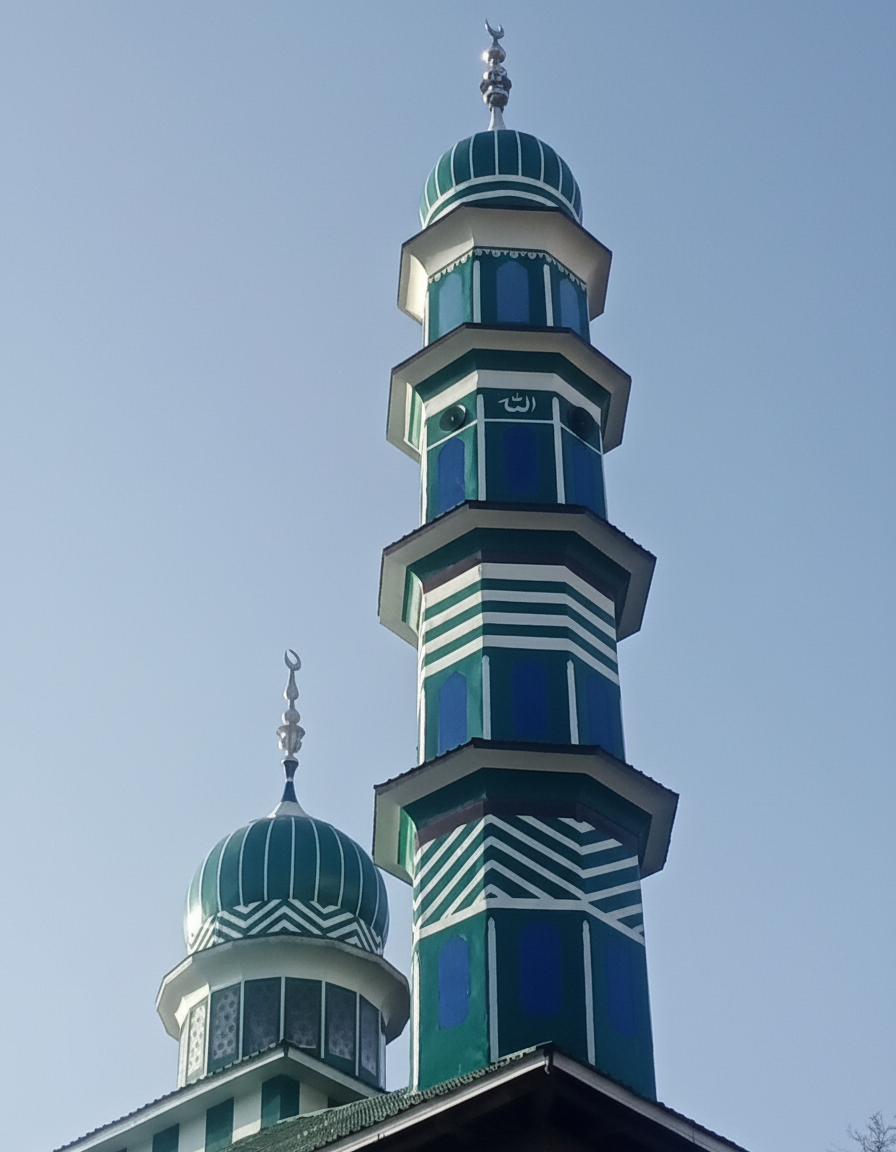
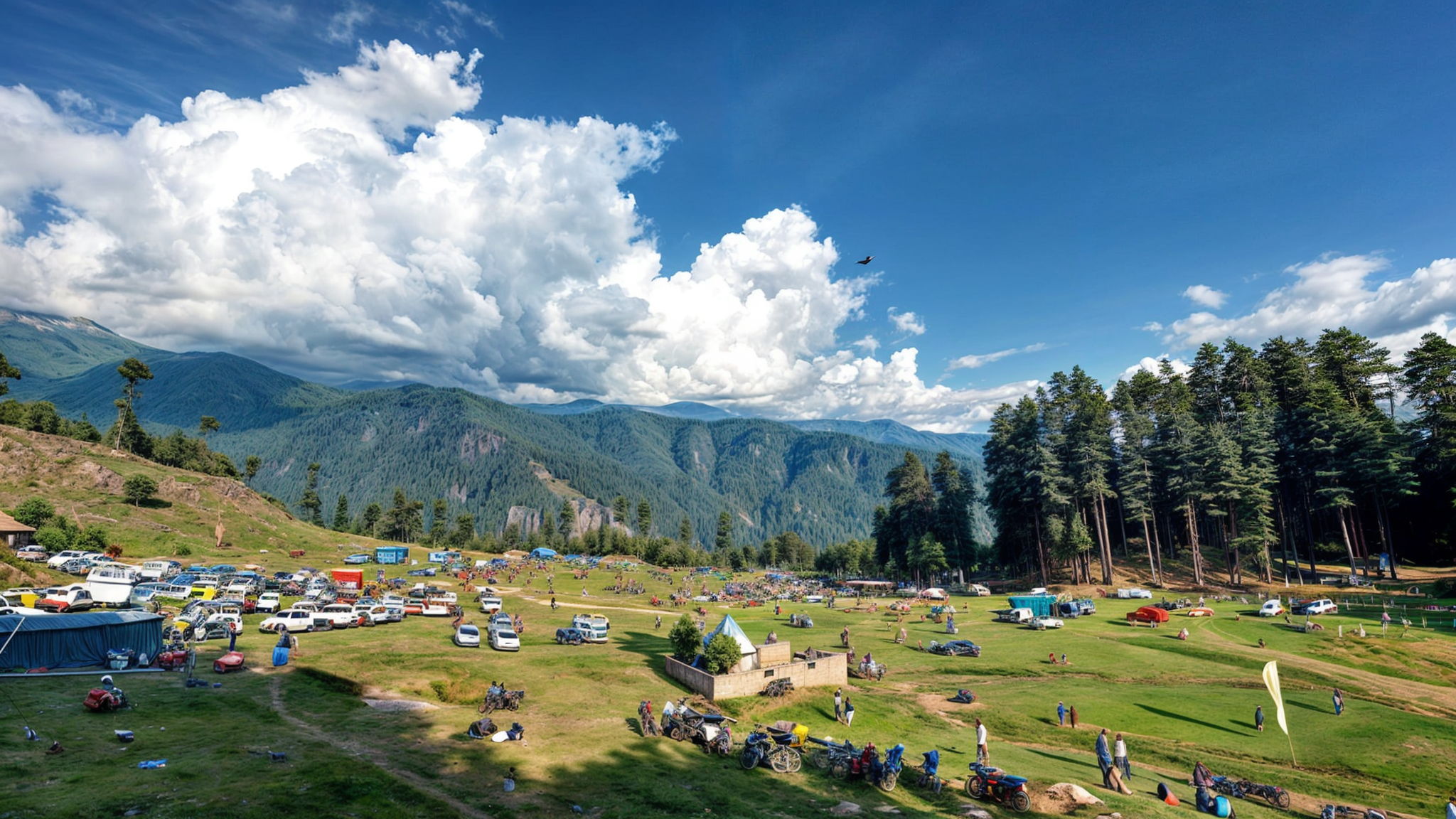
- View Of Patnazi (A) Village Markazi Jamia Masjid Patnazi (A) Popular Tourist Destination Devigol View Of Patnazi village, Markazi Jamia Masjid, and Devigol
- Interactive map of Patnazi
- Location in Jammu and Kashmir, India
- Coordinates: 33.1396186°N 75.9534320°E
- Country: India
- Union Territory: Jammu and Kashmir
- District: Kishtwar

Population (2011)
  - Total: 5,212

Languages
  - Official: Urdu, English
  - Spoken: Kashmiri, Bunjwahi, Bhalessi, Gojri, Kishtwari
- Time zone: UTC+5:30 (IST)
- PIN: 182203
- Distance from Kishtwar town: 60 kilometres (37 mi)
- Distance from Jammu: 220 kilometres (140 mi)

Patnazi is a village in Bunjwah tehsil, Kishtwar district, in the Indian union territory of Jammu and Kashmir. It is 55 km from Kishtwar.

== See also ==
- Devigol
