= Kither =

Village in Jammu and Kashmir

- Village
- Location in Jammu and Kashmir, India
- Coordinates: 33.1073154°N 76.0245135°E
- Country: India
- Union Territory: Jammu and Kashmir
- District: Kishtwar

Population (2011)
  - Total: 861

Languages
  - Official: Urdu, English
  - Spoken: Kashmiri, Gojri,
- Time zone: UTC+5:30 (IST)
- PIN: 182204
- Distance from Kishtwar town: 70 kilometres (43 mi)
- Distance from Jammu: 230 kilometres (140 mi)

Kither is a village in tehsil Bunjwah district Kishtwar in Union Territory of Jammu and Kashmir.

== See also ==
- Kalnai River
