= Bunjwah =

Town in Jammu and Kashmir

Bunjwah Bonzwah
- Tehsil
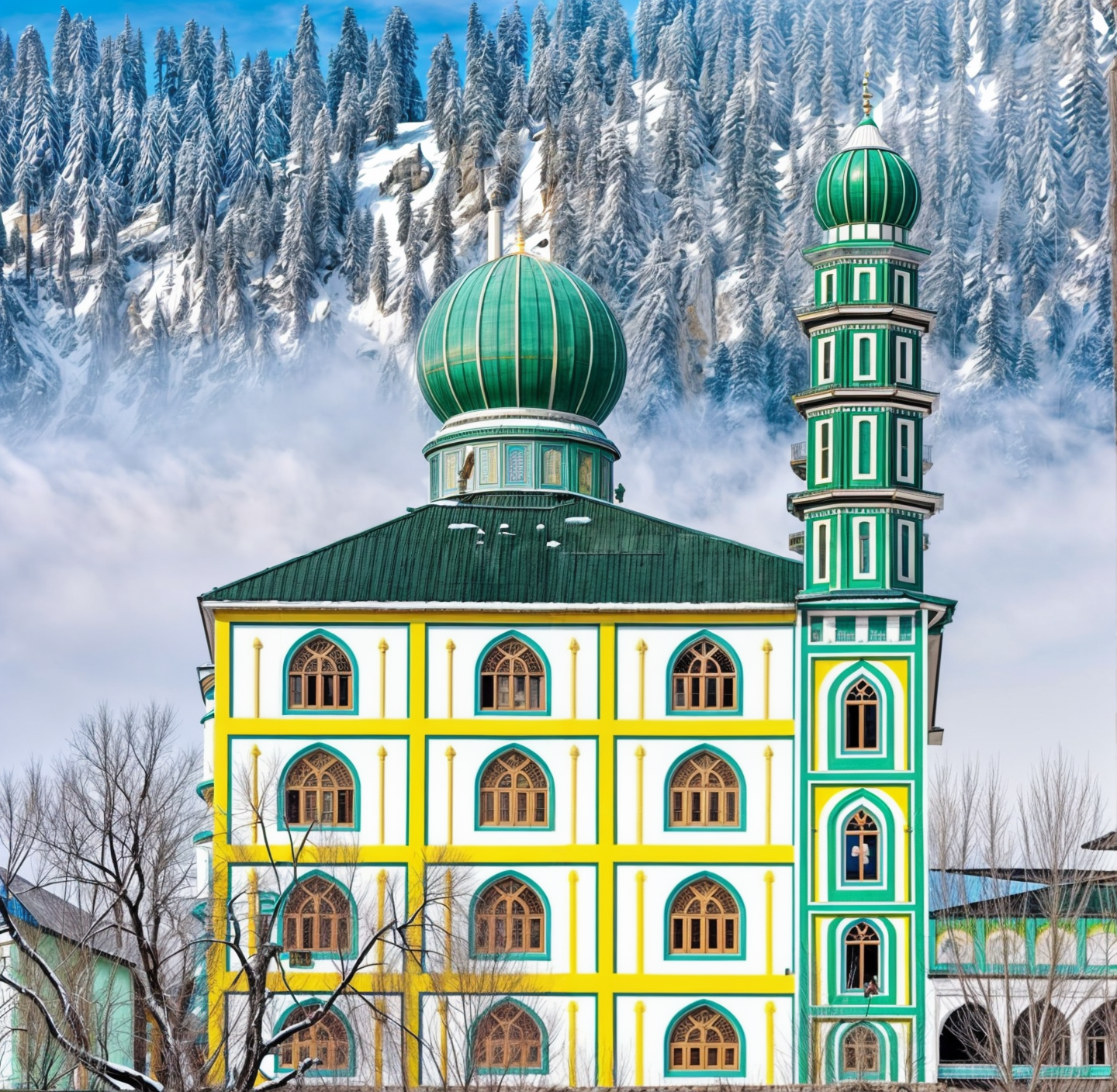
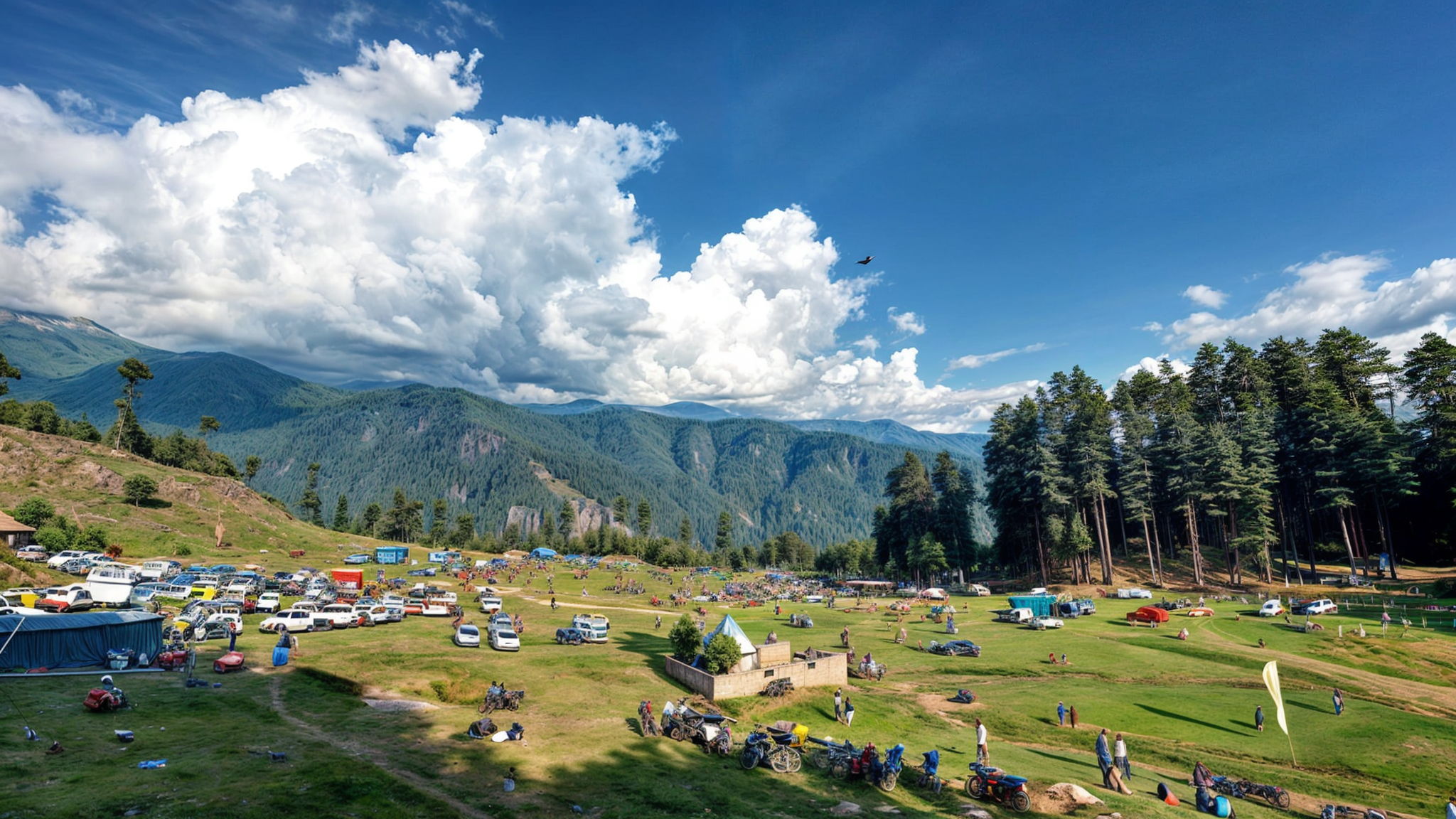
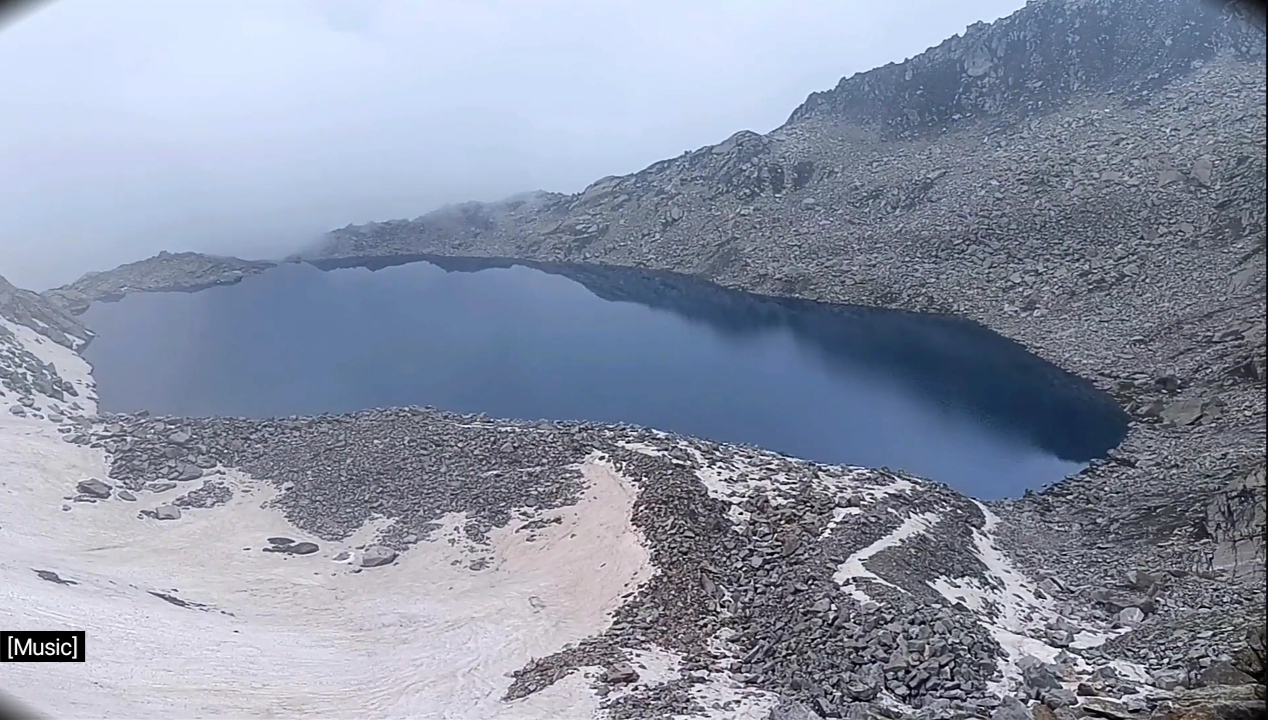
- View Of Jamia Masjid Nali Bunjwah Devigol Hill Station
- Interactive map of Bunjwah
- Coordinates: 33.1372309°N 75.9389554°E
- Country: India
- Union Territory: Jammu and Kashmir
- District: Kishtwar

Population (2011)
  - Total: 15,899

Languages
  - Official: Urdu, English
  - Spoken: Kashmiri, Gojri,
- Time zone: UTC+5:30 (IST)
- PIN: 182203
- Distance from Kishtwar town: 60 kilometres (37 mi)
- Distance from Jammu: 220 kilometres (140 mi)
- Website: kishtwar.nic.in

Bunjwah (also known as Bonjwah or Bonzwah) is a tehsil located in the Kishtwar district of Jammu and Kashmir, India.

== Water Springs ==
Elders say that there used to be 52 water springs in this area, which is why it was named 'Bunjwah'; locally, the number 52 is referred to as 'Bunja'.

== Governance ==
As of 2020, groups demanded separate subdivision status Bunjwah increased with arguments of negligence by the district administration.

== Geography ==
Bunjwah is located 60 kilometres (37 mi) from its district headquarters, Kishtwar. It borders Saroor, Nagseni Padhyarna, the Padder of Kishtwar district, Chilly, Bhalessa, Bhatyas, and the Challer of Doda district. Another of its boundaries runs along Himachal Pradesh's road towards Chamba.

== Education ==
The district hosted over 50 primary schools, although only two secondary schools support the region.

== See also ==
- Patnazi
- Devigol
- Kalnai River
- Kither
- Tipri
