= Bawe =

- Village
- Location of the village in Indonesian Papua
- Coordinates: 2°59′37″S 134°45′26″E
- Country: Indonesia
- Province: Central Papua
- Time zone: UTC+9 (WIT)

Bawe is a coastal village in Central Papua, Indonesia. It is located near the border with West Papua province. Nearby villages include Wakobi which is located 1.8 km to the east, and Armini which lies 2 km to the west.
