= Nathatop =

Tourist place in Jammu and Kashmir, India

- Hill Station
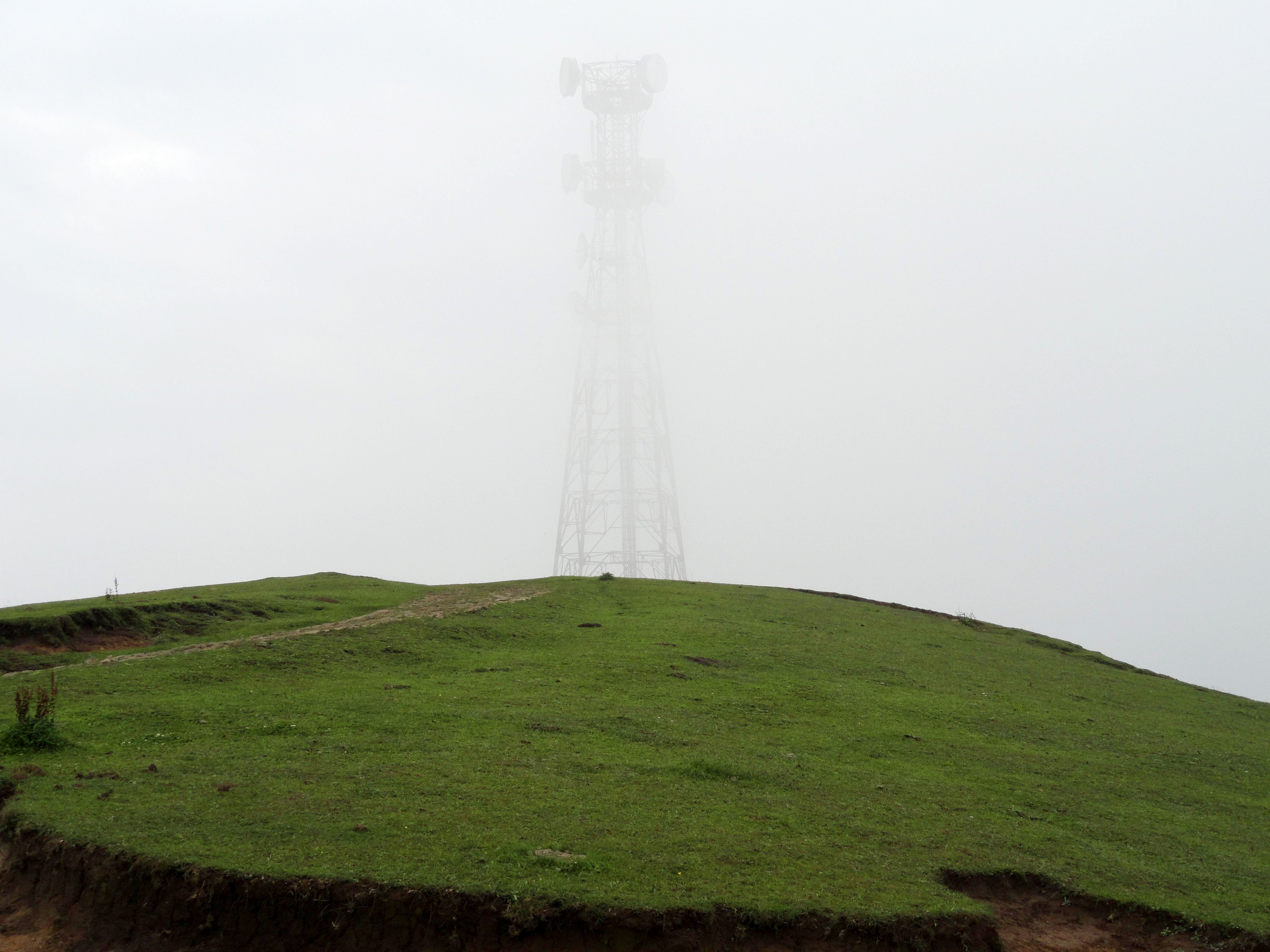
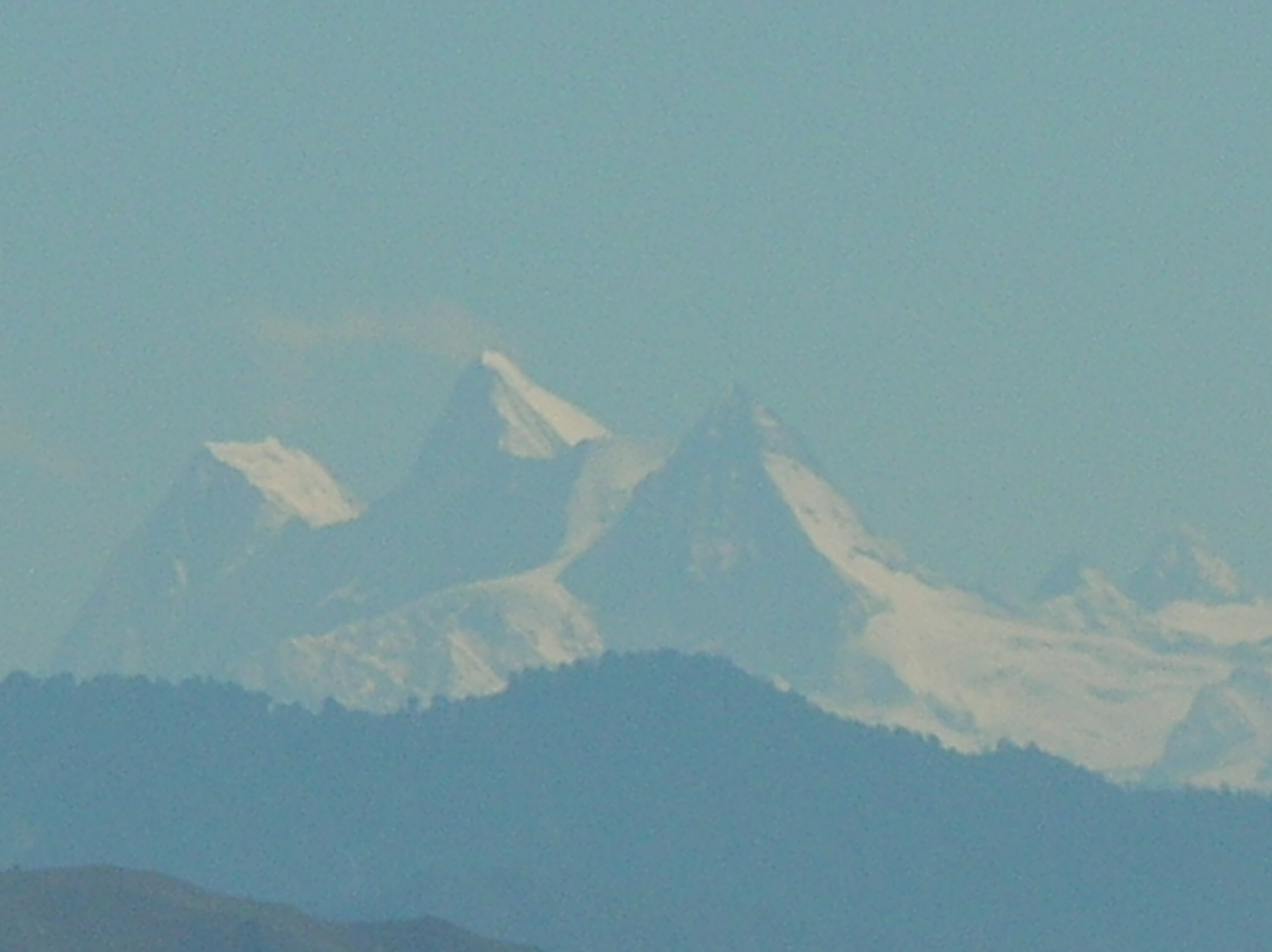
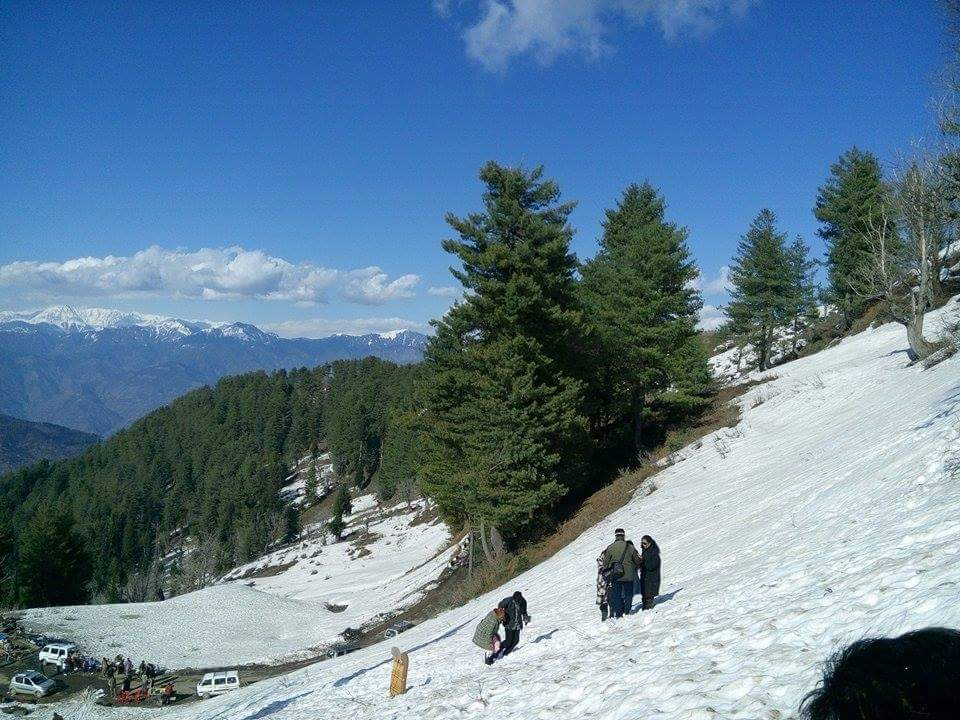
- Nathatop Brahma 1 and 2 peaks, as seen from Nathatop Natha_Top,_Jammu_and_Kashmir

- Location in Jammu and Kashmir Nathatop (India)
- Coordinates: 33°5′25″N 75°19′35″E
- Country: India
- Union Territory: Jammu and Kashmir
- District: Udhampur
- Elevation: 2,133 m (6,998 ft)

Languages
  - Official: Hindi, Dogri
- Time zone: UTC+5:30 (IST)
- PIN: 182142
- Website: patnitop.nic.in

Nathatop is a radar station and tourist spot located, between Sanasar and Patnitop in the Udhampur district of Jammu and Kashmir, India. It is in located on the Jammu-Srinagar National Highway (which is part of National Highway 44, formerly 1A), 121 km (75 mi) from Jammu, on the way from Udhampur to Srinagar. Situated in the lower Himalayan belt of the Himalayas, Nathatop sits at an altitude of 2,133 m (6,998 ft). The river Chenab flows in close proximity to this location. Nathatop lies in District Udhampur of Jammu And Kashmir

== History ==
After Indo-Pakistani War of 1965, Indian Airforce decided to alert its Srinagar Airforce by installing a Radar at an altitude of 2,897 m (9,505 ft) at Shankh Pal Mandir, however considering the sanctity of the site, the leader of location search party Wing Commander Natha Singh decided to change the coordinates and setup the Radar ATCR 2D at its current location in March 1970 named after him in 1995. Route Surveillance Radar was replaced by the ATCR-22 in 1981, followed by a Master T Radar in 2024.

== Legend ==
This site serves as an alternative to the Shankh Pal Temple, which is believed to possess mystical powers. According to local accounts, an Air Force reconnaissance team led by Wing Commander Natha Singh camped near the temple while surveying the area for a potential radar station. However, each morning, they mysteriously found themselves relocated to different spots, far from their original campsite. Consequently, the survey was abandoned, and the radar station was established at this location instead. Locals attribute this to Raja Shankhpal, the temple's deity, who they believe did not want the station near his sacred abode.

== Gallery ==
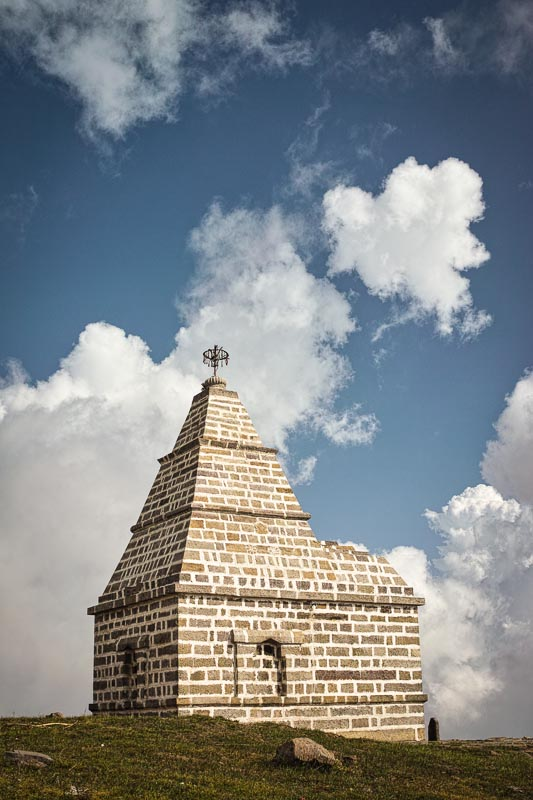
Shankh Pal temple

Dawariyai take off area at Patnitop

Sanasar Lake

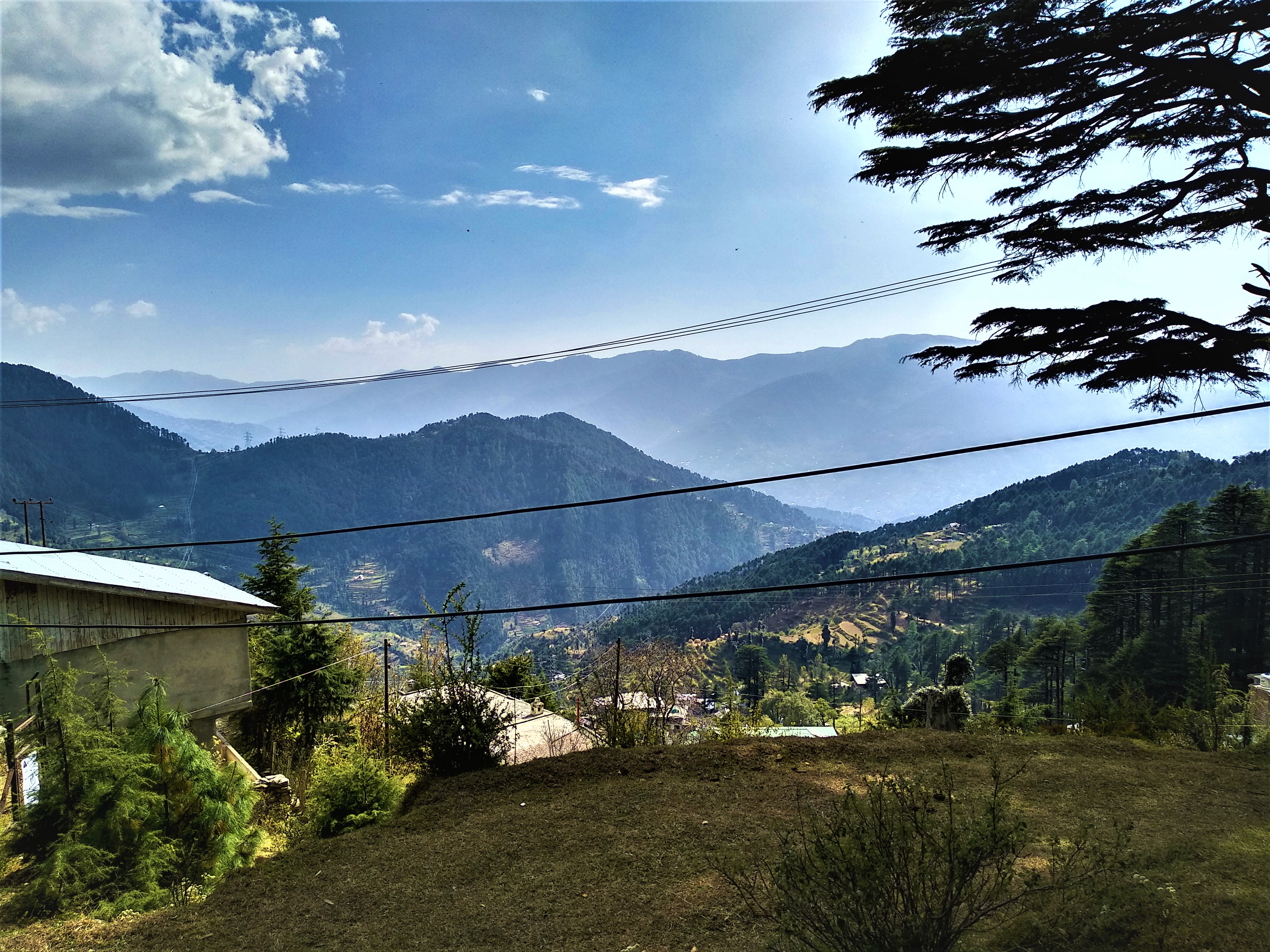
Patnitop Mountains

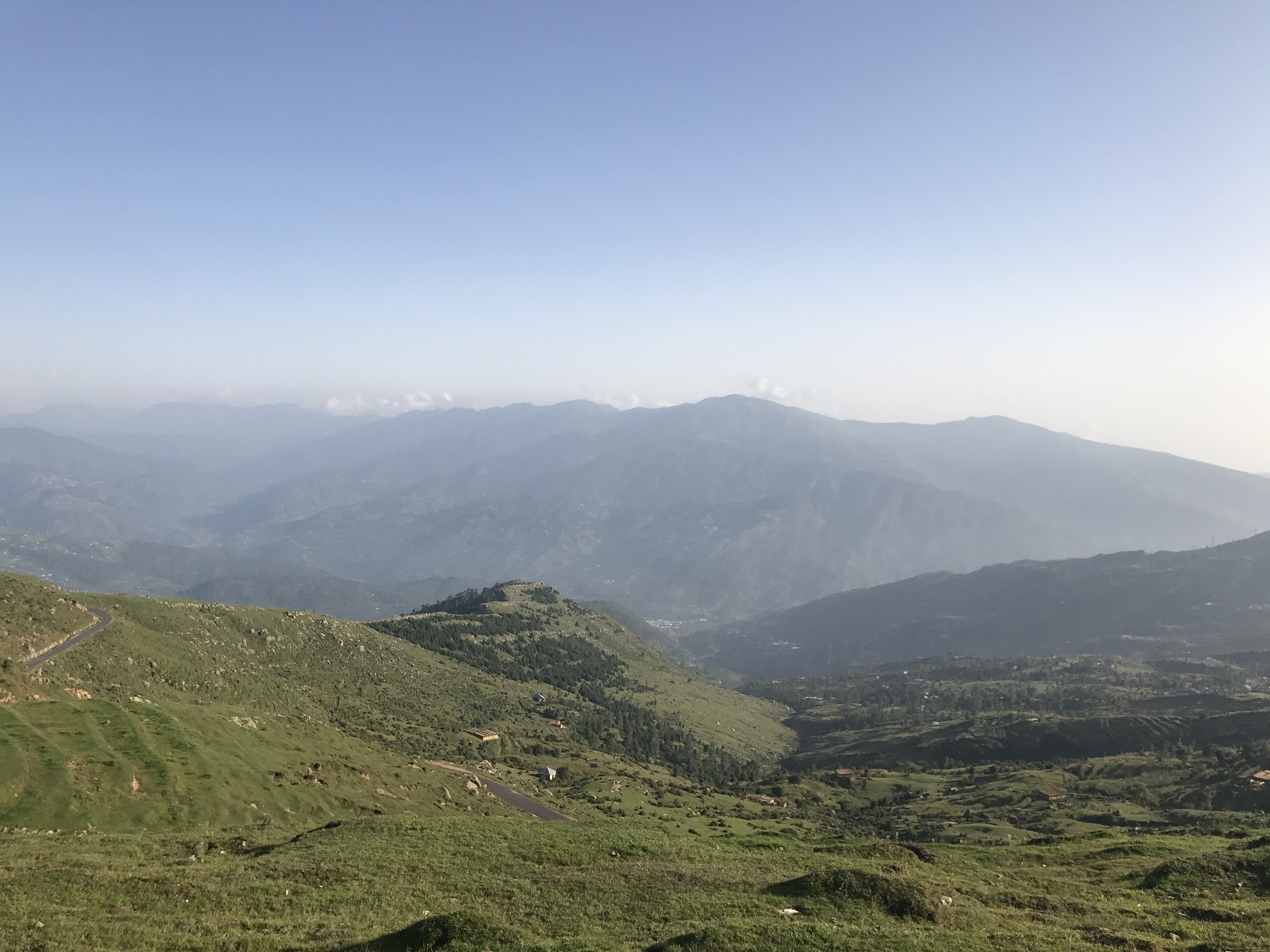
Patnitop
