= Devigol =

Hill Station in Jammu and Kashmir

Devigol Padras - Dhal Padran
- Hill Station
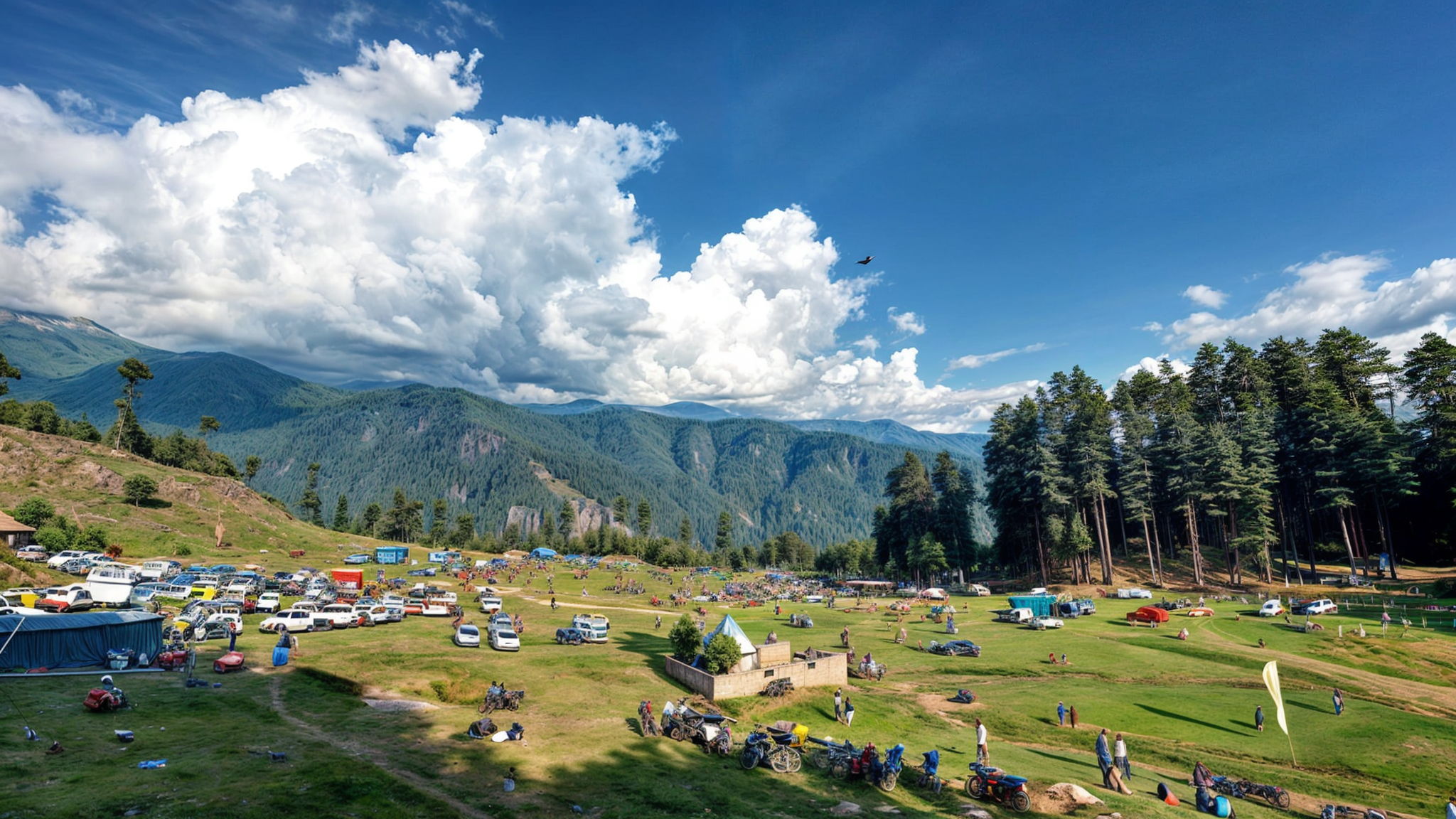
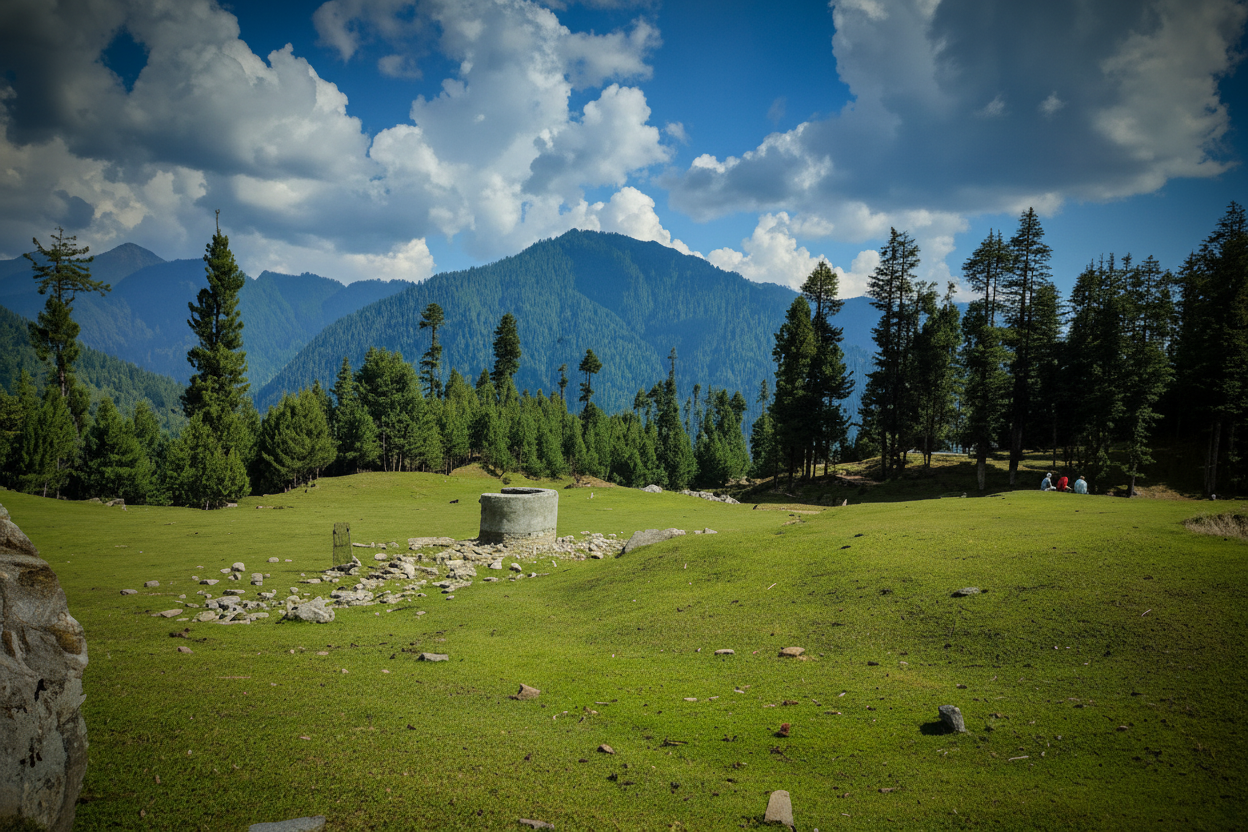
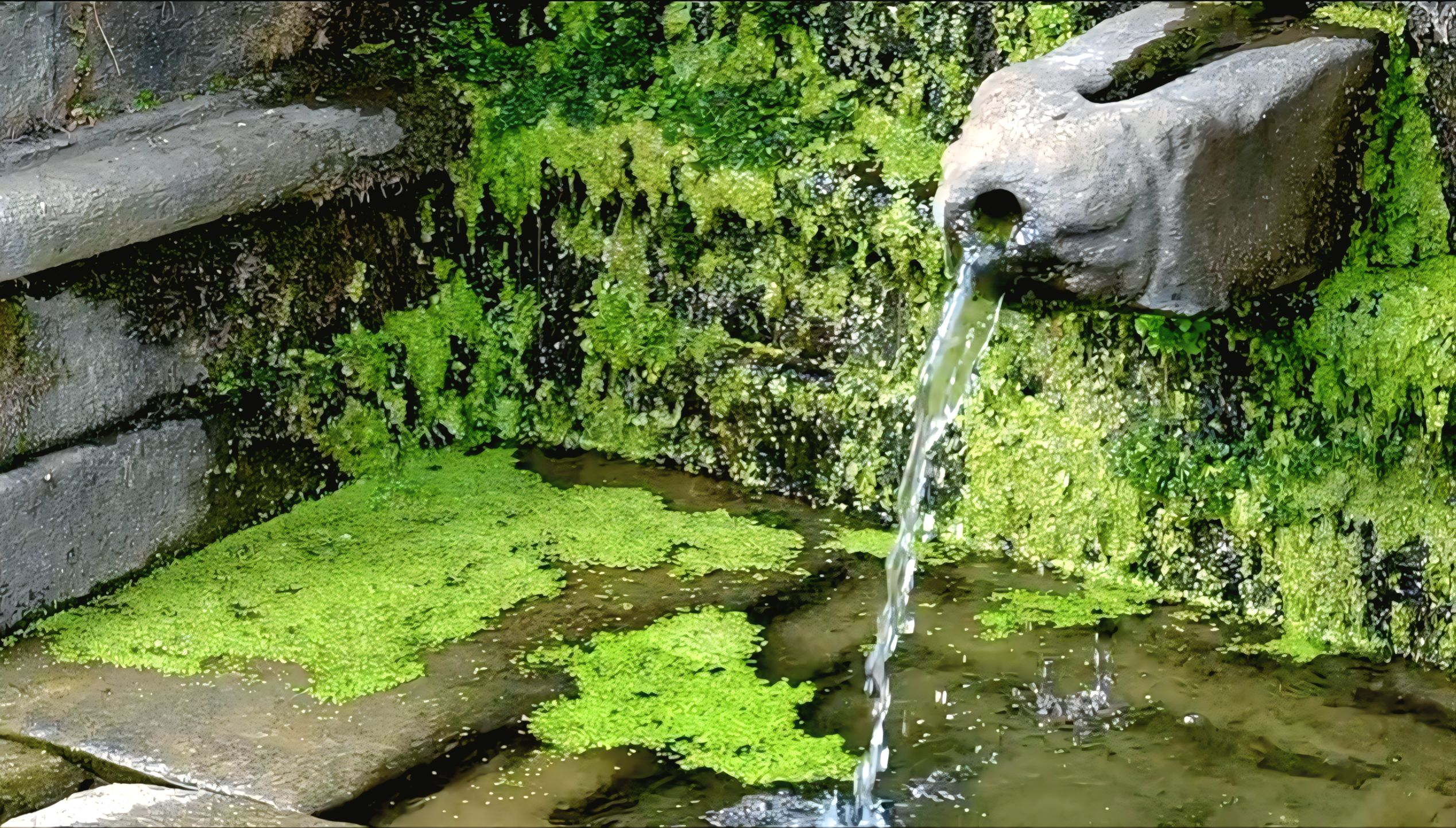
- View Of Devigol Eid Gah Devigol Water Spring Devigol Bunjwah District Kishtwar
- Interactive map of Devigol
- Devigol Bunjwah, Kishtwar, Jammu and Kashmir, India
- Coordinates: 33.1449752°N 75.9651455°E
- Country: India
- State: Jammu and Kashmir
- District: Kishtwar
- Tehsil: Bunjwah
- Village: Patnazi

Languages
  - Official: Urdu and English

Languages
  - Spoken: Kashmiri, Kishtwari, Gojri,

Devigol is a hill station and popular tourist destination in Patnazi Village, Bunjwah, Kishtwar district in the Indian union territory of Jammu and Kashmir.

The Devigol Festival is held there annually.
