= Sanasar =

Tourist destination in Jammu and Kashmir

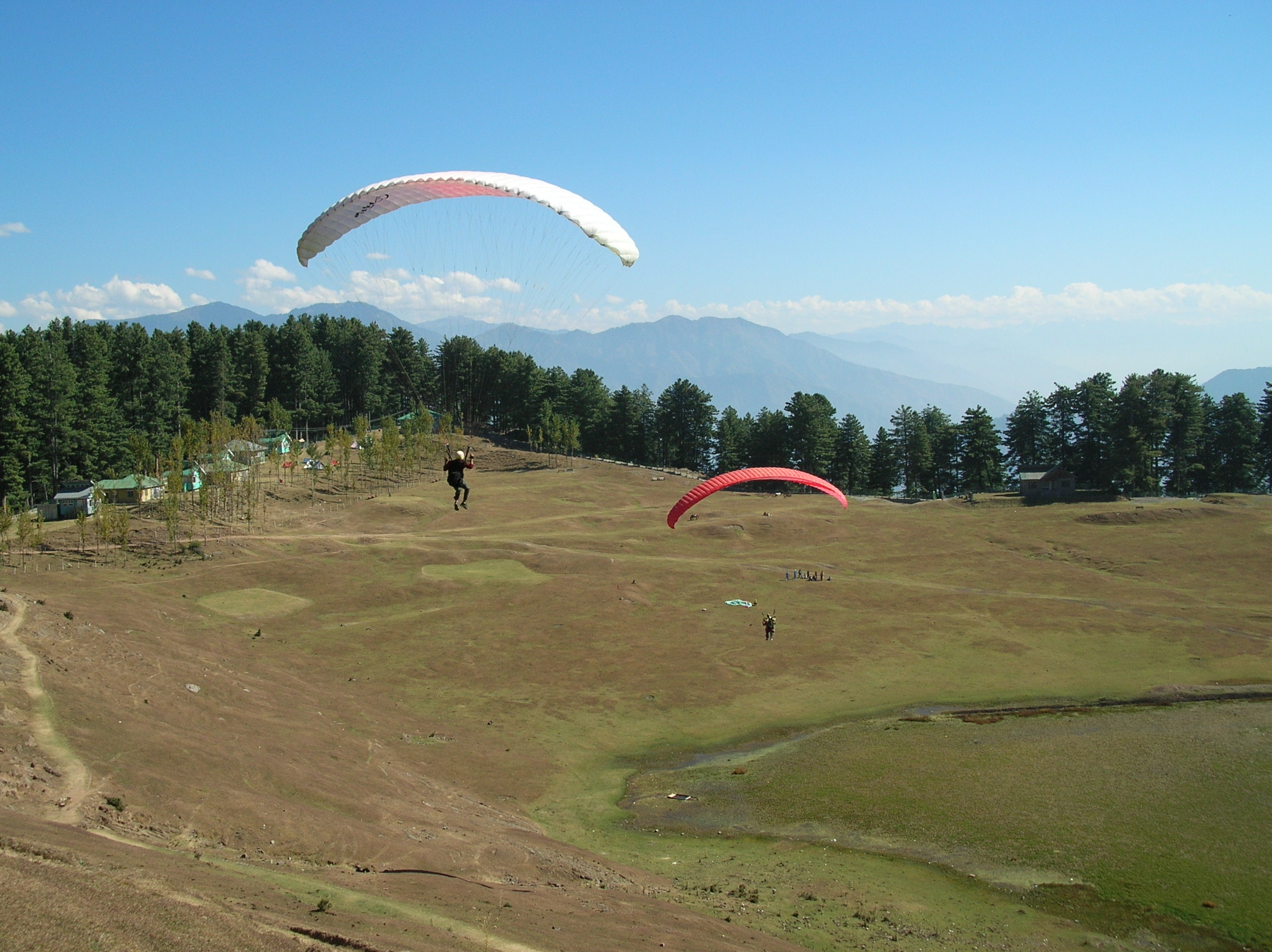
- Paragliding at Sanasar

- Location within Jammu and Kashmir Location within India
- Floor elevation: 6,730 ft (2,050 m)

Geography
- Country: India
- State: Jammu and Kashmir
- Region: Chenab valley
- District: Ramban District
- Coordinates: 33.125°N 75.260°E
- Interactive map of Sanasar

Sanasar is a tourist destination and the name given to the two small villages of Sana and Sar in Ramban District, Jammu and Kashmir, India.

Named after small local lakes, Sana and Sar are located 20 kilometres (12 mi) west of Patnitop, Ramban district on the national highway 1A. At an altitude of 2,050 metres (6,730 ft), it is the hub for adventure and sport activities in the Jammu region. The area is notable for its scenic views of mountain ranges including the Brammah Massif.

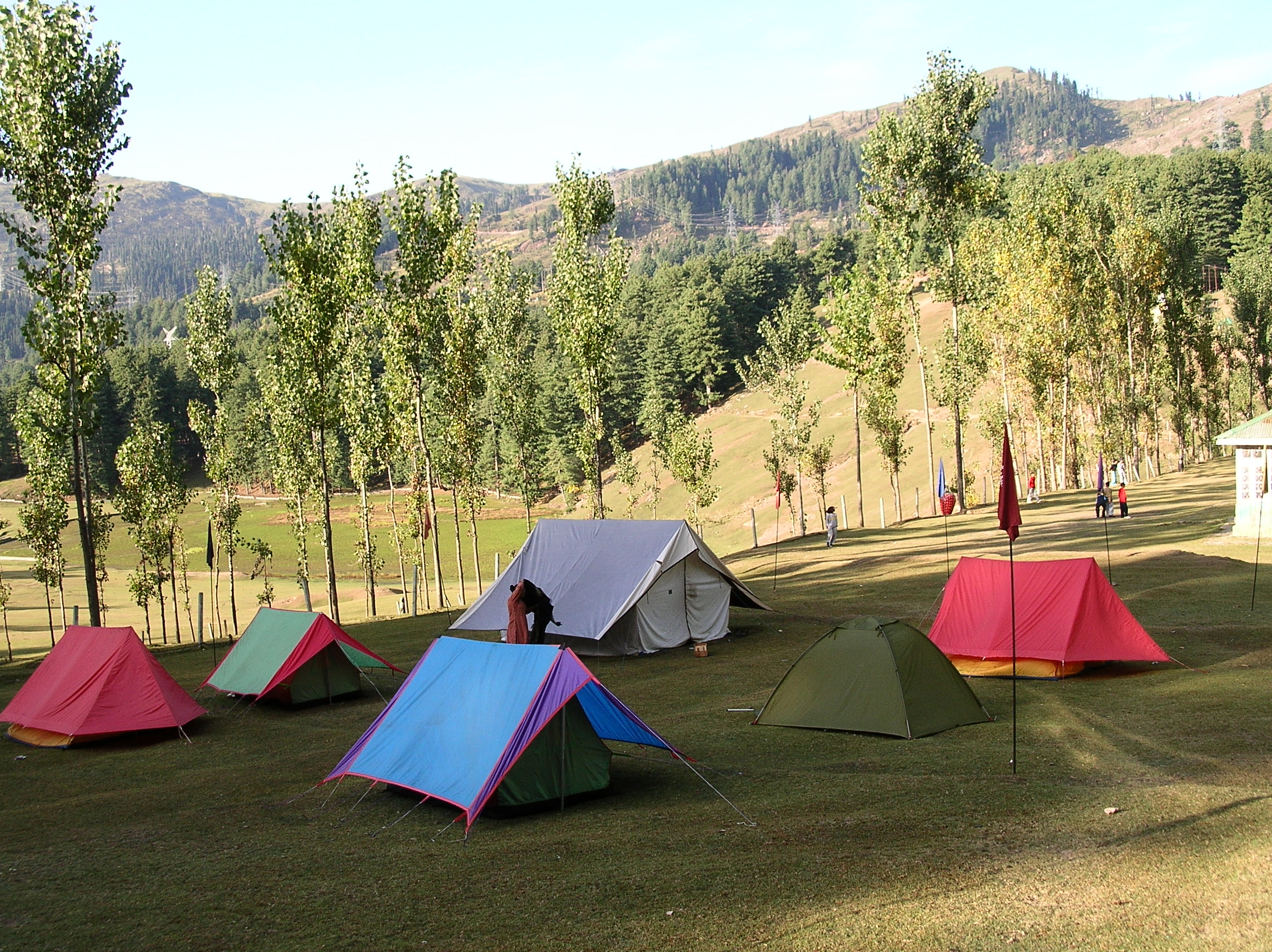
Wilderness Adventure Camp-Sanasar

== Nearby sights ==
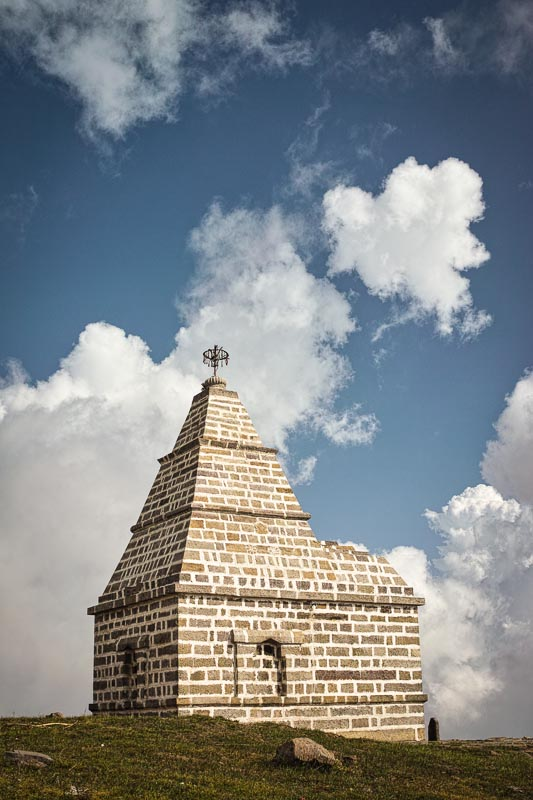
Shankh Pal temple

A nearby mountain range is called the Shanta Ridge. The Shank Pal Temple is located at the highest point of the Shank Pal ridge, at an altitude of 2,897 metres (9,505 ft), a few hours' walk from Sanasar. The 400-year-old temple is dedicated to Nag Shankh Pal. No mortar was used to join the stones of the temple.

Shanta Gala is a pass on the Shanta ridge which offers a view of the Panchari valley on the other side of the ridge. The pass leads to the Lander area.

== Activities ==
Sanasar is a hub for adventure sports in the Jammu region. Activities available include paragliding, camping, zip-lining, horse riding, and boating on Sanasar Lake.

The area also features a Tulip Garden which is a seasonal attraction near Sanasar Lake, drawing visitors during the spring bloom season.
