= Zoji-la Tunnel =

Road tunnel under the Zoji La pass in the Himalayas

- Location within Ladakh Location within Jammu and Kashmir Location within India
- Interactive map of Zoji-la Tunnel

Overview
- Location: Zoji La, Ladakh, India
- Coordinates: 34°16′44″N 75°28′19″E
- Status: Under construction
- Route: NH 1
- End: 2026

Operation
- Work began: 15 October 2020
- Constructed: MEIL
- Operator: National Highways and Infrastructure Development Corporation Limited (NHIDCL)
- Traffic: Motor vehicles

Technical
- Length: 13.153 km (8.173 mi)
- No. of lanes: Two (one in each direction)

Zoji-La Tunnel, the world's longest single-tube bi-directional road tunnel at the highest altitude, is an under-construction Himalayan tunnel in India under the Zoji La pass between Sonamarg in Ganderbal district of Jammu and Kashmir and Dras in Kargil district of Ladakh. This project is being executed by a Hyderabad-based engineering company, MEIL. It is 9.5 m wide, 7.57 m high and 13.153 km long, horseshoe-shaped single-tube, 2 lane road tunnel at the height of around 11,578 feet above sea level. Together with the adjacent Z-Morh Tunnel, this geostrategically important tunnel on the NH1 Srinagar-Leh Highway will provide year around weather-proof connectivity to Ladakh and Baltal (Amarnath cave), reduce the earlier 1-1.5 hours travel time to just 15 minutes drive, boost the tourism and economy, and enhance the logistics of the Indian Armed Forces. It is one of the 31 road tunnels (20 in J&K and 11 in Ladakh) being constructed at a combined cost of INR1400 billion (~US$17.5 billion).

== History ==
In 2013, after Cabinet approved the Zoji-La and Z-Morh road tunnel projects, bid were invited in 2017, and IL&FS Transportation Networks Ltd was awarded the contract with a period of 7 years to construct tunnel.

In May 2018, Prime Minister, Narendra Modi, laid the foundation stone and construction work starts.

In 2019, after the earlier contractor IL&FS went bankrupt, fresh bids were invited, and new construction contract was awarded to the MEIL (Megha Engineering & Infrastructure Ltd) in 2020.

== Benefits ==
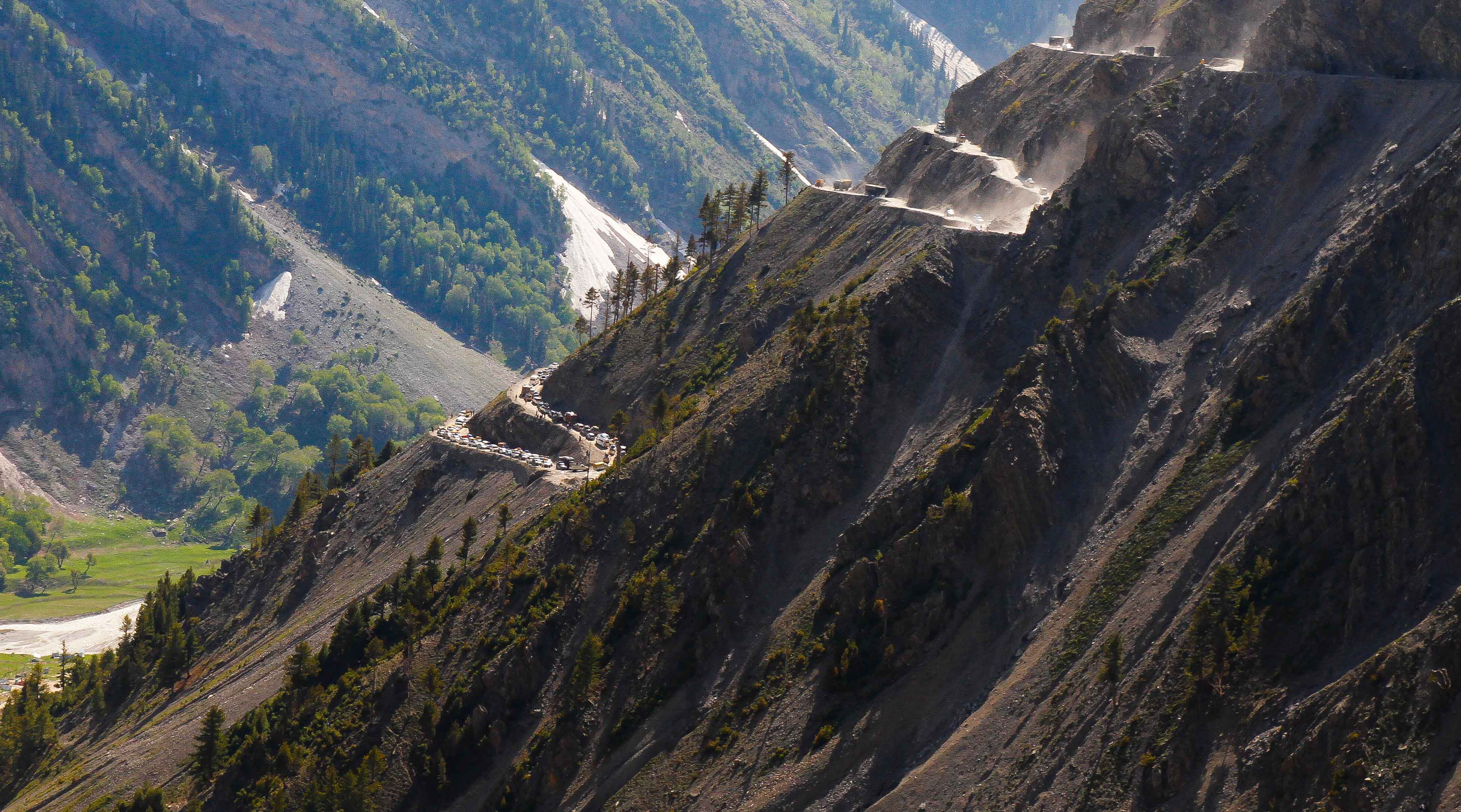
Road to Zoji La Pass from Srinagar

- Shorter travel time: Once the tunnel is completed, travel between Srinagar and Ladakh throughout the year will become possible. The travel time currently between Sonamarg and Meenamarg is four hours, while it will drastically come down to just 40 minutes after this Asia's longest bidirectional tunnel is completed.
- All-weather connectivity: The tunnel along with 6.5 km long Z-Morh Tunnel, (which is 18.457 km before Zoji La tunnel towards Srinagar) will ensure year-round road connectivity between Srinagar and Kargil which currently remains closed for about seven months due to heavy snowfall on the Zoji La pass which is situated at an altitude of ~12,000 feet on the Srinagar-Kargil-Leh highway. Zoji La is 15 km from Sonamarg and provides a vital link with Drass and Kargil in Ladakh but remains closed for 6–7 months (from November to May) during winter due to heavy snow fall & snow avalanches.
- Geostrategic importance for the national security: This tunnel was a strategic requirement of the army and the Ladakhi people, for the pass is close to the Line of Control (LOC) and vulnerable to hostile actions. (Zoji La was recaptured from Pakistani raiders under Operation Bison in 1948.) Defence forces face tremendous logistical difficulties even in ensuring sufficient supplies to isolated border posts for the winter months; more generally, Zoji La is the single most strategic pass for supplying the entire Kargil sector. The tunnel will help keep the highway open throughout entire year.

== Features ==
- Two-lane bi-directional single tube tunnels: The project entails 13.153 km-long two-lane bi-directional single tube tunnel with. The western portal is at Baltal at about 3,000 m elevation (about 400 m lower than the elevation of the existing highway there), about 15 km east of Sonmarg. The eastern portal after Zoji La is at Meenamarg towards the Dras/Kargil end. The length of the tunnel does not include the lengths of the approach roads to both ends of the tunnel from the existing highway.
- Smart and safer tunnel: Planned as a smart tunnel, it will have the latest safety features such as a fully transverse ventilation system, an uninterrupted power supply, emergency lighting, CCTV monitoring, variable message signs, traffic logging equipment and a tunnel radio system. The safety features will include emergency telephones and fire-fighting cabinets every 125 metres, pedestrian cross-passages every 250 metres and motorable cross-passages and lay-bys every 750 metres.
- Constructed in EPC mode: The tunnel will be built under EPC mode (engineering, procurement, construction) wherein the Government of India will provide the money and the executing agency will do the construction and will later hand over the project to the Government of India.
- Revised total cost: is ₹ 8,308 crore including the 5% annual inflation and 4 years maintenance and operation cost.

== Current status updates ==
- 2025 March: According to the MoRTH Minister Nitin Gadkari's update to the parliament, 64% work for Zoji-la Tunnel has been completed with Rs. 3934.42 crore spent out of total budgeted cost of Rs. 6809 crore, revised target completion date is February 2028. Z-Morh Tunnel is already operational.
- 2025 October: 75% complete according to update by MoRTH Minister Nitin Gadkari.
- 2026 May: Excavation is 140 meter away from break through and expected to achieve break through within May 2026, and construction progress in on track to meet the target completion date of February 2028.
- 2026 June 9: Breakthrough in the Zoji-la Tunnel was achieved, marking a major construction milestone. As of this update, approximately 85% of the overall project work has been completed, and the tunnel remains on track for operational commissioning by February 2028.

== See also ==
- India-China Border Roads
