= Dhubri-Phulbari bridge =

Bridge being built in Assam, India

Dhubri-Phulbari Bridge
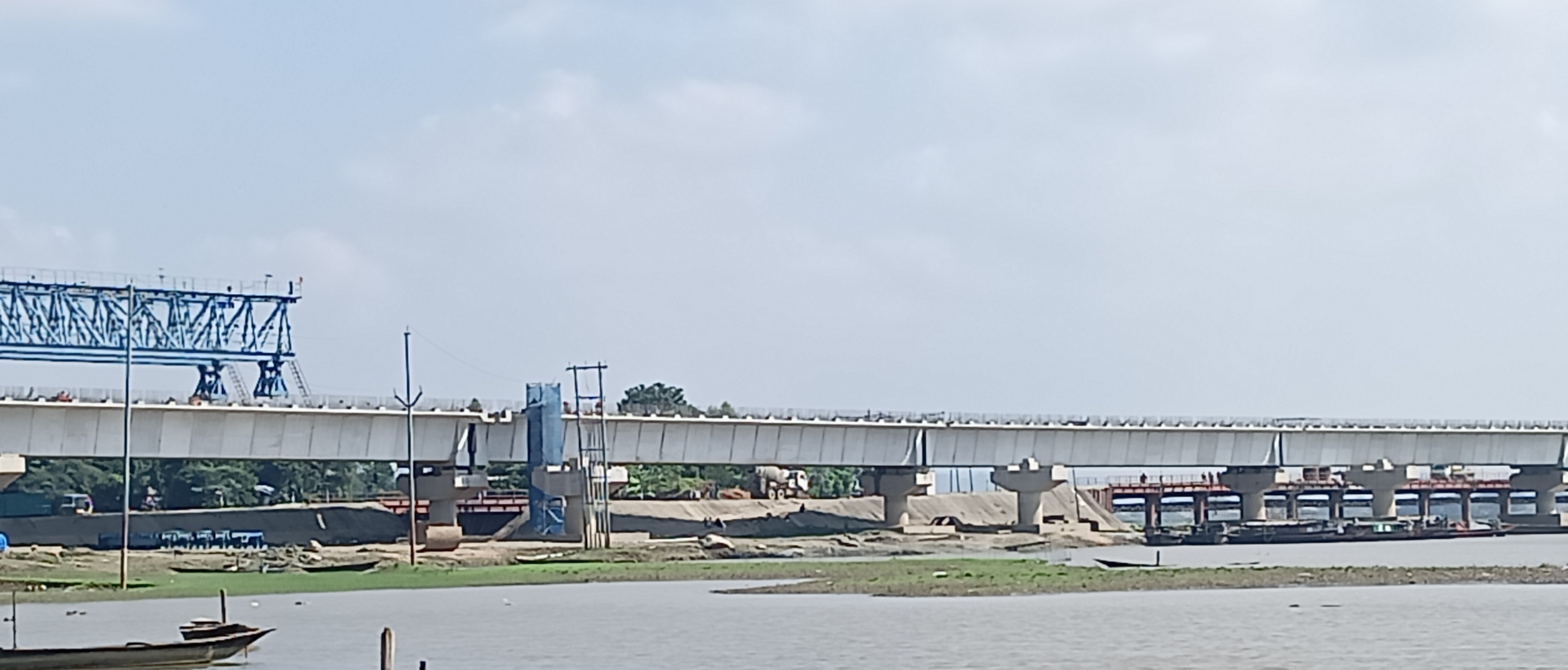
- Phulbari Side
- Coordinates: 25°57′53″N 89°58′48″E
- Locale: Dhubri to Phulbari

Characteristics
- Total length: 19.3 km

History
- Built: Japan International Cooperation Agency
- Opened: 2028

Location
- Interactive map of Dhubri-Phulbari Bridge

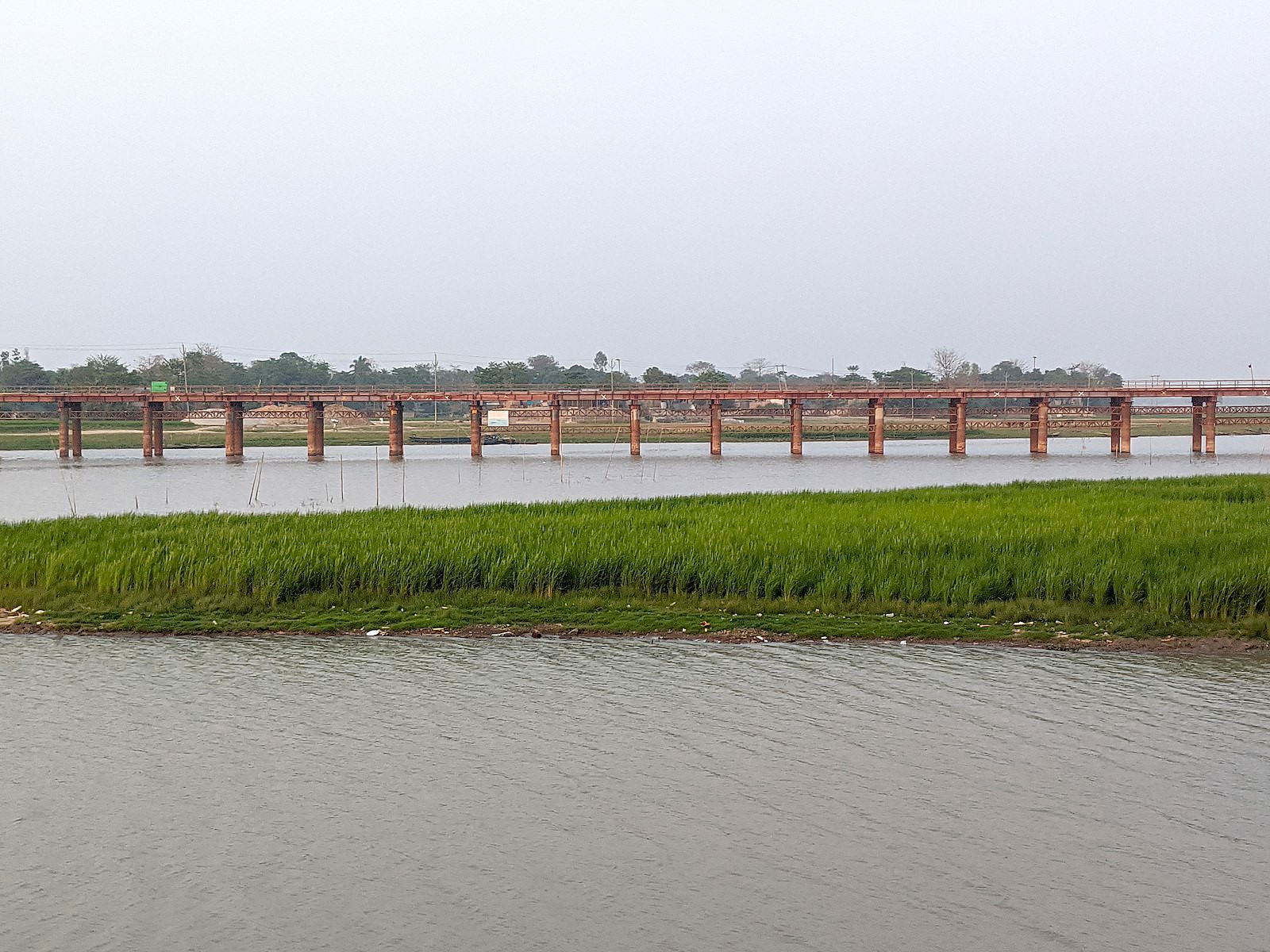
An approach bridge constructed by Lasen&Toubro for the construction of Dhubri Phulbari Bridge

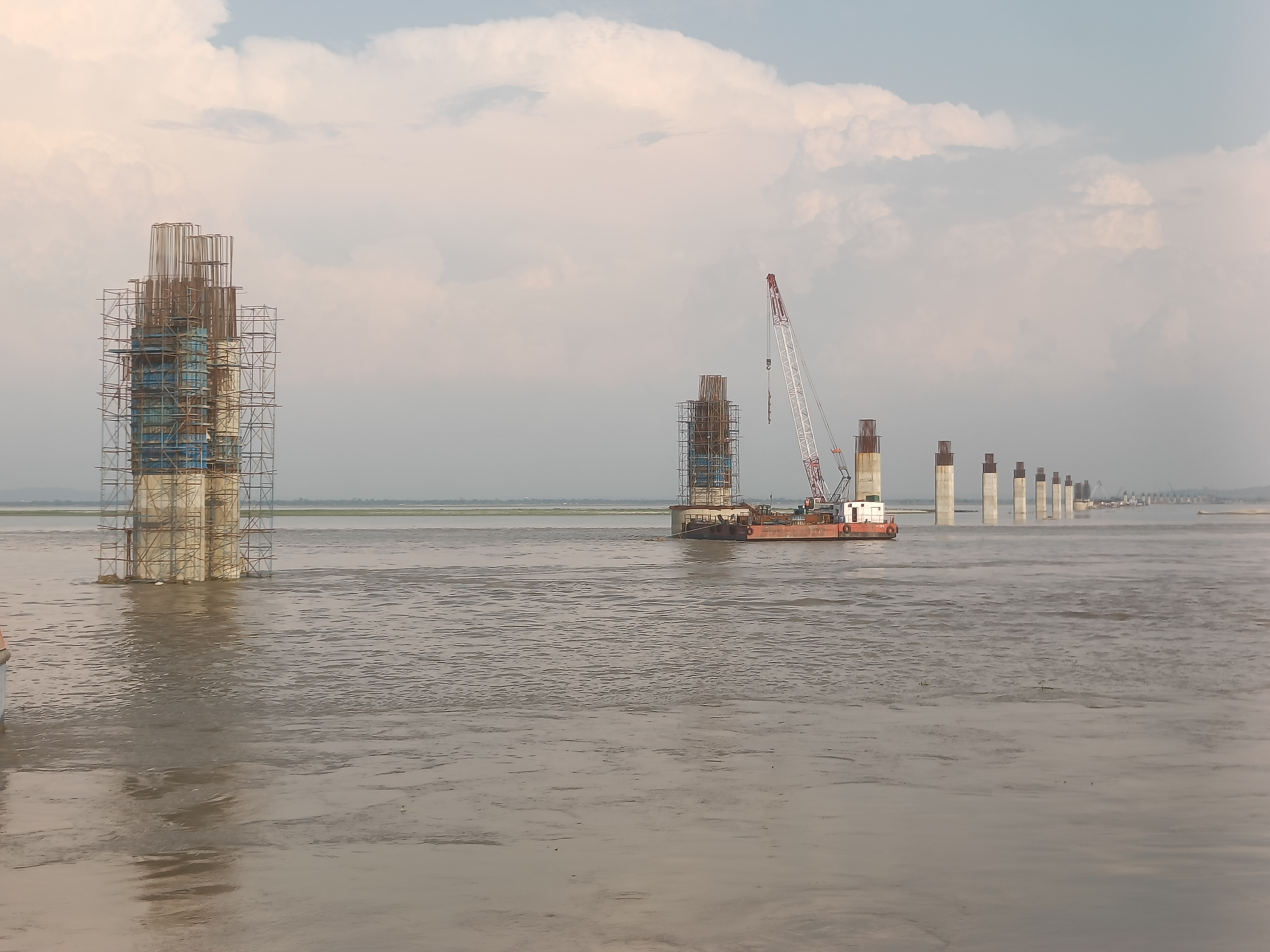
Dhubri Phulbari bridge view from pillar no.125

The Dhubri-Phulbari Bridge is an under-construction four lane extradosed cable stay bridge over the Brahmaputra River between Assam and Meghalaya in North-East India.

The Dhubri-Phulbari bridge, to be completed by 2028, would be India's second longest bridge over water after the Mumbai Trans Harbour Link, and would span more than 19 km. This bridge, close to the Bangladesh border, will connect Assam's Dhubri with Meghalaya's Phulbari. It will fill in a missing link of National Highway 127B, connecting Dhubri by road to Tura, Nongstoin, and other towns in western and central Meghalaya.

Civil works started in 2019–2020. The project is being funded by Japan International Cooperation Agency, and it would be executed by National Highways and Infrastructure Development Corporation Limited. It is one of 6 proposed bridges on the Brahmaputra.

== Construction ==
Larsen and Toubro acquired the construction contract for the project, which will feature a navigation bridge including 12.625 km approach viaducts of 3.5 km on the Dhubri side and 2.2 km on the Phulbari side, connected with approach roads and interchanges on both sides.

The bridge is expected to be built with a total cost of approximately Rs 4,997 crore, will meet the long-standing demand of the people from Assam and Meghalaya who have depended on ferry services to travel between the two banks of the river. It will reduce the distance of 205 Km to be travelled by Road to 19 Km, which is the total length of the bridge.

== Current status ==
By April 2025, Indian media reported about 59% of the work completed. The project remains under active execution by NHIDCL, with supervision from the Union Ministry of Road Transport and Highways. Current plans target final completion and opening around late 2028.

== See also ==
- List of bridges on Brahmaputra River
