= Sonamarg Tunnel =

Road tunnel in the Indian Himalayas

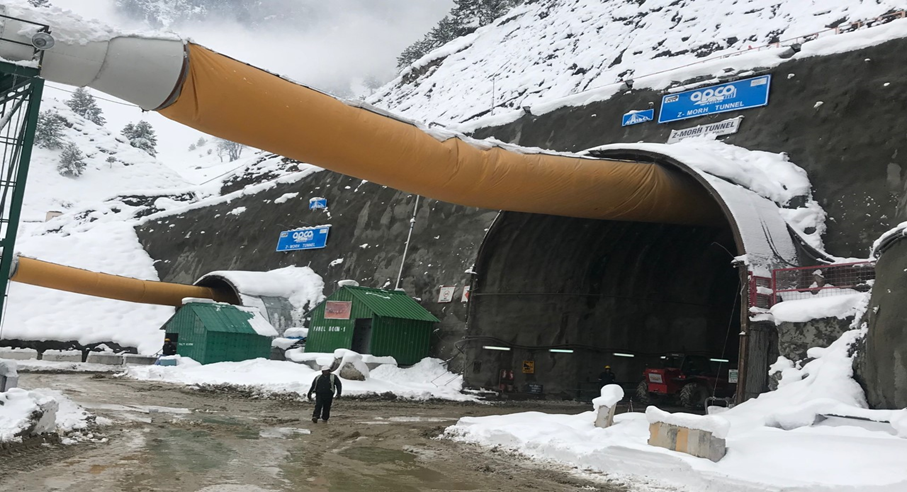
- West portal of Sonamarg tunnel
- Interactive map of Sonamarg Tunnel

Overview
- Other name: Z-Morh Tunnel
- Location: Sonamarg and Ganderbal, Jammu and Kashmir
- Coordinates: 34°18′24″N 75°11′00″E
- Status: Completed
- Route: National Highway 1
- Start: Gagangir
- End: Sonamarg

Operation
- Work began: May 2015
- Constructed: APCO Infratech
- Opened: 13 January 2025
- Operator: NHIDCL
- Traffic: Motor vehicles

Technical
- No. of lanes: Two (one in each direction)

The Sonamarg Tunnel (Hindi: सोनमर्ग सुरंग) is a 6.5-kilometre-long (4.0 mi) road tunnel connecting Gagangir and Sonamarg in Ganderbal district of Jammu and Kashmir, India. It carries two lanes of National Highway 1. It bypasses a Z-shaped stretch of road, which used to be avalanche-prone and get blocked during the winter months due to heavy snowfall. However, now the tunnel provides all-weather connectivity to Sonamarg. It takes only 15 minutes to travel the 6.5 kilometres (4.0 mi) long tunnel compared to hours over the previous zig-zag road.

Together with the adjacent Zoji-La Tunnel, this geostrategically important tunnel provides year-round all-weather connectivity to Baltal (Amarnath cave), Kargil and other places in Ladakh, enhances Indian military logistics and boosts tourism and local economy. It is one of 31 road tunnels, 20 in J&K and 11 in Ladakh, constructed at a combined cost of ₹1.4 lakh crore (~US$17.5 billion).

== Benefits ==
The tunnel lies near Gagangir in Ganderbal District of the Indian Union Territory of Jammu and Kashmir, and has great strategic importance for India as it will provide quicker and year-long access to Zoji La. The older road without this tunnel is vulnerable to dangerous snowfall and avalanches, which necessitates its closure for several months in a year. The Z-Morh Tunnel, along with Zoji-La Tunnel located 325 km west towards Leh, will ensure uninterrupted connection between Srinagar and Kargil. The completion of the Z-Morh tunnel will also significantly reduce the travel time between Srinagar and Leh as commuters will no longer need to stay overnight in Kargil to compete the trip.

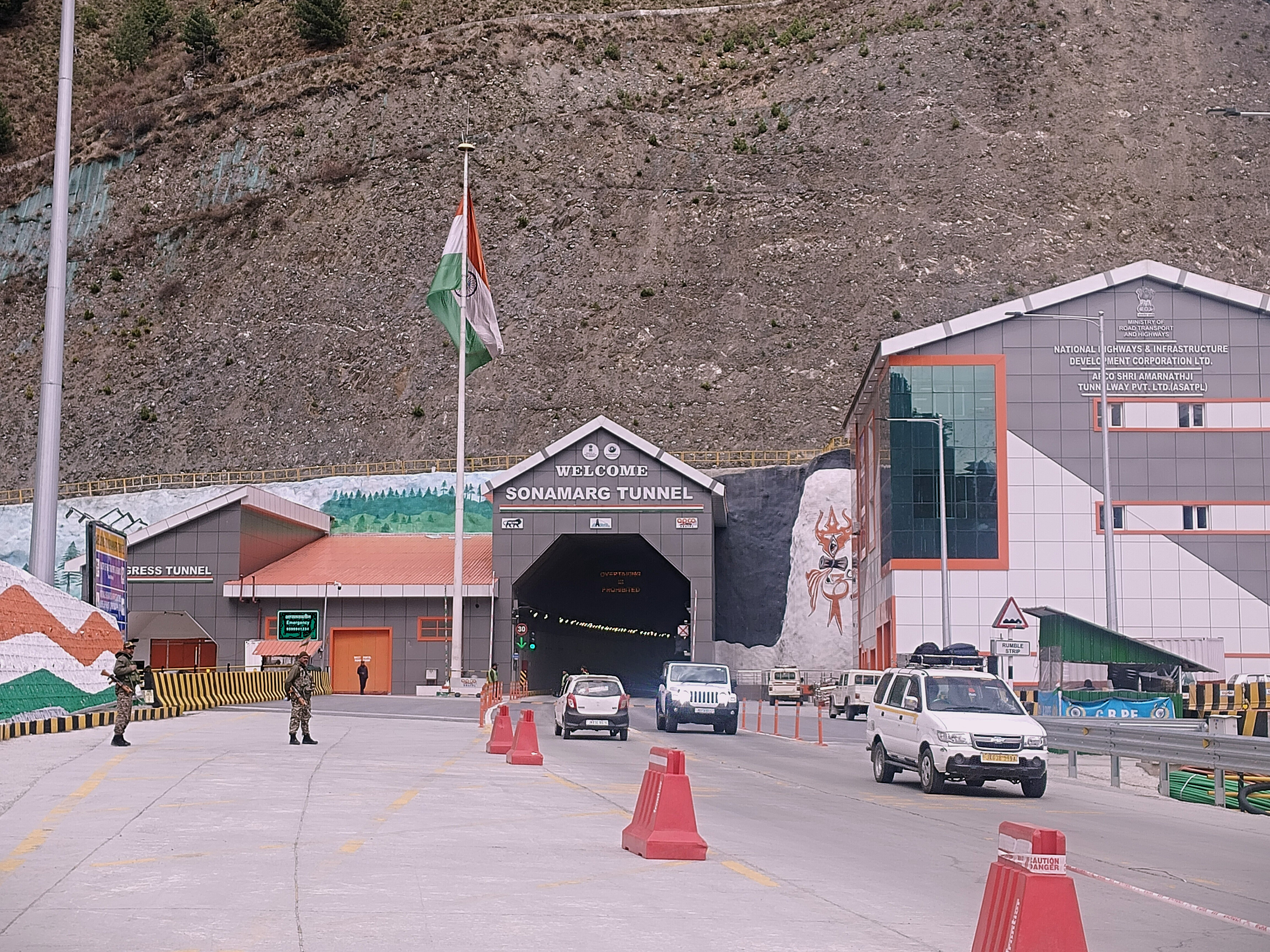
Sonamarg Tunnel

The tunnel will increase social and economic development throughout the region and boost tourism in Sonamarg, which boasts attractions including the Thajiwas Glacier and activities such as whitewater rafting on the Sind River.

== Features ==
- The Z-Morh tunnel is a two-lane bi-directional road tunnel between Gagangir and Sonmarg starting at the 69.5 km stone and ending at the 81.3 km stone on NH 1.
- The tunnel itself is 6.5 km long and the length of the approach roads between the tunnel portals and NH 1 is 6.05 km for both ends.
- The tunnel is 10 metres (33 ft) wide with a 7.5 metres (25 ft) wide parallel escape tunnel to be used both in an emergency and as a railway tunnel.
- The tunnel is designed for the flow of 1,000 vehicles an hour at an approved maximum speed of 80 kilometres per hour (50 mph).
- The tunnel is located at an elevation of 2,637 meters (8,652 ft) above sea level.
- The total capital cost of the project was approved at ₹2,700 crore in July 2012. This includes ₹36.48 crore for the cost of land, resettlement, rehabilitation, and other pre-construction activities.
- The tunnel will help keep the highway open the entire year.
- The western portal of the tunnel (towards Srinagar) is located in the village Rezan just after Gagangir at 34.295291°N 75.197063°E and the eastern portal (towards Sonamarg) is located at village Shetkari at 34.305525°N 75.261309°E. There is a ventilation tunnel at Adit between the two portals.
- The tunneling has been built using NATM tunneling method in view of the fragile Himalayan Geology.

== Development and construction agency ==
Initially, the Z-Morh Tunnel was a US$450 million project being executed under PPP (DFBOT - Design, Build, Finance, Operate and Transfer Mode) by Srinagar-Sonamarg Tunnelway Limited, an Infrastructure Leasing & Financial Services (IL&FS) owned company which was also the concessionaire for the project.

Earlier, the project was envisaged to be implemented by the BRO as owner and nodal agency. However, it was later transferred to NHIDCL for implementation.

ITNL (an IL&FS Group entity) was appointed as the EPC contractor, which in turn appointed Apco - Titan (Joint Venture) as a construction contractor for the project. The work was suspended by the construction contractor in July 2018 due to the financial stress of the concessionaire (IL&FS Group).

The Project Authority (NHIDCL) foreclosed the concession the agreement/contract with Srinagar Sonamarg Tunnelway Limited and reinvited bidding for the construction of the balance work in June 2019. The revised (Balance Work) Total Project Cost stood at ₹2,378 crore (~USD 340 Million). The work was required to be completed in 42 months from the appointed date.

In August 2019, Apco Infratech emerged as the lowest bidder in the International Bidding Process, and in December 2019, the Project Authority issued a Letter of Award (LOA) for the project.

For the development and construction of this PPP project based on an Annuity-based concession (Design, Build, Finance, Operate and Transfer, or DBFOT), Apco Infratech floated a project-specific Special Purpose Vehicle (SPV): Apco Shri Amarnathji Tunnelway Private Limited (ASATPL).

In January 2019, the Concession Agreement between ASATPL and authority was executed, and 24 June 2020 was declared as the contract (concession) start date. In July 2020 it was reported the project will be completed as of June 2021.

Apco Infratech executed all the EPC (Turnkey) work. M/s Amberg was appointed as the tunnel designer and the approach road design work was given to Transys.

== Status updates ==
- October 2012: Minister of Road Transport and Highways Mr CP Joshi along with CM Omar Abdullah and Rahul Gandhi laid the foundation stone of Z morh Tunnel.
- May 2015: Construction work started and APCO Infratech will build this tunnel.
- July 2018: 22% work completed, but the work stalled by the civil contractor (Apco-Titan JV) due to non-payment of bills and severe financial constraints faced by the developer IL&FS Group.
- October 2018: Government supersedes board of IL&FS Group in view of “financial crisis”.
- March 2019: IL&FS Group requested authority NHIDCL to foreclose the contract. NHIDCL accepted the request and the process of foreclosure initiated.
- June 2019: NHIDCL re-invited bids on DBFOT Annuity Basis for selection of a new contractor for the completion of remaining work with 1 August 2019 as the bid submission date. The revised total project cost is estimated (for balance work) at ₹2,378 crore.
- August 2019: APCO Infratech wins the contract of ₹2,378 crore and will develop the tunnel (balance work) under BOT (annuity) mode. Tunnel will be built in 3.5 years with target completion by December 2023.
- July 2020: Work by new contractor APCO Infratech restarted. Both end of the tunnel were through by end of June 2021.
- September 2021: After inspecting the construction, the Union Minister Nitin Gadkari announced the tunnel will be partially opened for controlled traffic (for military and emergency services) by November 2021.
- 10 April 2023: Minister Nitin Gadkari, the Lieutenant Governor of Jammu and Kashmir and Members of Parliament inspected the tunnel. The Minister said the tunnel is planned to be commissioned by the end of 2023. The Z-Morh tunnel will provide all-weather connectivity to the Sonamarg tourist town.
- 13 January 2025: The tunnel is inaugurated by Prime Minister Narendra Modi and put into operation.

== See also ==
- Lists of tunnels
- Atal Tunnel under Rohtang Pass
- Chattergala Tunnel
- Dr. Syama Prasad Mookerjee Tunnel between Chenani and Nashri (Patnitop) on NH 44 Jammu-Srinagar Highway
- India-China Border Roads
- Victory Tunnel in Shimla
- Zoji-la Tunnel
