= Indian states ranking by number of vehicles =

This is a list of Indian states and territories ranked according to the number of registered motor vehicles per 1000 population, as of 2011–2012. Although vehicle ownership is steadily rising, India has a relatively low vehicle per population ratio. Chandigarh had the highest, at 702 per thousand people, while Bihar had the lowest at 31 vehicles per thousand people.

== List ==
The list is compiled from the Road Transport Yearbook 2011–2012 published by Ministry of Road Transport and Highways, Government of India.

Rank	State or union territory	Registered Motor Vehicles per 1,000 population: 2011–2012
1	Chandigarh	702
2	Puducherry	521
3	Goa	476
4	Kerala	425
5	Delhi	387
6	Punjab	324
7	Daman and Diu	302
8	Tamil Nadu	257
9	Gujarat	241
10	Haryana	231
11	Dadra and Nagar Haveli	228
12	Karnataka	182
13	Maharashtra	171
14	Andaman and Nicobar Islands	152
15	Andhra Pradesh	145
16	Rajasthan	130
17	Lakshadweep	129
18	Nagaland	128
19	Chhattisgarh	126
20	Uttarakhand	123
21	Arunachal Pradesh	121
22	Madhya Pradesh	111
23	Himachal Pradesh	107
24	Mizoram	100
25	Jharkhand	99
26	Odisha	91
27	Manipur	87
28	Jammu and Kashmir	77
29	Uttar Pradesh	76
30	Meghalaya	75
31	Sikkim	70
32	Assam	58
33	Tripura	56
34	West Bengal	43
35	Bihar	38

== Number of Vehicles by States and Union territory ==
TOTAL REGISTERED MOTOR VEHICLES IN INDIA (STATE-WISE) (in thousands)
Stat	2008	2009	2010	2011	2012	2013	2014	2015
Andhra Pradesh	7208	8059	8923	10189	12424	6286(R)	7002	7882
Arunachal Pradesh	22*	22*	22*	145	151	151#	151#	151#
Assam	1116	1235	1384	1582	1807	1878	2217	2510
Bihar	1739	1960	2357	2673	3113	3617	4163	4778
Chhattisgarh	1935	2115	2436	2766	3104	3437	3871	4314
Goa	624	674	727	790	866	938	1009	1084
Gujarat	10289	10999	11873	12993	14414	15772	17092	18721
Haryana	3973	4425	4792	5377	5978	6600	7239	7928
Himachal Pradesh	371	494	538	622	737	876	974	1077
Jammu & Kashmir	620	668	739	927	917	1021	1133	1244
Jharkhand	1850	2038	2767	3113	3158	3417	1719	2066
Karnataka	6217	6953	9044	9930	10910	12064	13335	14785
Kerala	4430	4860	5398	6072	6893	7858	8775	9648
Madhya Pradesh	5523	6011	6591	7356	8144	8760	9722	11141
Maharashtra	13335	14451	15768	17434	19432	21488	23394	25562
Manipur	147	147	194	207	215	296	395	307
Meghalaya	128	142	158	176	198	220	248	267
Mizoram	66	70	80	93	102	121	137	151
Nagaland	226	240	254	273	291	311	318	334
Orissa	2370	2607	2932	3338	3759	4216	4702	5219
Punjab	4573	4832	5274	5,274 &	6263	6263#	6263#	6263#
Rajasthan	5902	6490	7166	7986	8985	10072	11133	12379
Sikkim	26	29	34	39	43	36	40	43
Tamil Nadu	11930	12891	14062	15638	17412	19232	20864	22519
Telangana						6376	7073	7845
Tripura	131	144	160	188	204	245	256	282
Uttarakhand	731	787	831	997	1244	1460	1640	1827
Uttar Pradesh	9826	10779	11988	13287	15445	17048	19115	21636
West Bengal	2762	3044	2747	3261	3861	6111	6745	7403
TOTAL STATES	98072	1,07,163	1,19,240	1,32,725	1,50,070	1,66,171	180725	199365
Union Territory
A. & N. Islands	53	60	62	69	77	85	94	102
Chandigarh	712	747	949	1008	1058	1106	631	676
D. & N. Haveli	58	63	69	76	85	93	103	112
Daman & Diu	68	70	72	78	85	92	95	100
Delhi	5899	6302	6747	7228	7350	7785	8293	8851
Lakshadweep	7	7	8	9	10	11	13	14
Puducherry	484	538	599	673	755	700	751	803
TOTAL UTs	7281	7788	8506	9140	9420	9873	9979	10658
GRAND TOTAL	1,05,353	1,14,951	1,27,746	1,41,866	1,59,491	1,76,044	1,90,704	2,10,023
