= Sirbal Peak =

Mountain in Jammu and Kashmir, India

- Location within Jammu and Kashmir

Highest point
- Elevation: 5,237 m (17,182 ft)
- Prominence: 328 m (1,076 ft)
- Coordinates: 34°18′55″N 75°23′44″E

Geography
- Location: Kashmir Valley, India
- Parent range: Himalayas

Climbing
- First ascent: Never been climbed
- Easiest route: Kokarun Nar South face

Sirbal Peak is a mountain with a peak elevation of 5,235 metres (17,175 ft), in the Ganderbal district of the Indian union territory of Jammu and Kashmir, in the vicinity of Sonamarg. Sirbal Peak is part of the Himalaya Range, and is located between Sonamarg and Baltal. It lies 102 km northeast from Srinagar, 5 km from Sonamarg in the east. Sirbal Peak lies 6 km west of Zojila. It rises from a glacier 5 km ahead from Sonamarg on left side of NH 1D. The melt waters from the glacier add to the flow of Nallah Sindh.

Sirbal Peak is visible from Sonamarg head towards north and from Nichinai pass towards east.

== Climbing history and routes ==
Sirbal Peak is among the peaks which stands unclimbed. It was first surveyed by a British medical team headed by Dr Ernest Neve in 1912, who surveyed most of the peaks of this Himalayan range A Scottish Colonel N. N. L. Watts made an attempt in the second week of June 1933. He had attained more than 15000 feet, but he was caught in the bad weather and had to descend to the base camp Baltal along with his partner a local man hailing from Sopore.

The easiest route to climb Sirbal Peak is from the south face which is accessible from Srinagar by road.
