= Krishansar Lake =

Lake in Jammu and Kashmir, India

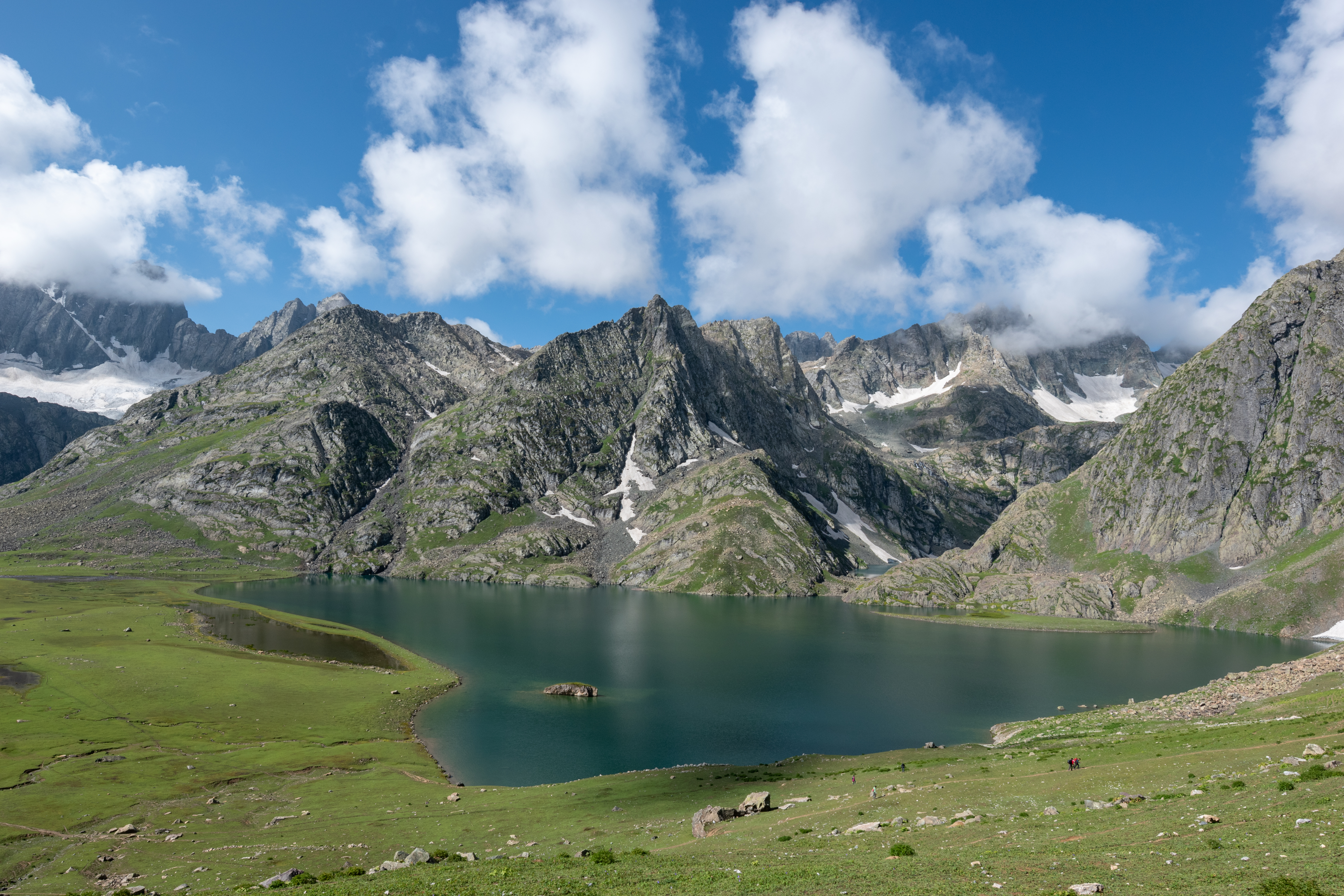

- Location within Jammu and Kashmir
- Location: Ganderbal district, Jammu and Kashmir, India
- Coordinates: 34.397072°N 75.100447°E
- Type: oligotrophic lake
- Primary inflows: Melting of snow
- Primary outflows: Vishansar Lake, Kishanganga River
- Max. length: 0.95 kilometres (0.59 mi)
- Max. width: 0.6 kilometres (0.37 mi)
- Surface elevation: 3,710 metres (12,170 ft)
- Frozen: December to April

The Krishansar Lake or Krishan Sar (lit. 'lake of Krishna') is a high elevation oligotrophic lake located in the Himalayas of Jammu and Kashmir in India. It is situated near the tourist town of Sonamarg, in the Ganderbal district, at an elevation of 3,710 metres (12,170 ft) less than one kilometer northwest of Vishansar Lake which it outflows into, and has a maximum length of 0.95 km and maximum width of 0.6 km.

== Etymology, geography ==
Krishansar in Sanskrit and Kashmiri means the lake of Krishna. It is home to many types of fishes among of which is the brown trout. It freezes during winter, and is inaccessible during this season due to heavy snowfall. It is surrounded by green lush meadows and attracts local shepherds who graze their flocks of sheep and goat during summer. The Krishansar Lake is adjacent to Vishansar Lake, at its back are the mountains standing covered with snow in which lies the Gadsar Pass, a mountain pass which leads to the Gadsar Lake. The lake is a famous trekking site just north of the Kashmir Valley. It is mostly fed by melting of snow and glaciers. It drains out through a small stream which falls into the Vishansar Lake and gives rise to Kishanganga River.

== Access ==
The Krishansar Lake is situated 115 km. northeast from Srinagar and 35 km from Shitkadi Sonamarg. It can be accessed from Srinagar or Srinagar Airport 80 km by road NH 1D up to village Shitkadi from which ponies can be hired to cover an alpine trek of 35 km to reach the Krishansar Lake, which takes a complete day of trekking passing Nichnai Pass of 4100 meters above sea level. The Gadsar Lake is some 9 kilometers in the north westwards. The best time to visit the lake is from the month of June to September.

== Gallery ==
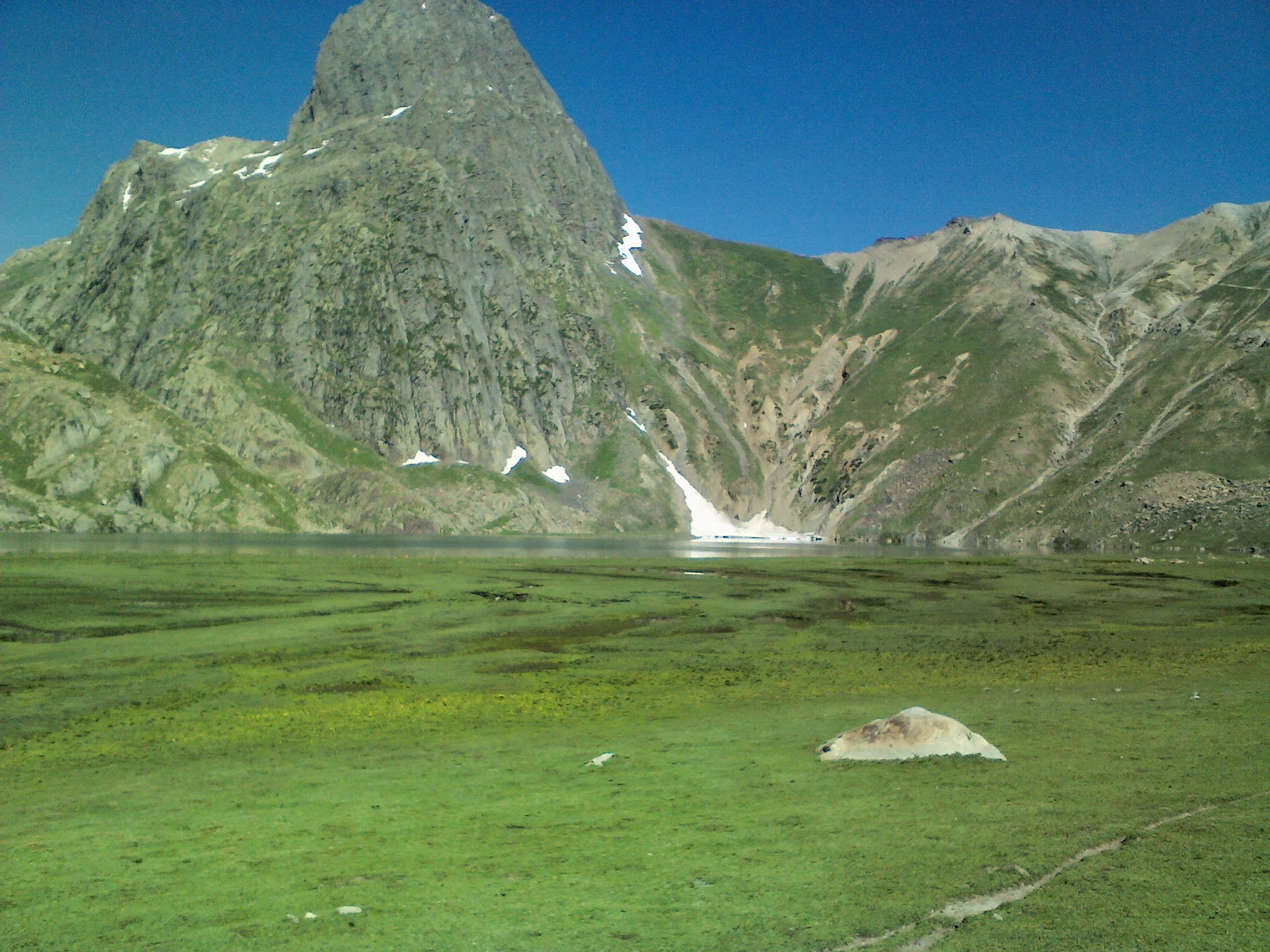

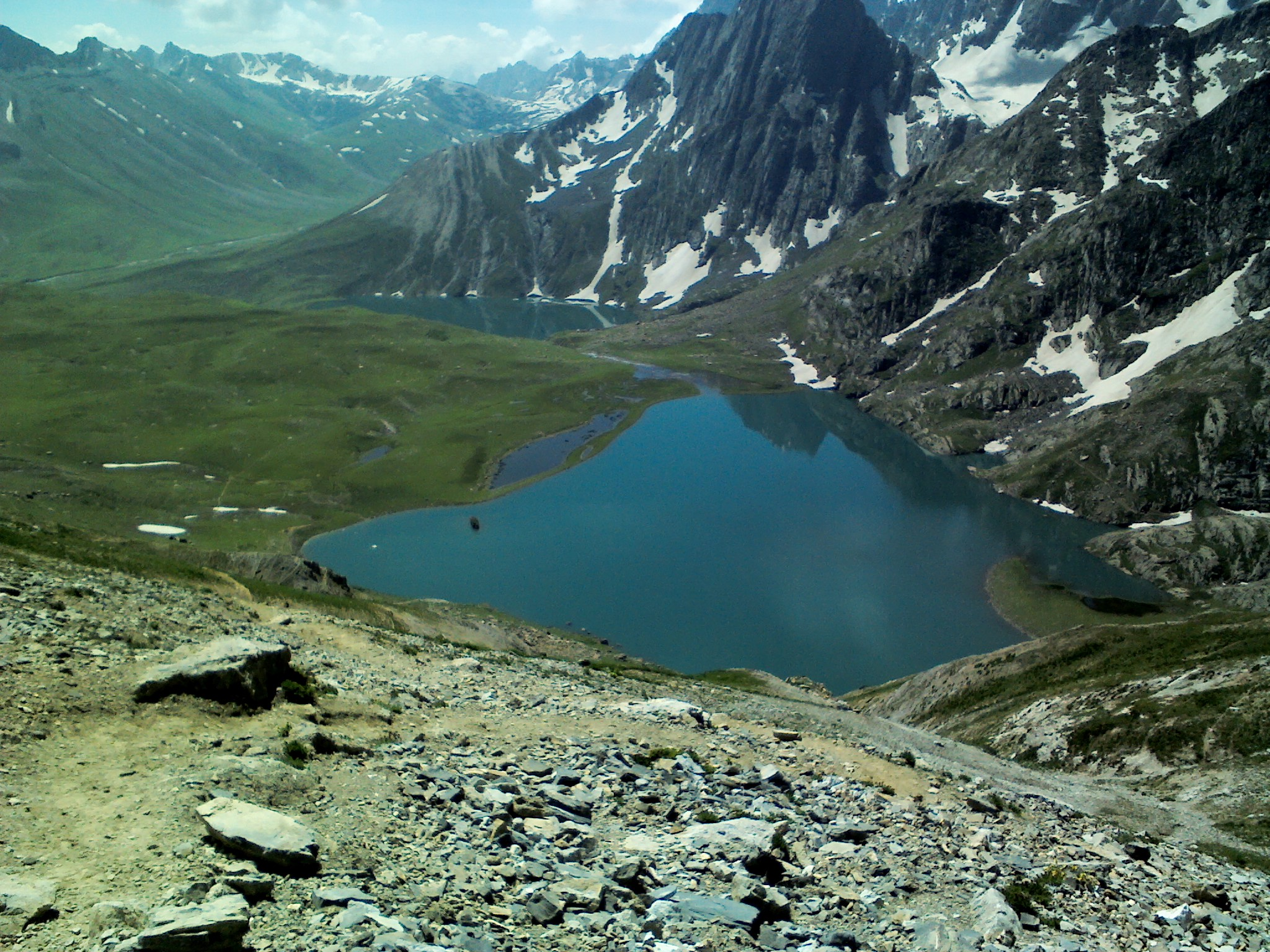

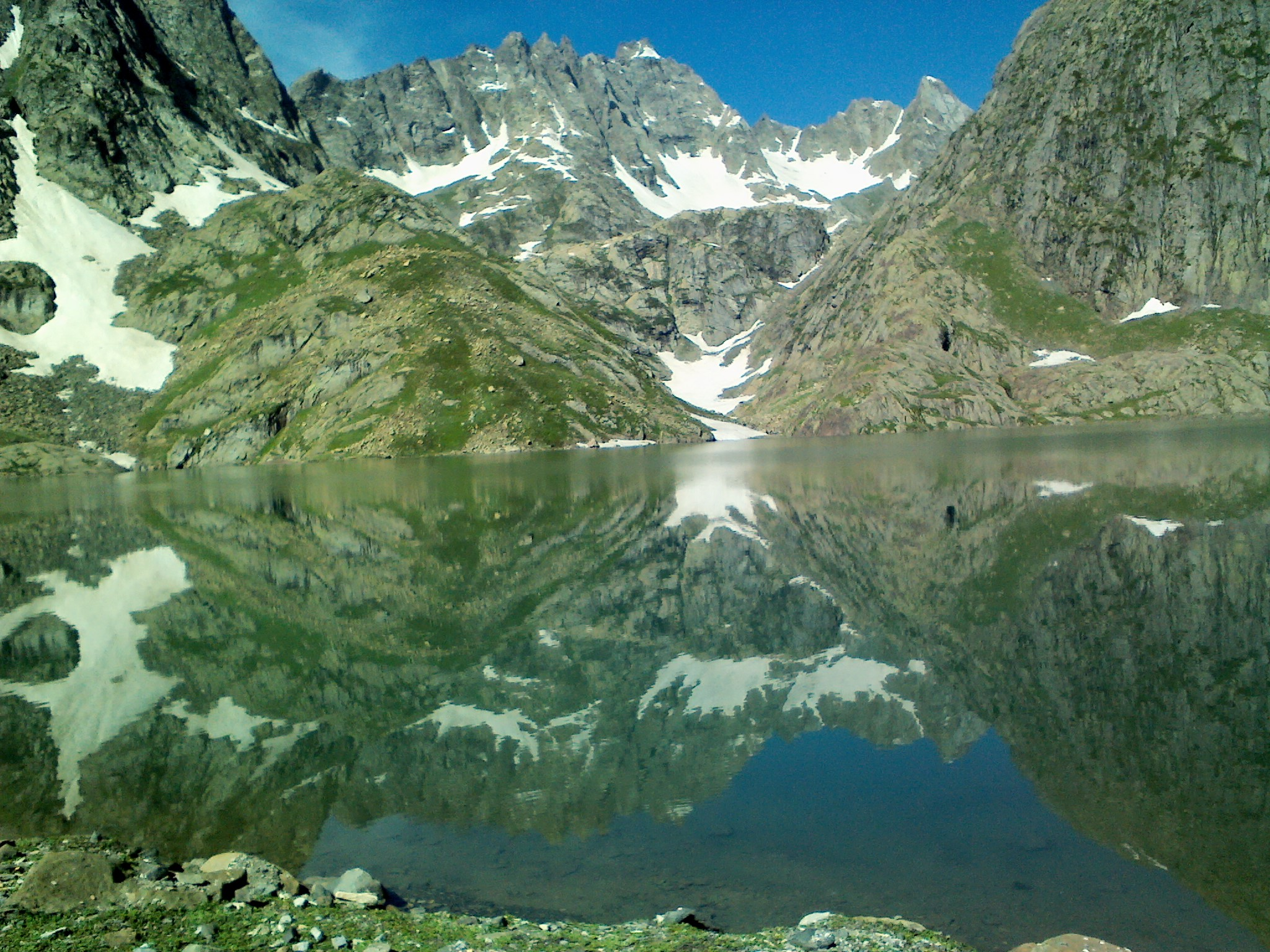

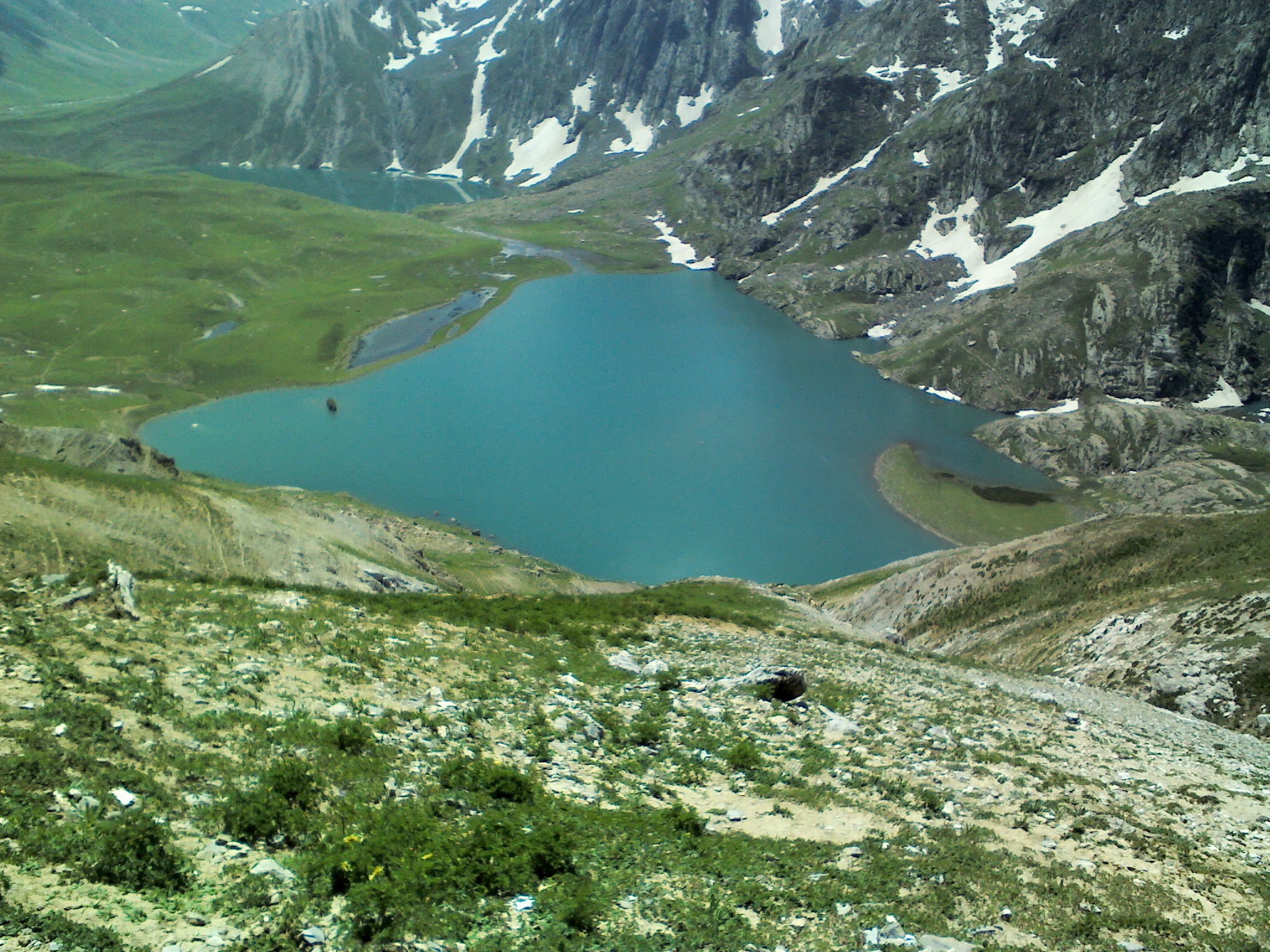
