= National Highways and Infrastructure Development Corporation Limited =

Indian government owned company

National Highways & Infrastructure Development Corporation Limited (NHIDCL)
- Abbreviation: NHIDCL
- Formation: 18 July 2014; 12 years ago
- Type: Central PSU
- Legal status: Active
- Purpose: Development and maintenance of National Highways
- Headquarters: World Trade Centre, Nauroji Nagar, Delhi
- Region served: India Nepal
- Managing Director: Krishan Kumar (IAS)
- Director (Admin & Finance): Anshu Manish Khalkho (IDAS)
- Directors (Technical): Vipnesh Sharma (IES) and Amarendra Kumar (IES)
- Main organ: Board of Directors
- Parent organisation: Ministry of Road Transport and Highways
- Affiliations: Government of India
- Budget: ₹30,000 crore (US$3.1 billion) (2022–23 est.)
- Website: nhidcl.com

The National Highways & Infrastructure Development Corporation Limited (NHIDCL) is a Central Public Sector Undertaking (CPSU) under the Ministry of Road Transport and Highways, Government of India, set up in 2014 and is responsible for management of a network of over 16,000 km of National Highways out of 1,15,000 km in India. It is a nodal agency of the Ministry of Road Transport and Highways (MoRTH). Dr. Krishan Kumar (IAS) is the present Managing Director (MD) of NHIDCL since 14 February 2024.

== History ==
Highways Connectivity corporation. was set up under Act, 2013. The name of the corporation was subsequently changed to National Highways and Infrastructure Development Corporation Ltd. and started functioning w.e.f. 18 July 2014. It was created to develop, maintain and manage the national highways, strategic roads and other infrastructure of India. It was dedicated to the task of promoting regional connectivity in parts of the country which share international boundaries. It is responsible for the development, maintenance and management of National Highways in hilly terrain of North-East part of India, Andaman & Nicobar Islands, Himachal Pradesh, Jammu & Kashmir, Ladakh, Uttarakhand and West Bengal. It works as a specialised agency in high altitude areas and border areas. Apart from highways, NHIDCL is constructing logistic hubs and transport related infrastructures e.g. multimodal transport hubs such as bus ports, container depots, automated multilevel car parking etc. Sh. Anand Kumar (IAS) was the first Managing Director of NHIDCL in 2014.

== Composition ==
- V Umashankar, (IAS) Secretary (MoRT&H) is the ex-officio Chairman of the company. The Board of Directors consists of one Managing Director, Additional Director General is the ex-officio Director (Tech.), one Director (Finance/Administration), three independent part-time Directors and five Executive Directors (Tech.) to oversee timely completion of the projects.
- NHIDCL has 14 Regional Offices (ROs), 46 Project Monitoring Units (PMUs) and about 70 Site Offices (SOs) in 14 States/UTs. ROs are headed by Executive Directors (Projects), PMUs are headed by General Managers/Dy. General Managers, and Site Offices are headed by Managers/Dy. Managers/Project Engineers.
- Below Manager level are Project Engineers who are predominantly responsible for carrying out tasks such as designing, planning, and supervising the construction of highways, tunnels, bridges and other infrastructure projects, ensuring compliance with safety and quality standards, and resolving technical issues related to construction. They work closely with contractors, consultants, and other stakeholders to resolve any issues related to the land acquisition, forest clearance, design, construction, or maintenance of the projects and also ensure that the project is completed within the budget and the given timeline. Project Engineers working at NHIDCL typically have strong technical skills, experience in construction management, and in-depth knowledge of the challenges associated with infrastructure development in extreme weather conditions, including heavy rainfall, snowfall, and high winds, particularly in remote regions of Kashmir or the Northeast.

== Technological Innovation in Road Construction ==
As part of modernizing India’s hill road infrastructure, NHIDCL has embraced several technological innovations to improve construction quality, reduce time, and enhance the safety of road users. Some examples include:

- Geospatial Technology (GIS): NHIDCL uses Geographical Information Systems (GIS) for planning and monitoring construction. GIS helps identify optimal routes, map out the terrain, and assess environmental impact.
- Smart Road Design: Incorporating technologies like solar-powered street lights, variable message signs (VMS) and Advanced Traffic Management System (ATMS)
- Drone Surveying: In difficult terrains, NHIDCL sometimes uses drones for aerial surveys to accurately measure distances, monitor construction progress, and capture real-time data from hard-to-reach areas.
- BIM (Building Information Modelling): NHIDCL has been experimenting with BIM for complex infrastructure projects to create digital representations of physical assets and improve project management.
- Green Roads: NHIDCL has begun focusing on eco-friendly roads. This includes the use of recycled materials (such as plastic waste, fly ash, and cold mix asphalt), which reduces the environmental impact.
- Climate Resilience: With increasing incidents of floods and landslides in regions like the Himalayan foothills and northeastern India, NHIDCL is using slope stabilization technologies, drainage improvements, and flood-resistant designs to ensure roads remain functional during and after extreme weather events.

== Projects ==
India National Highways Map

The NHIDCL (along with BRO) has the task to implement the Special Accelerated Road Development Programme for North Eastern Region (SARDP-NE) in National Highways portion. The SARDP-NE is under implementation in Phases.

- Phase-A: Approved in 2005, it included about 4,099 km length of roads (3,014 km of NH and 1,085 km of State roads). The SARDP-NE Phase ‘A’ is expected to be completed by 2023-24.
- Phase-B: It covers 3,723 km (2,210 km NHs and 1,513 km of State roads) of road. Phase ‘B’ of SARDP-NE shall be taken up after completion of Phase ‘A’.

Notable Road Projects

1. Char dham Project: NHIDCL is taking up several mega projects including the Char Dham Project, which is a significant infrastructure initiative in India aimed at improving connectivity and accessibility to four major pilgrimage sites in the Himalayan region, collectively known as the Char Dham. The project focuses on enhancing the road network leading to the sacred shrines of Yamunotri, Gangotri, Kedarnath, and Badrinath, which hold immense religious and cultural significance for Hindus. The project is estimated to cost Rs 12,000 crore.
2. Imphal-Moreh Road Project: NHIDCL is responsible for the construction of the 65-km-long Imphal-Moreh road project in Manipur. The road will improve connectivity between India and Myanmar and promote cross-border trade.
3. Tawang Road Project: NHIDCL is responsible for the construction of the Tawang road project in Arunachal Pradesh. The road will provide all-weather connectivity to the Tawang district, which is located close to the India-China border.
4. Kailash Mansarovar Road Project: NHIDCL is responsible for the construction of the Kailash Mansarovar road project in Uttarakhand. The road will improve connectivity between India and China, and provide a shorter route for the Kailash Mansarovar Yatra.
5. SASEC Road Connectivity Project: NHIDCL is implementing the South Asia Subregional Economic Cooperation (SASEC) Road Connectivity Project, which involves the upgradation of around 500 km of roads in the North-Eastern region. The project aims to improve connectivity and promote trade and commerce in the region.
6. Sikkim and Himalayan Infrastructure: The state of Sikkim is a prime example of where NHIDCL is actively engaged in building roads through steep terrains and high-altitude areas. A large portion of the work involves bridge and tunnel construction, especially along routes that face extreme weather conditions.

=== Tunnels ===
NHIDCL has been constructing tunnels in challenging conditions since its inception. Some of the big tunnel projects are as under:

- Zoji-la Tunnel: In a strategic push to enhance connectivity and strengthen border infrastructure, India is undertaking the ambitious Zojila Tunnel project near the China border. Nestled amidst the rugged terrain of the Himalayas, the tunnel aims to provide year-round access to the army and residents between Srinagar & Leh. This is the highest tunnel project being taken up in India at a cost of more than Rs.8000 crores. It will be the India's longest road tunnel (13.14 km).
- Z-Morh Tunnel
- Shinkun La Tunnel
- Silkyara Tunnel

NHIDCL has also set up a Center of Excellence for Tunnel Studies (CETS).

=== Bridges ===
NHIDCL has been constructing some of the prestigious bridges in challenging conditions since its inception. Some of the notable projects are as under:

- Dhubri-Phulbari bridge:

This bridge is being constructed across river Brahmaputra on Assam-Meghalaya border. Once complete, it will be the longest bridge in India leaving behind current longest Dhola-Sadiya bridge.

- Mechi Bridge in West Bengal on Indo-Nepal border.
- Maitri Setu (Friendship bridge) in Tripura on Indo-Bangla Border.
- Atal Setu (Rangpo Viaduct) on Sikkim-West Bengal border.

=== Infrastructure Projects ===
Apart from highway projects, NHIDCL has been constructing some mega infrastructure projects also. Some of the notable projects are as under:

- Multi Modal Logistic Parks:

One such MMLP is being constructed at Jogighopa in the state of Assam. It will have a railway siding, jetty, warehouses, business centres at one place to facilitate freight logistics.

- Automated Multi Level Car Parking:

One such A-MLCP has been constructed at Transport Bhawan, New Delhi. It is aimed to address parking problem in congested cities.

=== International presence ===
NHIDCL is providing its services of highway and bridge construction in Nepal.

== Initiatives ==
Apart from maintaining national highways, NHIDCL has developed internet portals for smooth governance. These include followings:

- INAM Pro+: It is a web platform for Infrastructure and Materials Providers. The Portal was formally launched on 10 March 2015.
- INFRACON: It has been developed as a comprehensive National Portal for Infrastructure Consultancy firms & Key Personnel in order to make the evaluation process during procurement more objective, user friendly and transparent.
- ePACE: It is an online tool to monitor and improve the progress of works at the click of a button.

== See also ==
- List of national highways in India
- National Highways Authority of India
- Expressways of India
- State Highways (SH)
- Inland Waterways Authority of India
- Transport in India
