= Vishansar Lake =

Lake in Jammu and Kashmir, India

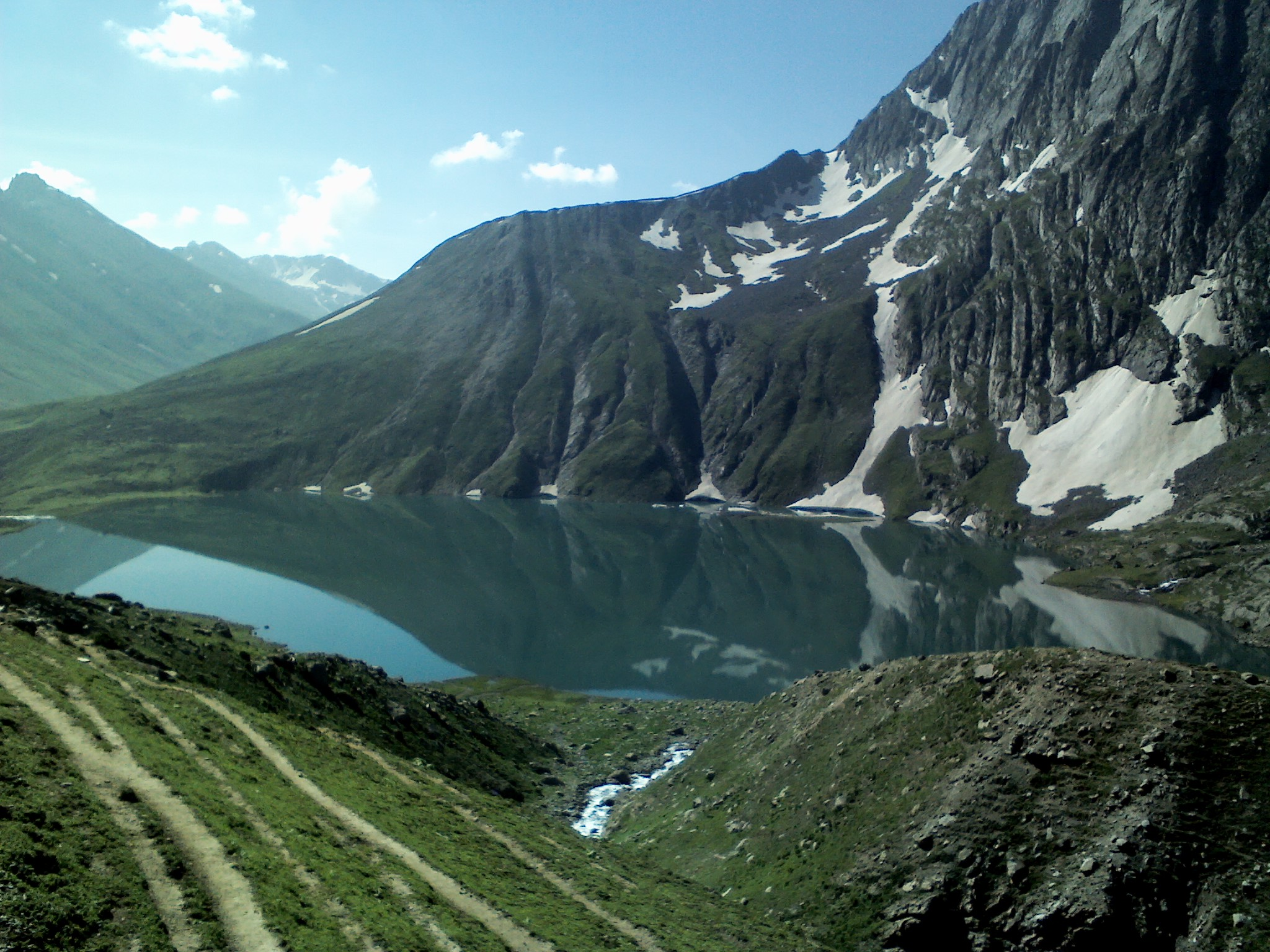

- Location within Jammu and Kashmir Location within India
- Location: Sonmarg, Ganderbal district, Kashmir Valley, Jammu and Kashmir, India
- Coordinates: 34.388119°N 75.11875°E
- Type: oligotrophic lake
- Primary inflows: Krishansar Lake
- Primary outflows: Kishanganga River
- Max. length: 1 kilometre (0.62 mi)
- Max. width: 0.6 kilometres (0.37 mi)
- Surface elevation: 3,710 metres (12,170 ft)
- Frozen: December to April

The Vishansar Lake also known as Vishan Sar (lit. 'lake of Vishnu') is an alpine, high-elevation oligotrophic lake, located near Ganderbal town and Sonamarg in the Ganderbal district of Jammu and Kashmir, India. It lies at an elevation of 3,710 metres (12,170 ft). It has a maximum length of 1km and a maximum width of 0.6km.

== Etymology and geography ==
'Vishansar', in Kashmiri, means the 'lake of Vishnu'. This lake holds religious significance for Kashmiri Pandits. It is home to various species of fish, including the brown trout. The lake remains frozen during the winter months. In summer, the lake is surrounded by lush alpine meadows where local shepherds graze sheep and goats. The lake is a popular destination for trekkers in the Kashmir Valley. Vishnasar is fed by Krishansar Lake and nearby glaciers. The Lake is the source of Kishanganga River, which flows northwards up to Badoab, and then westwards through Gurais, along the Line of Control. Gadsar Lake lies approximately 9 kilometers (5.6mi) to the west, crossing Gadsar Pass.

== Gallery ==
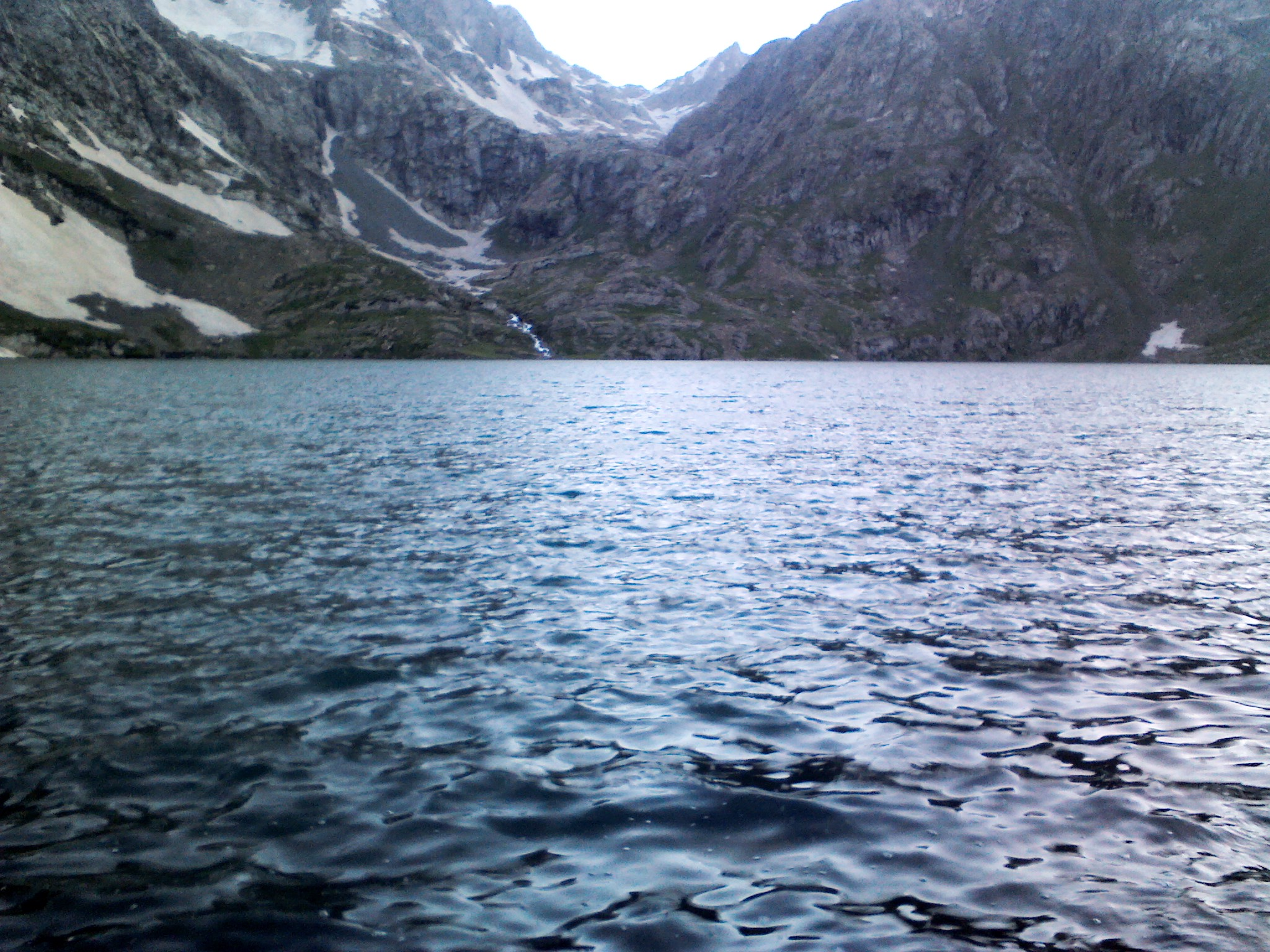

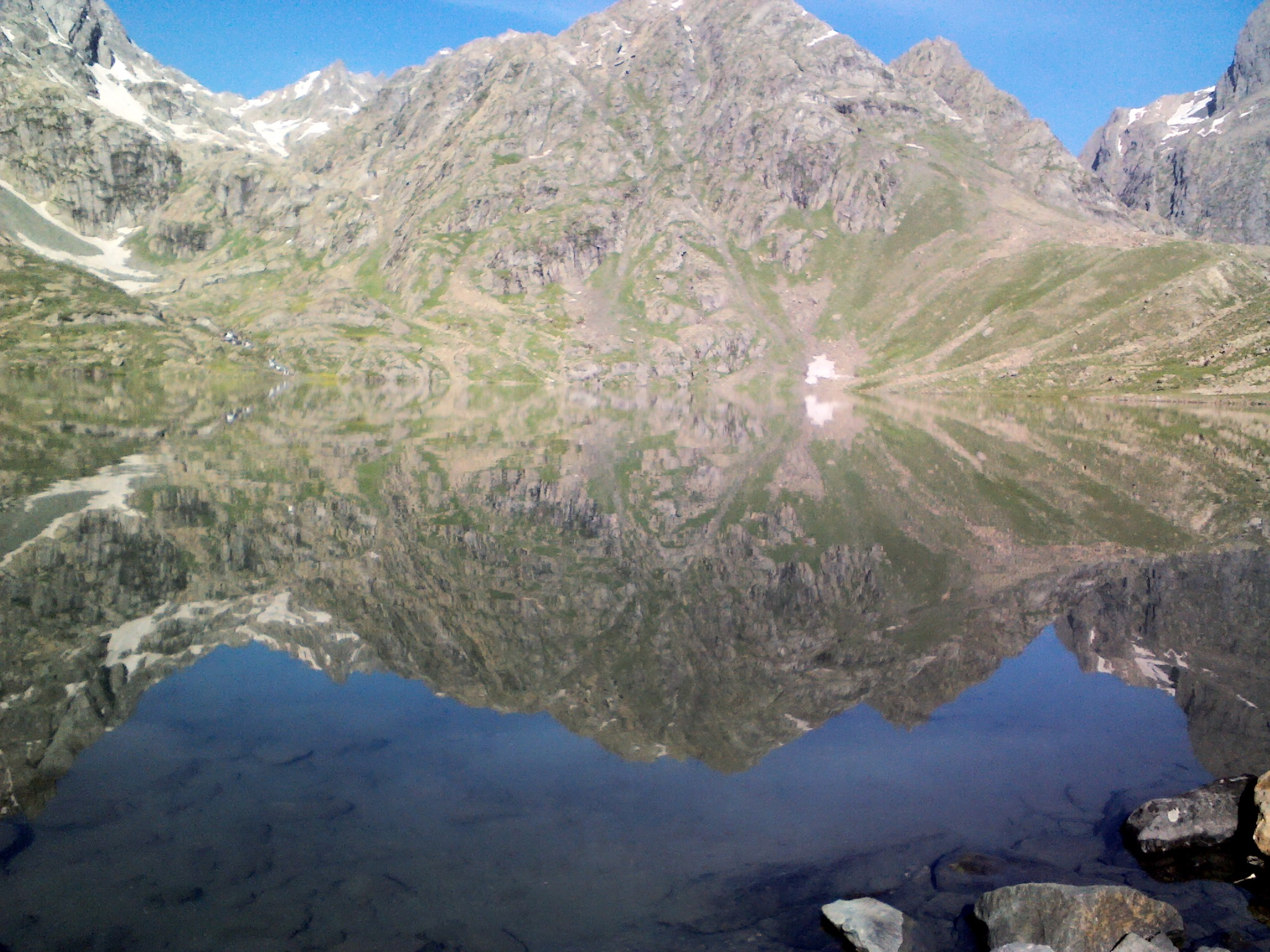

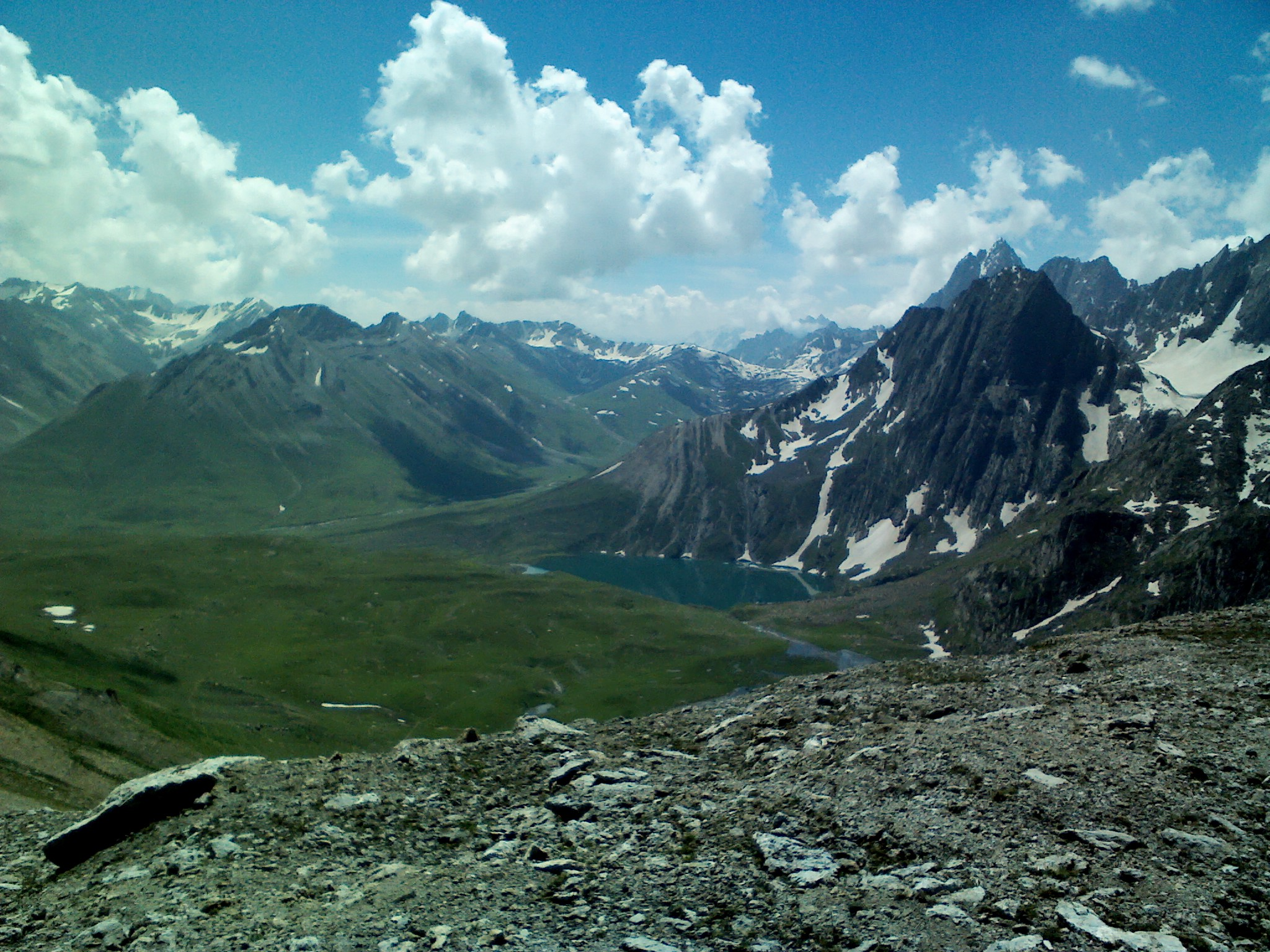

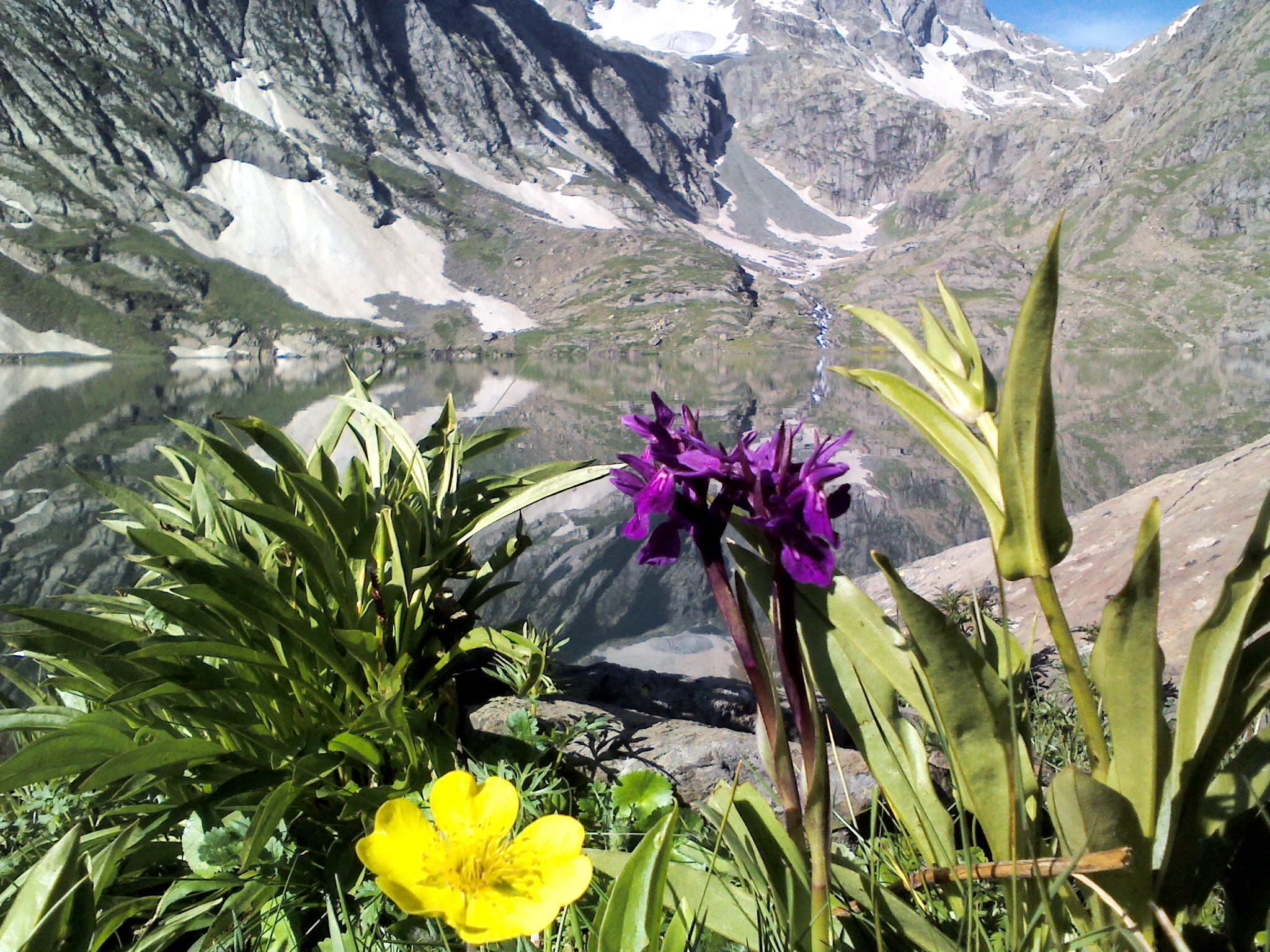

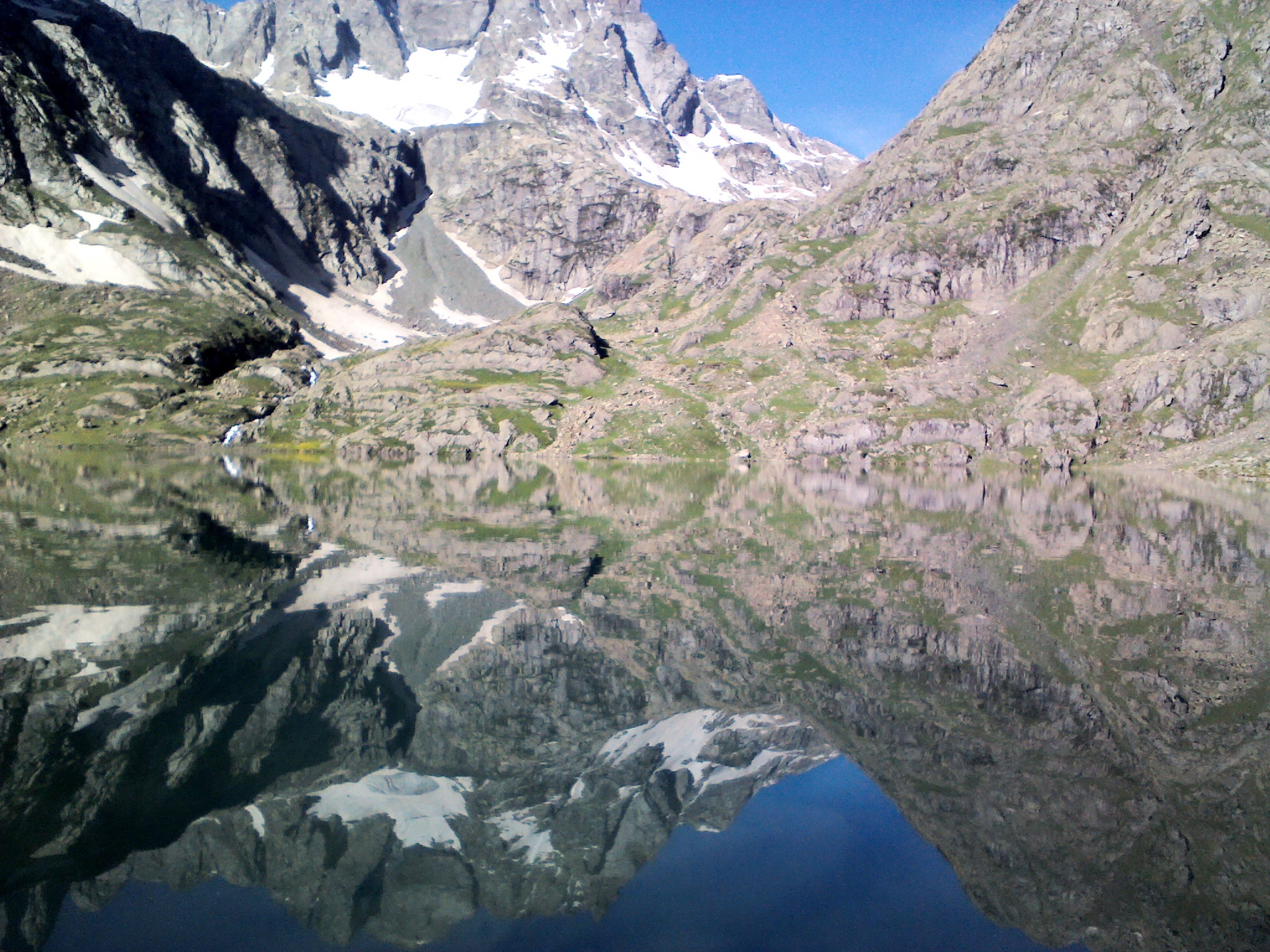
