= Sonamarg =

Hill station in Jammu and Kashmir, India

Sonamarg Sonamarag Sonmarg
- Hill station
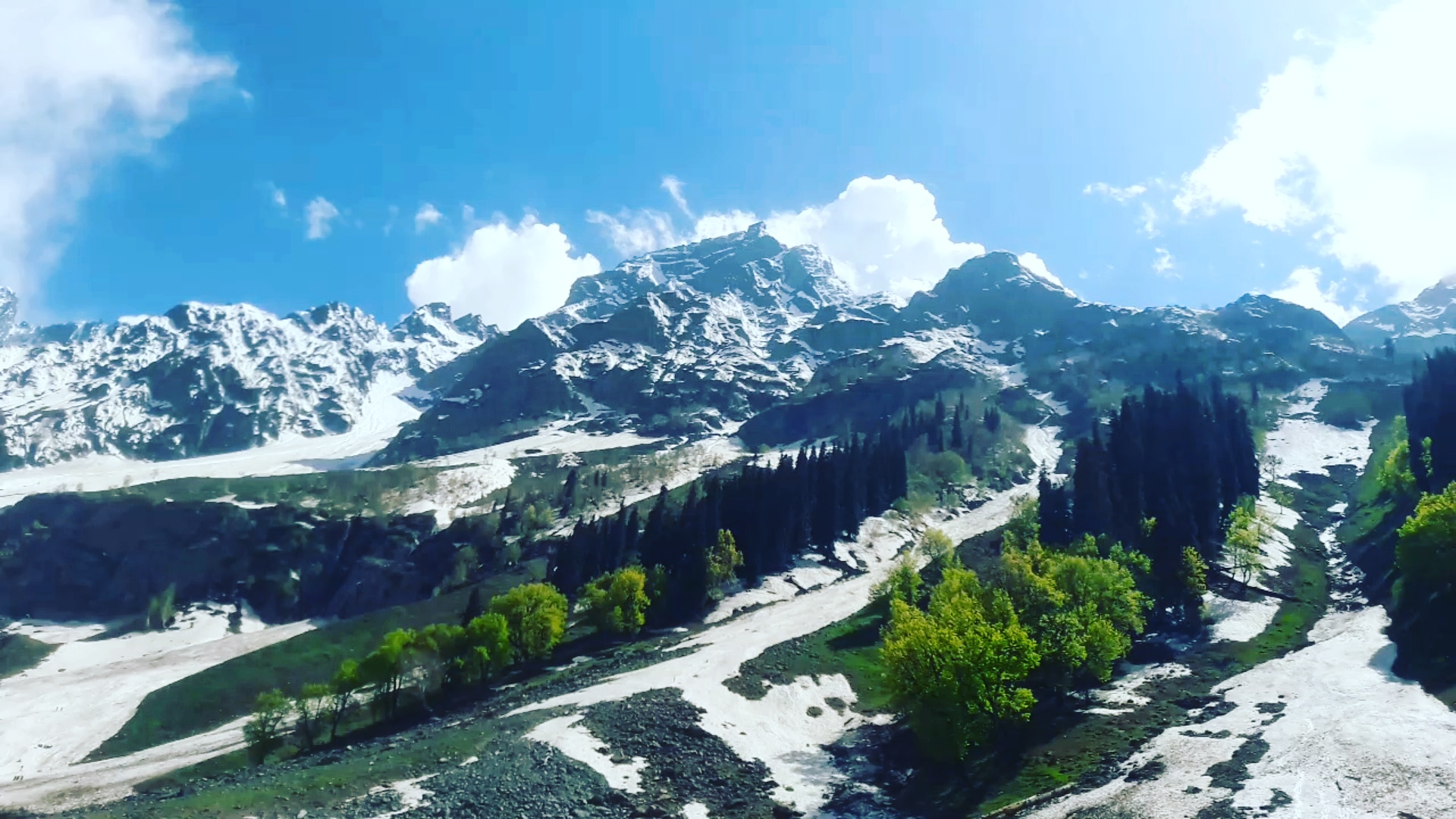
- Northern Sonamarg photographed in 2017

- Location within Jammu and Kashmir Location within India
- Coordinates: 34.30146°N 75.29252°E
- Country: India
- Union territory: Jammu and Kashmir
- District: Ganderbal
- Elevation: 2,730 m (8,960 ft)

Population
  - Total: 392

Languages
  - Official: Kashmiri, Urdu, Hindi, Dogri, English
  - Spoken: Pahari, Gujari, Shina, Balti, Phustu
- Time zone: UTC+5:30 (IST)
- PIN: 191202
- Telephone code: +91-1942417-
- Vehicle registration: JK16

Sonamarg or Sonmarg (Urdu pronunciation: [soːnɑːməɾɡ]), known as Sonamarag (Kashmiri pronunciation: [sɔnɨmarɨɡ]; lit. 'meadow of gold') in Kashmiri, is a hill station located in the Ganderbal District of Jammu and Kashmir, India in the disputed Kashmir region. It is located about 62 kilometers from Ganderbal Town and 80 kilometres (50 mi) northeast of the capital city, Srinagar.

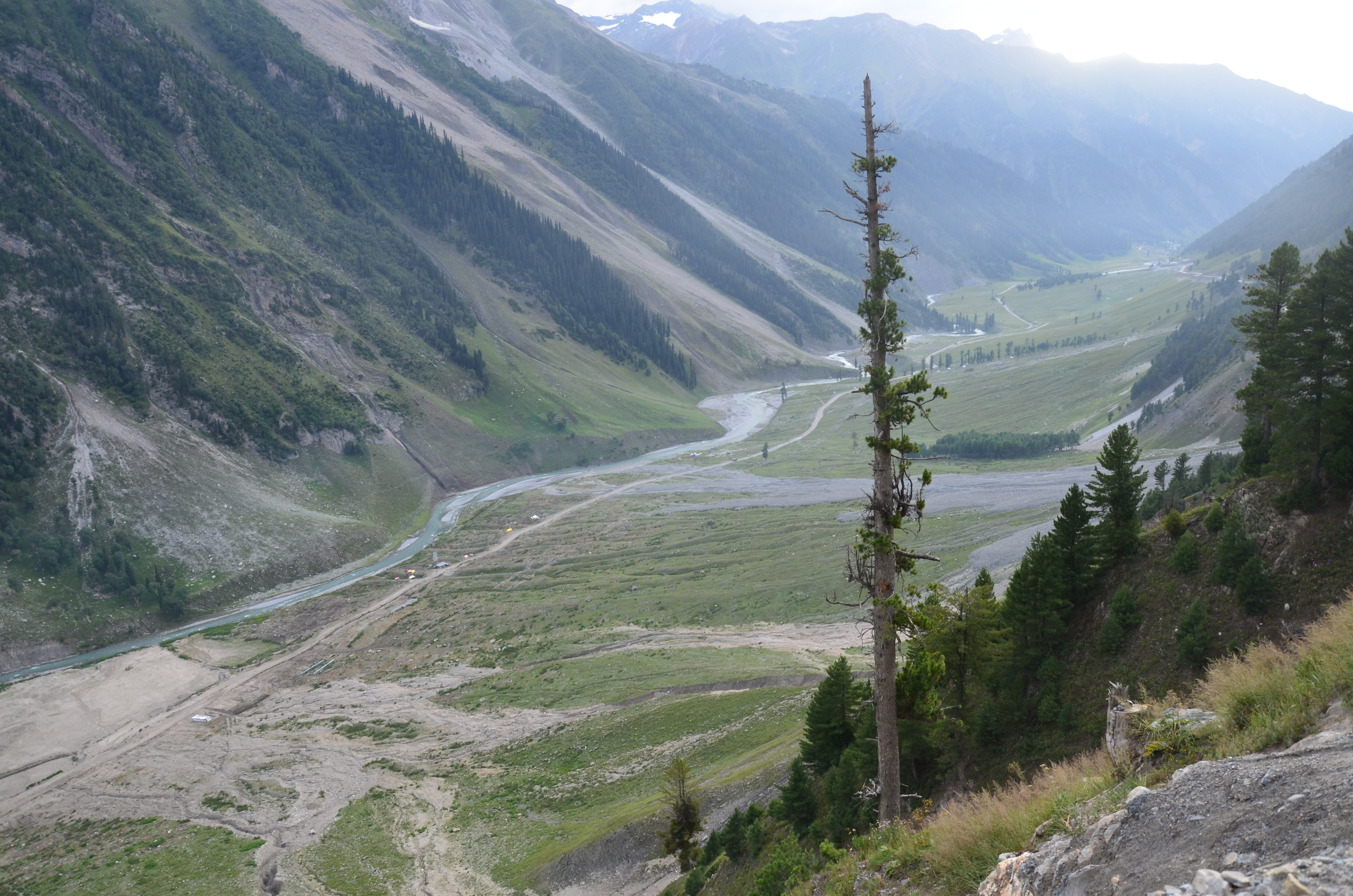
View of Sonamarg Valley

== History ==
Sonamarg had historical significance as a gateway on the ancient Silk Road, connecting Kashmir with Tibet. Today, the hill station is a popular tourist destination amongst fishers and hikers, and following the Kargil War with neighbouring Pakistan in 1999, it serves as a strategically important point for the Indian Army.

On 25 May 2024, a section of a glacier near Thajiwas Glacier collapsed, leading to two tourists falling into a snow cavity created by the break, killing one. On 2 June 2024, a section of Thajiwas Glacier collapsed, trapping three tourists who were rescued, and killing one laborer.

== Geography ==
The hill station is situated in the Kashmir Valley, at an altitude of 2,730 metres (8,960 ft) Combined with the alpine meadows that bloom in the summer as well as rivers and lakes stocked with fish, Sonamarg is a notable tourist destination in Jammu and Kashmir.

=== Climate ===
Given its high altitude 2,730m and mountainous terrain, Sonamarg experiences the regionally-rare humid continental climate (Köppen: Dfb) with significant rainfall. The average temperature in Sonamarg is 5.1 °C (41.2 °F), and nearly 932 mm (36.7 in) of precipitation falls annually (not counting the heavy snowfall that falls occasionally in winter).

Climate data for Sonmarg
Month	Jan	Feb	Mar	Apr	May	Jun	Jul	Aug	Sep	Oct	Nov	Dec	Year
Record high °C (°F)	8.4 (47.1)	11.0 (51.8)	21.8 (71.2)	23.6 (74.5)	28.8 (83.8)	31.1 (88.0)	33.1 (91.6)	32.8 (91.0)	31.0 (87.8)	26.3 (79.3)	18.5 (65.3)	10.7 (51.3)	33.1 (91.6)
Mean daily maximum °C (°F)	−7.4 (18.7)	−3.4 (25.9)	2.7 (36.9)	11.3 (52.3)	19.0 (66.2)	21.7 (71.1)	24.3 (75.7)	23.1 (73.6)	21.1 (70.0)	13.0 (55.4)	4.7 (40.5)	−2.5 (27.5)	10.6 (51.2)
Daily mean °C (°F)	−10.4 (13.3)	−7.9 (17.8)	−1.7 (28.9)	4.6 (40.3)	10.8 (51.4)	15.1 (59.2)	18.6 (65.5)	18.5 (65.3)	14.8 (58.6)	5.8 (42.4)	0.1 (32.2)	−7.1 (19.2)	5.1 (41.2)
Mean daily minimum °C (°F)	−13.4 (7.9)	−12.5 (9.5)	−6.1 (21.0)	−2.0 (28.4)	2.7 (36.9)	8.5 (47.3)	13.0 (55.4)	13.9 (57.0)	8.6 (47.5)	−1.3 (29.7)	−4.4 (24.1)	−11.8 (10.8)	−0.4 (31.3)
Average precipitation mm (inches)	95 (3.7)	98 (3.9)	137 (5.4)	139 (5.5)	115 (4.5)	50 (2.0)	54 (2.1)	68 (2.7)	68 (2.7)	42 (1.7)	26 (1.0)	40 (1.6)	932 (36.8)
Source: Climate Dat

== Demographics ==
Sonamarg has no permanent settlement and is inaccessible during winter due to heavy snowfall and avalanches. Per the 2011 Census of India, Sonamarg had a seasonal population of 392 (51% male, 49% female), excluding tourists and those working in the tourism industry.

== Tourism ==
Sonamarg provides glaciers like Kolahoi Peak & trekking routes leading to Vishansar Lake, Krishansar Lake, Gangabal Lake, and Gadsar Lake in the Himalayas, which are stocked with snowtrout and brown trout. The Sind River meanders here and abounds with trout and mahseer. Ponies can be hired for a trip up to Thajiwas glacier, in the summer. The Yatra to the nearby Amarnath Temple begins in Sonamarg.

Baltal, 15 km east of Sonamarg, is a valley that lies at the foot of the Zoji La pass. Trekkers can also reach the city of Leh—known as "the rooftop of the world"—by crossing over the Zoji La.

The Jammu and Kashmir tourism department organizes river rafting tournaments at Sonamarg throughout the year, which have recently seen the participation of teams from abroad.

== Access ==
Sonamarg is accessible by bus or car from Srinagar, the capital of Jammu and Kashmir, via National Highway 1 (NH 1) and the Zoji La pass. During the winter, heavy snowfall and avalanches block the NH 1, meaning local traffic is only permitted up to Gagangear village, which is the last permanent settlement of this area. But now, due to the construction of Z-Morh Tunnel, the road will remain open throughout the year.

== Gallery ==
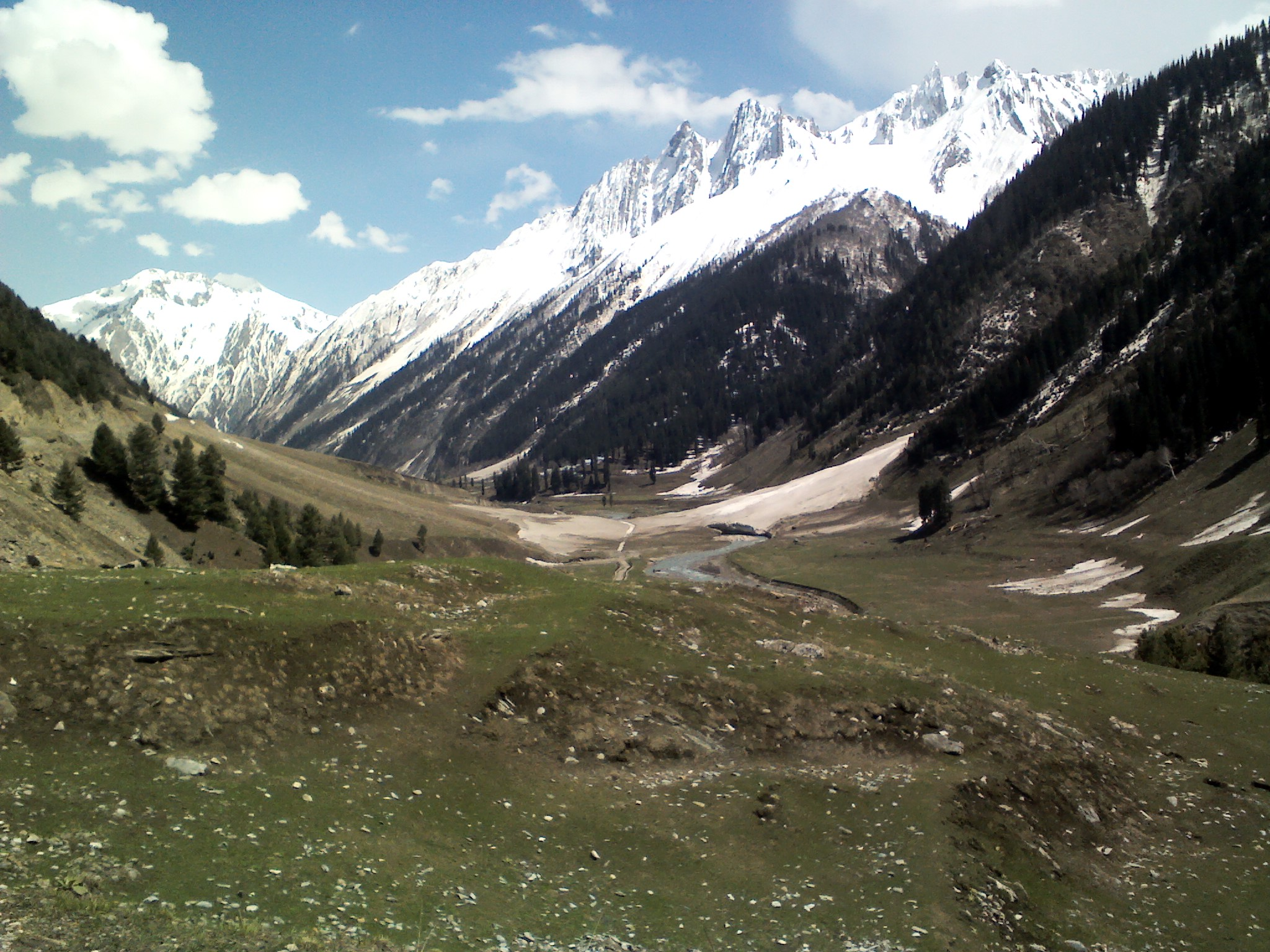
Sirbal Sonamarg

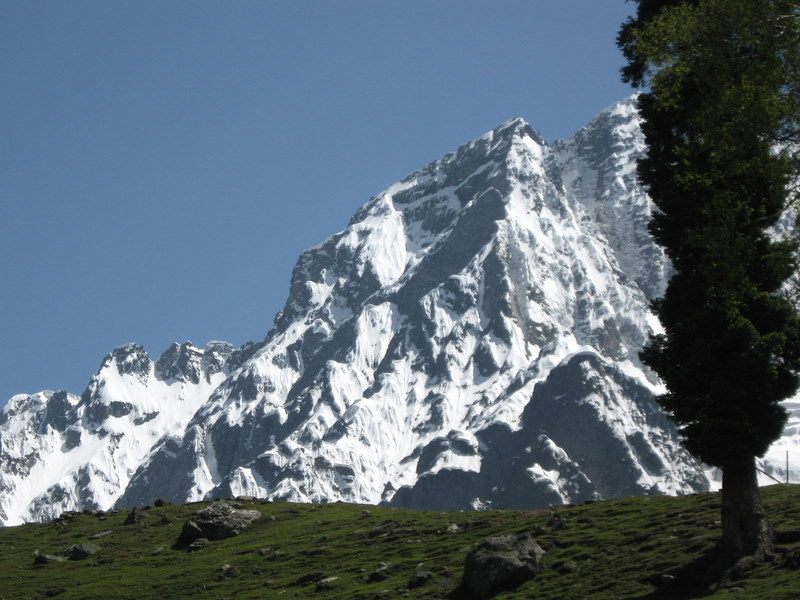
A view of the Himalayas from Sonmarg valley

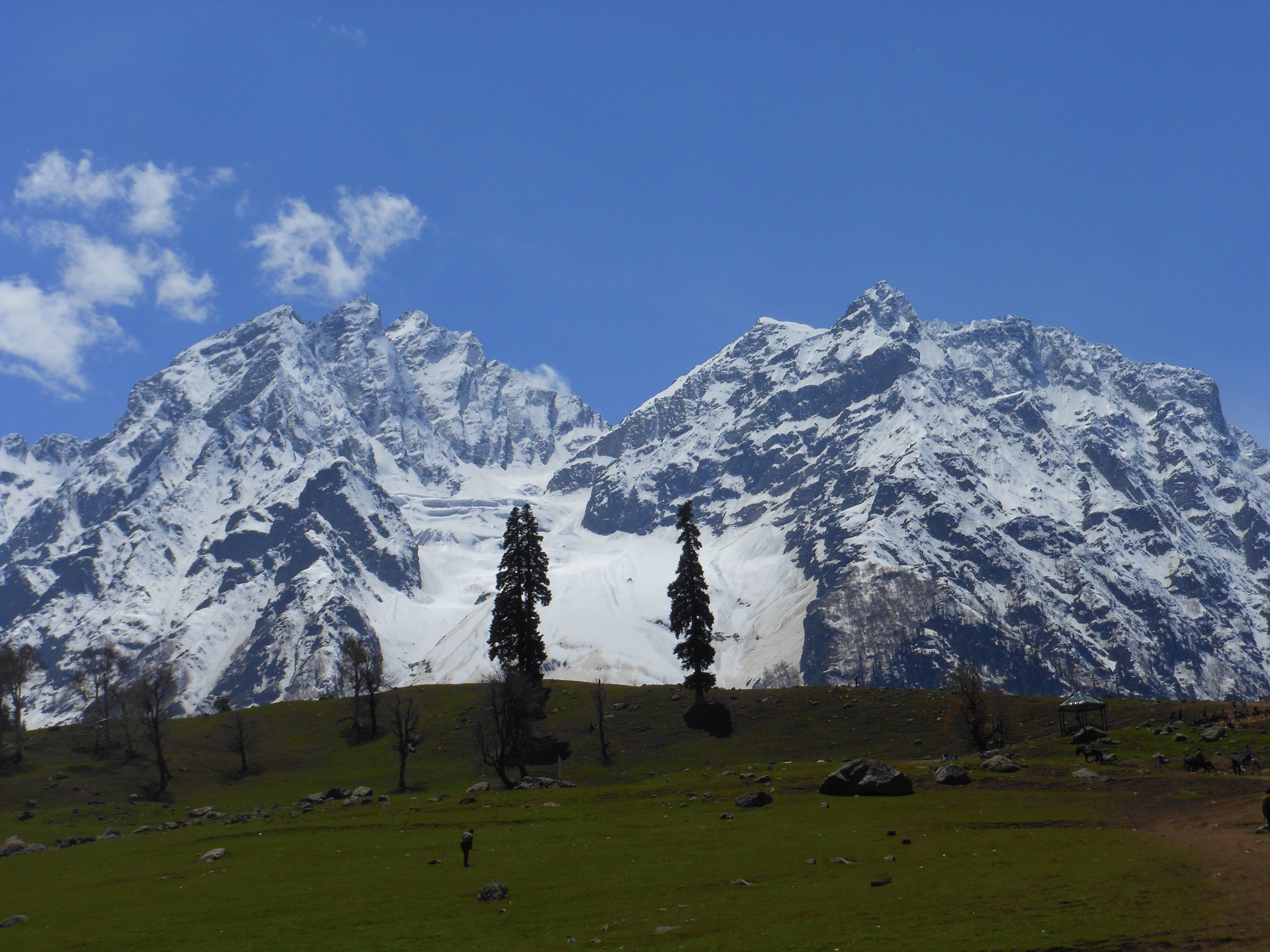
A view of the mountains from Sonmarg valley

Sonmarg Thajiwas glacier in May 2013

Parking at stage 1 of Thajiwas Glacier, 3 km from Sonmarg

== See also ==
- Dal Lake
- Pahalgam
- Aharbal
- Gangabal
- Kokernag
- Dachigam National Park
- Verinag
- Indira Gandhi Memorial Tulip Garden
- Kausar Nag
- Zabarwan Range
- Sheikh ul-Alam International Airport
- Meenamarg
- Mughal Road
- Kolahoi Peak
- Martand Sun Temple
- Amarnath Cave
- Kashmir Railway
- Kheer Bhawani
