= Baltal, Jammu and Kashmir =

Baltal Baltal Baltal
- Town
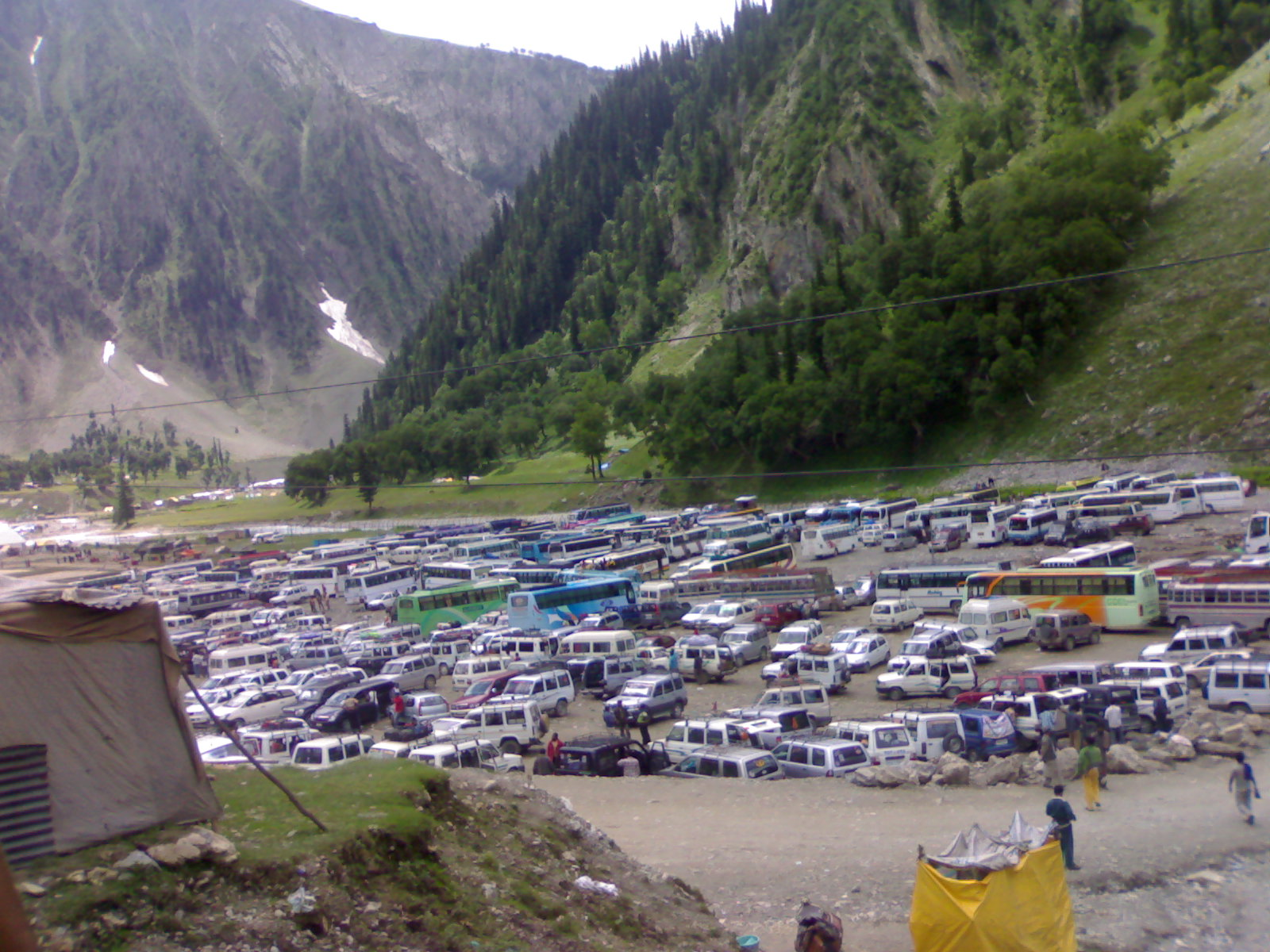
- Baltal view during Amarnath Yatra

- Location within Jammu and Kashmir Location within India
- Coordinates: 34.257°N 75.416°E
- Country: India
- Union territory: Jammu and Kashmir
- District: Ganderbal
- Elevation: 2,730 m (8,960 ft)

Population
  - Total: 392

Languages
  - Official: Kashmiri, Urdu, Hindi, Dogri, English
- Time zone: UTC+5:30 (IST)
- PIN: 191202
- Telephone code: +91-1942417-
- Vehicle registration: JK16

Baltal is a small Town for pilgrims, 75 km from Ganderbal town in Ganderbal district of Jammu and Kashmir, India and 93 km from capital city Srinagar and 15 km north of Sonamarg on the Sind River at the base of Zojila pass. This little valley is only a day's journey away from Srinagar and provides a shorter high-altitude alternate route to the sacred cave of Amarnath.

== Overview ==
Perched at an elevation of 2,743 m (8,999 ft), the highland pastures, Baltal serves as the base camp for pilgrims on their onward journey to Amarnath Caves, 14 km away. The site is seen with pitched tents meant for the pilgrims to spend the night. Baltal is one hour away from Sonmarg on a taxi or a bus. It can also be reached from Pahalgam, 24 km away, in about 1 day by foot. For hikers, it takes around one day to reach Baltal from Pahalgam.

Renowned for its scenic beauty, Baltal meadows offers tent accommodation for the pilgrims and tourists alike at reasonable prices. Both pony rides or, for those who can afford, helicopter services are available to the holy Amarnath Caves. Helicopter passengers have to disembark at Panjtarni and foot it, or take a pony ride, to the cave, 5 km away. For the hikers, the 14 km distance from Baltal to Amarnath takes about 8 hours on a winding steep trail. Basic teashops are available on route.
