= Meenamarg =

- Nickname: The Gateway to Ladakh
- Interactive map of Meenamarg
- Location in Ladakh, India Meenamarg (Jammu and Kashmir) Meenamarg (India)
- Coordinates: 34°16′44″N 75°28′19″E
- Country: India
- Union Territory: Ladakh
- District: Drass
- Tehsil: Dras
- Elevation: 3,300 m (10,800 ft)

Population
  - Total: 1,988

Languages
  - Official: Hindi, Balti, Shina
- Time zone: UTC+5:30 (IST)
- PIN: 194102
- Website: kargil.gov.in

Meenmarg is one the entry points in Ladakh from Jammu and Kashmir in India. It is just east of Zoji La Pass. Meenamarg lies on the National Highway 1 between Srinagar and Leh. A full-fledged COVID-19 screening post was established in Meenimarg in 2020.
