= Ministry of Road Transport and Highways =

Government ministry of India

- Branch of Government of India

Ministry overview
- Formed: July 1942; 84 years ago
- Jurisdiction: Government of India
- Headquarters: Transport Bhawan, 1, Parliament Street, New Delhi; 28°37′9.58″N 77°12′37.29″E
- Annual budget: ₹309,000 crore (US$32 billion) (2026-27 est.)
- Minister responsible: Nitin Gadkari, Cabinet Minister
- Deputy Ministers responsible: Ajay Tamta, Minister of State; Harsh Malhotra, Minister of State
- Ministry executive: V Umashankar, IAS, Secretary
- Child agencies: NHAI; NHIDCL
- Website: morth.nic.in

The Ministry of Road Transport and Highways (MoRTH) is a ministry of the Government of India, that is the apex body for formulation and administration of the rules, regulations and laws relating to road transport, transport research and in also to increase the mobility and efficiency of the road transport system in India. Through its officers of Central Engineering Services (Roads) cadre it is responsible for the development of National Highways of the country.

Road transport is a critical infrastructure for economic development of the country. It influences the pace, structure and pattern of development. In India, roads are used to transport over 60 percent of the total goods and 85 percent of the passenger traffic. Hence, development of this sector is of paramount importance for India and accounts for a significant part in the budget.

== History ==
=== Creation ===
The Department of War Transport was formed in July, 1942, by the bifurcation of the then Department of Communications into two Departments:

- Department of Posts
- Department of War Transport.
- Department of war READ MORE

The functions allocated to the Department of war Transport include Major Ports, Railways Priorities, utilization of road and water transport, Petrol rationing and Producer Gas. Broadly speaking, the functions of the War Transport Department were to coordinate the demands for transport in war time, Coastal Shipping and the administration and development of major ports. Later, the planning of export was undertaken as a corollary to the Departments control of transport priorities also.

=== Changes made over years ===
- 1957: Department of War Transport was renamed as Ministry of Transport & Communications and Department of transport was placed under it.
- 1966: On 25 January, under President's order the Department of Transport, Shipping & Tourism was placed under Ministry of Transport and Aviation.
- 1967: On 13 March, the Ministry of Transport and Aviation was bifurcated into Ministry of Shipping and Transport and the Ministry of Tourism and Civil Aviation.
- 1985: On 25 September, during reorganisation the Ministry of Transport and Shipping became the Department of Surface Transport under the Ministry of Transport.
- 1986: On 22 October, the Department of Surface Transport under Ministry of Transport was renamed as Ministry of Surface Transport .
- 1999: On 15 October, Ministry of Surface Transport was subsequently re-organized into departments, namely Department of Shipping and Department of Road Transport and Highways.
- 2000: On 17 November, the Ministry of Surface Transport was bifurcated into two Ministries namely Ministry of Road Transport and Highways and Ministry of Shipping.
- 2004: On 2 October, Ministry of Shipping and Ministry of Road Transport has again been merged and renamed as Ministry of Shipping and Road Transport and Highways
- 2009: The Ministry of Shipping was again formed by bifurcating the Ministry Of Shipping, Road Transport, and Highways

== Organisational structure ==
- The Ministry of Road Transport Highways is structurally divided into the following wings:

1. Road wing 2. Road Transport Wing 3. Transport Research Wing 4. Highways Wing 5. Finance Wing 6. Administration Wing 7. International Cooperation Wing 8. Toll & Coordination Wing 9. Land Acquisition Wing 10. Parliament Wing

Apart from these there is the Planning and Monitoring zone.

- The Secretary (Road Transport & Highways) is assisted by Director General (Road Development) & Special Secretary, Joint Secretary (Road Transport), Financial Advisor, Advisor (Transport Research).
- Director General (Road Development) is responsible for Development & Maintenance of National Highways.
- Joint Secretary looks after transport administration, public grievances, vigilance road safety and coordination & public relations
- Accounts Wing is headed by the Chief Controller of Accounts who is responsible for accounts budget, work and study.
- Advisor (Transport Research Wing) renders necessary data support to various wings of the Ministry for policy planning, transport coordination, economic and statistical analysis on various modes of transport with which the ministry is concerned.

=== Regional Offices ===
Following are the regional offices, each headed by a Regional Officer (RO):

City	State / Union Territory
Bengaluru	State of Karnataka
Chennai	State of Tamil Nadu
Mumbai	State of Maharashtra
Kolkata	State of West Bengal
Chandigarh	Union Territory of Chandigarh
Jaipur	State of Rajasthan
Patna	State of Bihar
Guwahati	State of Assam
Hyderabad	State of Telangana
Gandhinagar	State of Gujarat
Bhubaneswar	State of Odisha
Bhopal	State of Madhya Pradesh
Thiruvananthapuram	State of Kerala
Lucknow	State of Uttar Pradesh
Varanasi	State of Uttar Pradesh
Raipur	State of Chhattisgarh
Dehradun	State of Uttarakhand
Shimla	State of Himachal Pradesh
Surat	State of Gujarat

The ministry has following wings functioning under it:

=== Roads Wing ===
The road wing of the MoRTH is the backbone of the country's road network development programme. It is staffed by officers of the Central Engineering Services (Roads). It is headed by Director General (Road Development) and Special Secretary to the Government of India.

The Road wing of MoRTH is further divided into five Project Zones. Each Project zone is generally vested with responsibility of four to five states for National highway development and development of road network. These five project Zones are headed by five Additional Director Generals (ADG) of Central Engineering Services (Roads) cadre who are assisted by Zonal Chief Engineer of Headquarter and Regional Officers. Regional officers are posted on ground in their respective states for development and maintenance of National Highways through State PWDs.

Main responsibilities of the roads wing are:

- Planning, development and maintenance of National Highways
- Extends technical and financial support to the state government for development of state roads and roads of inter-state connectivity and national importance.
- Setting standards for building and maintenance of roads and bridges.
- Archiving important technical knowledge generated through projects and R&D.
- Sanctioning of works related to construction, maintenance and operation of National Highways.
- Sanctioning the estimates for various centrally sponsored schemes including CRF (Central Road Fund), Roads of Interstate Connectivity.
- Dealing the matters related to road safety.
- Administration of NH act 1956, The Highway Administration Rules 2005

=== Transport Wing ===
Main responsibilities of the transport wing are:

- Motor Vehicle Legislation
- Taxation of motor vehicles
- Compulsory insurance for vehicles
- Promotion of Transport cooperatives in the field of motor transport.
- Setting National road safety standards
- Compiling data on road accidents and evolving a road safety culture among the people in the country
- Providing grants to NGOs in accordance with laid down guidelines.

=== Planning and Monitoring Zone ===
This zones are headed by two separate Chief Engineers of Central Engineering Services (Roads). Main responsibilities of this zone are:

- Preparation of budgets and scheme wise allocation of funds maintaining records of expenditure.
- Identification of stretches that may form probable network of National Highways.
- Notification and de-notification of National Highways.
- The Monitoring Zone deals with the monitoring and reviewing progress of ongoing NH works dealt by various executing Agencies of NH development.

=== Standards and Research (S&R) Zone ===
This zones is headed by a Chief Engineers of Central Engineering Services (Roads). Main responsibilities of this zone is Preparation of standards/ rules / guidelines for NH development program and related activities.

== Agencies ==
=== Autonomous bodies ===
Following are the autonomous agencies under the MoRTH.

- National Highways Authority of India (NHAI), Sector-10, Dwarka, Delhi
- Association of State Road Transport Undertakings, New Delhi

=== Public Sector Undertakings ===
- National Highways and Infrastructure Development Corporation Limited (NHIDCL), New Delhi
- National Highways Logistics Management Limited, a 100% owned company of NHAI
- Indian Highways Management Company Limited

=== Academy ===
- Central Institute of Road Transport (CIRT), Pune
- Indian Academy of Highway Engineers (IAHE), Sector 62, Noida

== Acts ==
Over years the ministry has passed several acts to maintain law and order in Road Transport in the country

- Road Transport Corporations Act, 1950
- National Highways Act, 1956
- Motor Vehicles Act, 1988
- National Highways Authority of India Act, 1988

== Statistics ==
India has one of the largest road networks of over 4.885 million km consisting of :

Road Length Distribution
Roads	Length
National Highways/Expressways	1,32,500 km
State Highways	1,56,694 km
Other Roads	56,08,477 km
Total	58,97,671 km

The total road length of India had grown more than 11 times in 60 years from 1951 to 2011; also the length of the surfaced roads had increased about 16 times over the same period. The connectivity in India has tremendously improved due to formation of new surface roads.

- Total length of roads (in lakh km)
- Total length of surfaced roads (in lakh km)

For development of roads in the country the government has made an allocation of ₹19,423.88 crores under the Central Road Fund for 2013–2014 with the following breakup:

Type	Grants
Grants to State Governments and UTs for State Roads	₹2,659.91 crores
Grants to SGs and UTs for inte-state connectivity and roads of national importance	₹262.22 crores
National Highways	₹9,881.95 crores
Rural Roads	₹5,827.20 crores
Railways	₹1092.60 crores
Total	₹19,423.88 crores

== Government initiatives ==
The government has provided various incentives for private and foreign investments in the roads sector. 100% FDI is allowed in the sectors of land transport to promote building of highway bridges, toll roads, and vehicular tunnels; services incidental to transport such as cargo handling is incidental to land transport; construction and maintenance of roads, bridges; and construction and maintenance of roads and highways offered on build-operate-transfer (BOT) basis, including collection of toll.

A 10-year tax exemption under Section 80 IA has been granted to the highway building projects to attract private investors. The ministry has also framed a ‘Special Accelerated Road Development Programme in North Eastern Region' for improving road connectivity to remote places in this region. The estimated cost of the proposal is US$2.53 billion. The Union Budget 2012–13 proposed an increase of allocation of the Ministry of Road Transport and Highways by 14% to ₹25,360 crore (US$2.6 billion).

The World Bank has approved a US$975 million loan for developing the first phase of the eastern arm of the US$17.21 billion Dedicated Freight Corridor Project in India. The Dedicated Freight Corridor Corporation of India Ltd. has tied up with the Japanese Bank of Industrial Cooperation for US$14.56 billion funding as loan for the first phase and it is likely to be commissioned in 2016.

The Prime Minister Gram Sadak Yojana (PMGSY) is a scheme for development of rural roads in India. The Construction of Rural Roads Project (CRRP) is another initiative focused on rural development.

=== National Green Highways Program ===
Ministry of Transport and NHAI has launched the green highways programme in 2016.

== See also ==
- Minister of Road Transport and Highways
- National Highways Authority of India
- National Highways and Infrastructure Development Corporation Limited
- FASTag
- Ministry of Surface Transport (India)
- Ministry of Ports, Shipping and Waterways
- Ministry of Railways (India)
