= Untkheda =

Untkheda Oontkheda
- village
- Location within Madhya Pradesh Location within India
- Coordinates: 23.5123671°N 77.43704796°E
- Country: India
- State: Madhya Pradesh
- District: Bhopal
- Tehsil: Berasia
- Elevation: 468 m (1,535 ft)

Population (2011)
  - Total: 1,172
- Time zone: UTC+5:30 (IST)
- ISO 3166 code: MP-IN
- 2011 census code: 482312

Untkheda is a village in the Bhopal district of Madhya Pradesh, India. It is located in the Berasia tehsil.

== Demographics ==
According to the 2011 census of India, Untkheda has 215 households. The effective literacy rate (i.e. the literacy rate of population excluding children aged 6 and below) is 63.85%.

Demographics (2011 Census)
	Total	Male	Female
Population	1172	613	559
Children aged below 6 years	201	119	82
Scheduled caste	344	177	167
Scheduled tribe	35	20	15
Literates	620	356	264
Workers (all)	567	316	251
Main workers (total)	411	263	148
Main workers: Cultivators	175	104	71
Main workers: Agricultural labourers	218	147	71
Main workers: Household industry workers	2	2	0
Main workers: Other	16	10	6
Marginal workers (total)	156	53	103
Marginal workers: Cultivators	20	5	15
Marginal workers: Agricultural labourers	134	47	87
Marginal workers: Household industry workers	0	0	0
Marginal workers: Others	2	1	1
Non-workers	605	297	308
