= Khata Khedi =

- village
- Location within Madhya Pradesh Location within India
- Coordinates: 23.872299°N 77.290197°E
- Country: India
- State: Madhya Pradesh
- District: Bhopal
- Tehsil: Berasia

Population (2011)
  - Total: 839
- Time zone: UTC+5:30 (IST)
- ISO 3166 code: MP-IN
- Census code: 482047

Khata Khedi is a village in the Bhopal district of Madhya Pradesh, India. It is located in the Berasia tehsil.

== Demographics ==
According to the 2011 census of India, Khata Khedi has 117 households. The effective literacy rate (i.e. the literacy rate of population excluding children aged 6 and below) is 63.93%.

Demographics (2011 Census)
	Total	Male	Female
Population	839	432	407
Children aged below 6 years	132	73	59
Scheduled caste	221	114	107
Scheduled tribe	72	30	42
Literates	452	265	187
Workers (all)	361	209	152
Main workers (total)	357	208	149
Main workers: Cultivators	211	126	85
Main workers: Agricultural labourers	114	67	47
Main workers: Household industry workers	15	5	10
Main workers: Other	17	10	7
Marginal workers (total)	4	1	3
Marginal workers: Cultivators	1	1	0
Marginal workers: Agricultural labourers	2	0	2
Marginal workers: Household industry workers	0	0	0
Marginal workers: Others	1	0	1
Non-workers	478	223	255
