= Kutkipura =

- village
- Location within Madhya Pradesh Location within India
- Coordinates: 23.435867°N 77.3180836°E
- Country: India
- State: Madhya Pradesh
- District: Bhopal
- Tehsil: Berasia
- Elevation: 518 m (1,699 ft)

Population (2011)
  - Total: 914
- Time zone: UTC+5:30 (IST)
- ISO 3166 code: MP-IN
- 2011 census code: 482293

Kutkipura is a village in the Bhopal district of Madhya Pradesh, India. It is located in the Berasia tehsil.

== Demographics ==
According to the 2011 census of India, Kutkipura has 197 households. The effective literacy rate (i.e. the literacy rate of population excluding children aged 6 and below) is 76.8%.

Demographics (2011 Census)
| | Total | Male | Female |
|---|---|---|---|
| Population | 914 | 474 | 440 |
| Children aged below 6 years | 138 | 73 | 65 |
| Scheduled caste | 286 | 152 | 134 |
| Scheduled tribe | 0 | 0 | 0 |
| Literates | 596 | 345 | 251 |
| Workers (all) | 380 | 229 | 151 |
| Main workers (total) | 320 | 200 | 120 |
| Main workers: Cultivators | 59 | 37 | 22 |
| Main workers: Agricultural labourers | 212 | 125 | 87 |
| Main workers: Household industry workers | 10 | 8 | 2 |
| Main workers: Other | 39 | 30 | 9 |
| Marginal workers (total) | 60 | 29 | 31 |
| Marginal workers: Cultivators | 3 | 1 | 2 |
| Marginal workers: Agricultural labourers | 37 | 16 | 21 |
| Marginal workers: Household industry workers | 4 | 2 | 2 |
| Marginal workers: Others | 16 | 10 | 6 |
| Non-workers | 534 | 245 | 289 |
