= Dohaya =

- village
- Location within Madhya Pradesh Location within India
- Coordinates: 23.746354°N 77.529929°E
- Country: India
- State: Madhya Pradesh
- District: Bhopal
- Tehsil: Berasia

Population (2011)
  - Total: 841
- Time zone: UTC+5:30 (IST)
- ISO 3166 code: MP-IN
- Census code: 482160

Dohaya is a village in the Bhopal district of Madhya Pradesh, India. It is located in the Berasia tehsil.

== Demographics ==
According to the 2011 census of India, Dohaya has 162 households. The effective literacy rate (i.e. the literacy rate of population excluding children aged 6 and below) is 68.12%.

Demographics (2011 Census)
	Total	Male	Female
Population	841	455	386
Children aged below 6 years	132	72	60
Scheduled caste	276	145	131
Scheduled tribe	0	0	0
Literates	483	305	178
Workers (all)	476	251	225
Main workers (total)	175	168	7
Main workers: Cultivators	94	94	0
Main workers: Agricultural labourers	75	71	4
Main workers: Household industry workers	0	0	0
Main workers: Other	6	3	3
Marginal workers (total)	301	83	218
Marginal workers: Cultivators	15	10	5
Marginal workers: Agricultural labourers	284	73	211
Marginal workers: Household industry workers	0	0	0
Marginal workers: Others	2	0	2
Non-workers	365	204	161
