= Suhaya =

- village
- Location within Madhya Pradesh Location within India
- Coordinates: 23.733414°N 77.514432°E
- Country: India
- State: Madhya Pradesh
- District: Bhopal
- Tehsil: Berasia

Population (2011)
  - Total: 3,024
- Time zone: UTC+5:30 (IST)
- ISO 3166 code: MP-IN
- Census code: 482161

Suhaya is a village in the Bhopal district of Madhya Pradesh, India. It is located in the Berasia tehsil.

== Demographics ==
According to the 2011 census of India, Suhaya has 584 households. The effective literacy rate (i.e. the literacy rate of population excluding children aged 6 and below) is 67.66%.

Demographics (2011 Census)
	Total	Male	Female
Population	3024	1588	1436
Children aged below 6 years	547	293	254
Scheduled caste	487	248	239
Scheduled tribe	3	3	0
Literates	1676	1060	616
Workers (all)	1303	819	484
Main workers (total)	592	538	54
Main workers: Cultivators	292	284	8
Main workers: Agricultural labourers	177	141	36
Main workers: Household industry workers	9	9	0
Main workers: Other	114	104	10
Marginal workers (total)	711	281	430
Marginal workers: Cultivators	83	28	55
Marginal workers: Agricultural labourers	602	235	367
Marginal workers: Household industry workers	9	6	3
Marginal workers: Others	17	12	5
Non-workers	1721	769	952
