= Barri Mustsil Bagraj =

- village
- Location within Madhya Pradesh Location within India
- Coordinates: 23.5016429°N 77.4788014°E
- Country: India
- State: Madhya Pradesh
- District: Bhopal
- Tehsil: Berasia
- Elevation: 462 m (1,516 ft)

Population (2011)
  - Total: 791
- Time zone: UTC+5:30 (IST)
- ISO 3166 code: MP-IN
- 2011 census code: 482316

Barri Mustsil Bagraj is a village in the Bhopal district of Madhya Pradesh, India. It is located in the Berasia tehsil.

== Demographics ==
According to the 2011 census of India, Barri Mustsil Bagraj has 159 households. The effective literacy rate (i.e. the literacy rate of population excluding children aged 6 and below) is 61.69%.

Demographics (2011 Census)
	Total	Male	Female
Population	791	410	381
Children aged below 6 years	162	95	67
Scheduled caste	198	102	96
Scheduled tribe	0	0	0
Literates	388	218	170
Workers (all)	271	193	78
Main workers (total)	74	66	8
Main workers: Cultivators	57	55	2
Main workers: Agricultural labourers	14	8	6
Main workers: Household industry workers	1	1	0
Main workers: Other	2	2	0
Marginal workers (total)	197	127	70
Marginal workers: Cultivators	2	2	0
Marginal workers: Agricultural labourers	189	122	67
Marginal workers: Household industry workers	0	0	0
Marginal workers: Others	6	3	3
Non-workers	520	217	303
