= Arrai Rai Singh =

- village
- Location within Madhya Pradesh Location within India
- Coordinates: 23.688316°N 77.524435°E
- Country: India
- State: Madhya Pradesh
- District: Bhopal
- Tehsil: Berasia

Population (2011)
  - Total: 328
- Time zone: UTC+5:30 (IST)
- ISO 3166 code: MP-IN
- Census code: 482184

Arrai Rai Singh is a village in the Bhopal district of Madhya Pradesh, India. It is located in the Berasia tehsil.

== Demographics ==
According to the 2011 census of India, Arrai Rai Singh has 74 households. The effective literacy rate (i.e. the literacy rate of population excluding children aged 6 and below) is 56.04%.

Demographics (2011 Census)
	Total	Male	Female
Population	328	180	148
Children aged below 6 years	55	28	27
Scheduled caste	210	119	91
Scheduled tribe	0	0	0
Literates	153	99	54
Workers (all)	118	78	40
Main workers (total)	117	77	40
Main workers: Cultivators	25	23	2
Main workers: Agricultural labourers	89	51	38
Main workers: Household industry workers	0	0	0
Main workers: Other	3	3	0
Marginal workers (total)	1	1	0
Marginal workers: Cultivators	0	0	0
Marginal workers: Agricultural labourers	0	0	0
Marginal workers: Household industry workers	0	0	0
Marginal workers: Others	1	1	0
Non-workers	210	102	108
