= Bijawan Khurd =

- village
- Location within Madhya Pradesh Location within India
- Coordinates: 23.685783°N 77.226667°E
- Country: India
- State: Madhya Pradesh
- District: Bhopal
- Tehsil: Berasia

Population (2011)
  - Total: 184
- Time zone: UTC+5:30 (IST)
- ISO 3166 code: MP-IN
- Census code: 482092

Bijawan Khurd is a village in the Bhopal district of Madhya Pradesh, India. It is located in the Berasia tehsil.

== Demographics ==
According to the 2011 census of India, Bijawan Khurd has 38 households. The effective literacy rate (i.e. the literacy rate of population excluding children aged 6 and below) is 58.39%.

Demographics (2011 Census)
	Total	Male	Female
Population	184	104	80
Children aged below 6 years	23	13	10
Scheduled caste	0	0	0
Scheduled tribe	0	0	0
Literates	94	62	32
Workers (all)	91	50	41
Main workers (total)	47	45	2
Main workers: Cultivators	42	41	1
Main workers: Agricultural labourers	5	4	1
Main workers: Household industry workers	0	0	0
Main workers: Other	0	0	0
Marginal workers (total)	44	5	39
Marginal workers: Cultivators	11	1	10
Marginal workers: Agricultural labourers	29	3	26
Marginal workers: Household industry workers	0	0	0
Marginal workers: Others	4	1	3
Non-workers	93	54	39
