= Chakkheda =

- village
- Location within Madhya Pradesh Location within India
- Coordinates: 23.5741642°N 77.3640257°E
- Country: India
- State: Madhya Pradesh
- District: Bhopal
- Tehsil: Berasia
- Elevation: 483 m (1,585 ft)

Population (2011)
  - Total: 144
- Time zone: UTC+5:30 (IST)
- ISO 3166 code: MP-IN
- 2011 census code: 482248

Chakkheda is a village in the Bhopal district of Madhya Pradesh, India. It is located in the Berasia tehsil.

== Demographics ==
According to the 2011 census of India, Chakkheda has 31 households. The effective literacy rate (i.e. the literacy rate of population excluding children aged 6 and below) is 84.62%.

Demographics (2011 Census)
	Total	Male	Female
Population	144	79	65
Children aged below 6 years	27	14	13
Scheduled caste	3	2	1
Scheduled tribe	0	0	0
Literates	99	60	39
Workers (all)	85	44	41
Main workers (total)	62	40	22
Main workers: Cultivators	9	6	3
Main workers: Agricultural labourers	52	33	19
Main workers: Household industry workers	0	0	0
Main workers: Other	1	1	0
Marginal workers (total)	23	4	19
Marginal workers: Cultivators	0	0	0
Marginal workers: Agricultural labourers	22	4	18
Marginal workers: Household industry workers	0	0	0
Marginal workers: Others	1	0	1
Non-workers	59	35	24
