= Barkheda Baramad =

- village
- Location within Madhya Pradesh Location within India
- Coordinates: 23.5254874°N 77.3410569°E
- Country: India
- State: Madhya Pradesh
- District: Bhopal
- Tehsil: Berasia
- Elevation: 498 m (1,634 ft)

Population (2011)
  - Total: 160
- Time zone: UTC+5:30 (IST)
- ISO 3166 code: IN-MP
- 2011 census code: 482285

Barkheda Baramad is a village in the Bhopal district of Madhya Pradesh, India. It is located in the Berasia tehsil.

== Demographics ==
According to the 2011 census of India, Barkheda Baramad has 32 households. The effective literacy rate (i.e. the literacy rate of population excluding children aged 6 and below) is 72.06%.

Demographics (2011 Census)
| | Total | Male | Female |
|---|---|---|---|
| Population | 160 | 81 | 79 |
| Children aged below 6 years | 24 | 11 | 13 |
| Scheduled caste | 59 | 32 | 27 |
| Scheduled tribe | 0 | 0 | 0 |
| Literates | 98 | 59 | 39 |
| Workers (all) | 74 | 41 | 33 |
| Main workers (total) | 39 | 35 | 4 |
| Main workers: Cultivators | 19 | 17 | 2 |
| Main workers: Agricultural labourers | 16 | 14 | 2 |
| Main workers: Household industry workers | 0 | 0 | 0 |
| Main workers: Other | 4 | 4 | 0 |
| Marginal workers (total) | 35 | 6 | 29 |
| Marginal workers: Cultivators | 1 | 0 | 1 |
| Marginal workers: Agricultural labourers | 34 | 6 | 28 |
| Marginal workers: Household industry workers | 0 | 0 | 0 |
| Marginal workers: Others | 0 | 0 | 0 |
| Non-workers | 86 | 40 | 46 |
