= Bagsi =

- village
- Location within Madhya Pradesh Location within India
- Coordinates: 23.671618°N 77.224676°E
- Country: India
- State: Madhya Pradesh
- District: Bhopal
- Tehsil: Berasia

Population (2011)
  - Total: 1,515
- Time zone: UTC+5:30 (IST)
- ISO 3166 code: MP-IN
- Census code: 482095

Bagsi is a village in the Bhopal district of Madhya Pradesh, India. It is located in the Berasia tehsil.

== Demographics ==
According to the 2011 census of India, Bagsi has 315 households. The effective literacy rate (i.e. the literacy rate of population excluding children aged 6 and below) is 57.08%.

Demographics (2011 Census)
	Total	Male	Female
Population	1515	804	711
Children aged below 6 years	287	162	125
Scheduled caste	451	238	213
Scheduled tribe	26	14	12
Literates	701	446	255
Workers (all)	726	382	344
Main workers (total)	403	284	119
Main workers: Cultivators	133	102	31
Main workers: Agricultural labourers	248	165	83
Main workers: Household industry workers	12	12	0
Main workers: Other	10	5	5
Marginal workers (total)	323	98	225
Marginal workers: Cultivators	70	22	48
Marginal workers: Agricultural labourers	243	70	173
Marginal workers: Household industry workers	1	0	1
Marginal workers: Others	9	6	3
Non-workers	789	422	367
