= Dungariya =

- village
- Location within Madhya Pradesh Location within India
- Coordinates: 23.677815°N 77.527524°E
- Country: India
- State: Madhya Pradesh
- District: Bhopal
- Tehsil: Berasia

Population (2011)
  - Total: 2,236
- Time zone: UTC+5:30 (IST)
- ISO 3166 code: MP-IN
- Census code: 482191

Dungariya is a village in the Bhopal district of Madhya Pradesh, India. It is located in the Berasia tehsil. The Dungariya dam is located in this village.

== Demographics ==
According to the 2011 census of India, Dungariya has 491 households. The effective literacy rate (i.e. the literacy rate of population excluding children aged 6 and below) is 71.44%.

Demographics (2011 Census)
	Total	Male	Female
Population	2236	1170	1066
Children aged below 6 years	314	159	155
Scheduled caste	479	256	223
Scheduled tribe	2	1	1
Literates	1373	841	532
Workers (all)	1024	624	400
Main workers (total)	999	612	387
Main workers: Cultivators	443	285	158
Main workers: Agricultural labourers	499	279	220
Main workers: Household industry workers	1	1	0
Main workers: Other	56	47	9
Marginal workers (total)	25	12	13
Marginal workers: Cultivators	3	1	2
Marginal workers: Agricultural labourers	14	5	9
Marginal workers: Household industry workers	5	3	2
Marginal workers: Others	3	3	0
Non-workers	1212	546	666
