= Namdarpura =

- village
- Location within Madhya Pradesh Location within India
- Coordinates: 23.4538858°N 77.3238274°E
- Country: India
- State: Madhya Pradesh
- District: Bhopal
- Tehsil: Berasia
- Elevation: 513 m (1,683 ft)

Population (2011)
  - Total: 330
- Time zone: UTC+5:30 (IST)
- ISO 3166 code: MP-IN
- 2011 census code: 482292

Namdarpura is a village in the Bhopal district of Madhya Pradesh, India. It is located in the Berasia tehsil.

== Demographics ==
According to the 2011 census of India, Namdarpura has 65 households. The effective literacy rate (i.e. the literacy rate of population excluding children aged 6 and below) is 73.09%.

Demographics (2011 Census)
	Total	Male	Female
Population	330	169	161
Children aged below 6 years	55	30	25
Scheduled caste	6	3	3
Scheduled tribe	0	0	0
Literates	201	118	83
Workers (all)	140	89	51
Main workers (total)	140	89	51
Main workers: Cultivators	42	37	5
Main workers: Agricultural labourers	97	52	45
Main workers: Household industry workers	0	0	0
Main workers: Other	1	0	1
Marginal workers (total)	0	0	0
Marginal workers: Cultivators	0	0	0
Marginal workers: Agricultural labourers	0	0	0
Marginal workers: Household industry workers	0	0	0
Marginal workers: Others	0	0	0
Non-workers	190	80	110
