= Jhikariya Khurd =

- village
- Location within Madhya Pradesh Location within India
- Coordinates: 23.633014°N 77.559887°E
- Country: India
- State: Madhya Pradesh
- District: Bhopal
- Tehsil: Berasia

Population (2011)
  - Total: 912
- Time zone: UTC+5:30 (IST)
- ISO 3166 code: MP-IN
- Census code: 482198

Jhikariya Khurd is a village in the Bhopal district of Madhya Pradesh, India. It is located in the Berasia tehsil.

== Demographics ==
According to the 2011 census of India, Jhikariya Khurd has 184 households. The effective literacy rate (i.e. the literacy rate of population excluding children aged 6 and below) is 74.87%.

Demographics (2011 Census)
	Total	Male	Female
Population	912	491	421
Children aged below 6 years	144	82	62
Scheduled caste	89	53	36
Scheduled tribe	0	0	0
Literates	575	333	242
Workers (all)	352	269	83
Main workers (total)	319	259	60
Main workers: Cultivators	108	99	9
Main workers: Agricultural labourers	208	157	51
Main workers: Household industry workers	0	0	0
Main workers: Other	3	3	0
Marginal workers (total)	33	10	23
Marginal workers: Cultivators	5	3	2
Marginal workers: Agricultural labourers	27	7	20
Marginal workers: Household industry workers	0	0	0
Marginal workers: Others	1	0	1
Non-workers	560	222	338
