= Garha Kalan =

- village
- Location within Madhya Pradesh Location within India
- Coordinates: 23.733124°N 77.342446°E
- Country: India
- State: Madhya Pradesh
- District: Bhopal
- Tehsil: Berasia

Population (2011)
  - Total: 2,136
- Time zone: UTC+5:30 (IST)
- ISO 3166 code: MP-IN
- Census code: 482128

Garha Kalan is a village in the Bhopal district of Madhya Pradesh, India. It is located in the Berasia tehsil.

== Demographics ==
According to the 2011 census of India, Garha Kalan has 390 households. The effective literacy rate (i.e. the literacy rate of population excluding children aged 6 and below) is 68.38%.

Demographics (2011 Census)
	Total	Male	Female
Population	2136	1094	1042
Children aged below 6 years	264	132	132
Scheduled caste	164	87	77
Scheduled tribe	298	156	142
Literates	1280	755	525
Workers (all)	1113	609	504
Main workers (total)	599	398	201
Main workers: Cultivators	253	222	31
Main workers: Agricultural labourers	298	138	160
Main workers: Household industry workers	14	10	4
Main workers: Other	34	28	6
Marginal workers (total)	514	211	303
Marginal workers: Cultivators	44	22	22
Marginal workers: Agricultural labourers	375	147	228
Marginal workers: Household industry workers	19	8	11
Marginal workers: Others	76	34	42
Non-workers	1023	485	538
