= Dam Kheda =

- village
- Location within Madhya Pradesh Location within India
- Coordinates: 23.6130109°N 77.553344°E
- Country: India
- State: Madhya Pradesh
- District: Bhopal
- Tehsil: Berasia
- Elevation: 476 m (1,562 ft)

Population (2011)
  - Total: 1,951
- Time zone: UTC+5:30 (IST)
- ISO 3166 code: MP-IN
- 2011 census code: 482263

Dam Kheda is a village in the Bhopal district of Madhya Pradesh, India. It is located in the Berasia tehsil.

== Demographics ==
According to the 2011 census of India, Dam Kheda has 377 households. The effective literacy rate (i.e. the literacy rate of population excluding children aged 6 and below) is 59.2%.

Demographics (2011 Census)
	Total	Male	Female
Population	1951	1031	920
Children aged below 6 years	336	169	167
Scheduled caste	593	312	281
Scheduled tribe	5	3	2
Literates	956	599	357
Workers (all)	664	475	189
Main workers (total)	459	402	57
Main workers: Cultivators	254	231	23
Main workers: Agricultural labourers	157	130	27
Main workers: Household industry workers	3	3	0
Main workers: Other	45	38	7
Marginal workers (total)	205	73	132
Marginal workers: Cultivators	64	24	40
Marginal workers: Agricultural labourers	127	41	86
Marginal workers: Household industry workers	3	2	1
Marginal workers: Others	11	6	5
Non-workers	1287	556	731
