= Umaraya =

- village
- Country: India
- State: Madhya Pradesh
- District: Bhopal
- Tehsil: Berasia

Population (2011)
  - Total: 643
- Time zone: UTC+5:30 (IST)
- ISO 3166 code: IN-MP
- Census code: 482045

Umaraya is a village in the Bhopal district of Madhya Pradesh, India. It is located in the Berasia tehsil.

== Demographics ==
According to the 2011 census of India, Umaraya has 111 households. The effective literacy rate (i.e. the literacy rate of population excluding children aged 6 and below) is 50.68%.

Demographics (2011 Census)
| | Total | Male | Female |
|---|---|---|---|
| Population | 643 | 351 | 292 |
| Children aged below 6 years | 128 | 70 | 58 |
| Scheduled caste | 223 | 119 | 104 |
| Scheduled tribe | 0 | 0 | 0 |
| Literates | 261 | 171 | 90 |
| Workers (all) | 307 | 165 | 142 |
| Main workers (total) | 178 | 131 | 47 |
| Main workers: Cultivators | 105 | 82 | 23 |
| Main workers: Agricultural labourers | 64 | 41 | 23 |
| Main workers: Household industry workers | 0 | 0 | 0 |
| Main workers: Other | 9 | 8 | 1 |
| Marginal workers (total) | 129 | 34 | 95 |
| Marginal workers: Cultivators | 1 | 0 | 1 |
| Marginal workers: Agricultural labourers | 126 | 34 | 92 |
| Marginal workers: Household industry workers | 1 | 0 | 1 |
| Marginal workers: Others | 1 | 0 | 1 |
| Non-workers | 336 | 186 | 150 |
