= Netapura =

- village
- Location within Madhya Pradesh Location within India
- Coordinates: 23.685350°N 77.284324°E
- Country: India
- State: Madhya Pradesh
- District: Bhopal
- Tehsil: Berasia

Population (2011)
  - Total: 326
- Time zone: UTC+5:30 (IST)
- ISO 3166 code: MP-IN
- Census code: 482126

Netapura is a village in the Bhopal district of Madhya Pradesh, India. It is located in the Berasia tehsil.

== Demographics ==
According to the 2011 census of India, Netapura has 73 households. The effective literacy rate (i.e. the literacy rate of population excluding children aged 6 and below) is 58.72%.

Demographics (2011 Census)
	Total	Male	Female
Population	326	166	160
Children aged below 6 years	45	22	23
Scheduled caste	0	0	0
Scheduled tribe	0	0	0
Literates	165	104	61
Workers (all)	238	123	115
Main workers (total)	142	74	68
Main workers: Cultivators	50	42	8
Main workers: Agricultural labourers	89	30	59
Main workers: Household industry workers	0	0	0
Main workers: Other	3	2	1
Marginal workers (total)	96	49	47
Marginal workers: Cultivators	2	1	1
Marginal workers: Agricultural labourers	83	43	40
Marginal workers: Household industry workers	2	1	1
Marginal workers: Others	9	4	5
Non-workers	88	43	45
