= Barkhedi =

- village
- Location within Madhya Pradesh Location within India
- Coordinates: 23.776686°N 77.416094°E
- Country: India
- State: Madhya Pradesh
- District: Bhopal
- Tehsil: Berasia

Population (2011)
  - Total: 382
- Time zone: UTC+5:30 (IST)
- ISO 3166 code: MP-IN
- Census code: 482147

Barkhedi is a village in the Bhopal district of Madhya Pradesh, India. It is located in the Berasia tehsil.

== Demographics ==
According to the 2011 census of India, Barkhedi has 69 households. The effective literacy rate (i.e. the literacy rate of population excluding children aged 6 and below) is 40.88%.

Demographics (2011 Census)
	Total	Male	Female
Population	382	194	188
Children aged below 6 years	86	38	48
Scheduled caste	10	5	5
Scheduled tribe	0	0	0
Literates	121	77	44
Workers (all)	161	82	79
Main workers (total)	154	79	75
Main workers: Cultivators	45	24	21
Main workers: Agricultural labourers	104	51	53
Main workers: Household industry workers	0	0	0
Main workers: Other	5	4	1
Marginal workers (total)	7	3	4
Marginal workers: Cultivators	1	0	1
Marginal workers: Agricultural labourers	1	0	1
Marginal workers: Household industry workers	1	1	0
Marginal workers: Others	4	2	2
Non-workers	221	112	109
