= Keetgarh =

- village
- Location within Madhya Pradesh Location within India
- Coordinates: 23.8047285°N 77.3238274°E
- Country: India
- State: Madhya Pradesh
- District: Bhopal
- Tehsil: Berasia
- Elevation: 533 m (1,749 ft)

Population (2011)
  - Total: 90
- Time zone: UTC+5:30 (IST)
- ISO 3166 code: MP-IN
- 2011 census code: 482332

Keetgarh is a village in the Bhopal district of Madhya Pradesh, India. It is located in the Berasia tehsil.

== Demographics ==
According to the 2011 census of India, Keetgarh has 17 households. The effective literacy rate (i.e. the literacy rate of population excluding children aged 6 and below) is 42.67%.

Demographics (2011 Census)
	Total	Male	Female
Population	90	54	36
Children aged below 6 years	15	9	6
Scheduled caste	0	0	0
Scheduled tribe	0	0	0
Literates	32	19	13
Workers (all)	44	27	17
Main workers (total)	27	20	7
Main workers: Cultivators	22	16	6
Main workers: Agricultural labourers	5	4	1
Main workers: Household industry workers	0	0	0
Main workers: Other	0	0	0
Marginal workers (total)	17	7	10
Marginal workers: Cultivators	3	2	1
Marginal workers: Agricultural labourers	11	4	7
Marginal workers: Household industry workers	1	0	1
Marginal workers: Others	2	1	1
Non-workers	46	27	19
