= Chapadiya =

- village
- Location within Madhya Pradesh Location within India
- Coordinates: 23.411583°N 76.615277°E
- Country: India
- State: Madhya Pradesh
- District: Bhopal
- Tehsil: Berasia
- Elevation: 455 m (1,493 ft)

Population (2011)
  - Total: 742
- Time zone: UTC+5:30 (IST)
- ISO 3166 code: MP-IN
- 2011 census code: 482235

Chapadiya is a village in the Bhopal district of Madhya Pradesh, India. It is located in the Berasia tehsil.

== Demographics ==
According to the 2011 census of India, Chapadiya has 163 households. The effective literacy rate (i.e. the literacy rate of population excluding children aged 6 and below) is 80.27%.

Demographics (2011 Census)
	Total	Male	Female
Population	742	387	355
Children aged below 6 years	149	78	71
Scheduled caste	47	22	25
Scheduled tribe	0	0	0
Literates	476	274	202
Workers (all)	360	186	174
Main workers (total)	88	70	18
Main workers: Cultivators	62	47	15
Main workers: Agricultural labourers	15	13	2
Main workers: Household industry workers	1	1	0
Main workers: Other	10	9	1
Marginal workers (total)	272	116	156
Marginal workers: Cultivators	3	2	1
Marginal workers: Agricultural labourers	204	78	126
Marginal workers: Household industry workers	10	0	10
Marginal workers: Others	55	36	19
Non-workers	382	201	181
