= Hiran Khedi =

- village
- Location within Madhya Pradesh Location within India
- Coordinates: 23.5629384°N 77.3697672°E
- Country: India
- State: Madhya Pradesh
- District: Bhopal
- Tehsil: Berasia
- Elevation: 487 m (1,598 ft)

Population (2011)
  - Total: 1,355
- Time zone: UTC+5:30 (IST)
- ISO 3166 code: MP-IN
- 2011 census code: 482252

Hiran Khedi is a village in the Bhopal district of Madhya Pradesh, India. It is located in the Berasia tehsil.

== Demographics ==
According to the 2011 census of India, Hiran Khedi has 295 households. The effective literacy rate (i.e. the literacy rate of population excluding children aged 6 and below) is 73.62%.

Demographics (2011 Census)
	Total	Male	Female
Population	1355	711	644
Children aged below 6 years	214	117	97
Scheduled caste	471	234	237
Scheduled tribe	7	5	2
Literates	840	503	337
Workers (all)	749	406	343
Main workers (total)	639	374	265
Main workers: Cultivators	61	54	7
Main workers: Agricultural labourers	555	304	251
Main workers: Household industry workers	5	3	2
Main workers: Other	18	13	5
Marginal workers (total)	110	32	78
Marginal workers: Cultivators	1	1	0
Marginal workers: Agricultural labourers	104	30	74
Marginal workers: Household industry workers	0	0	0
Marginal workers: Others	5	1	4
Non-workers	606	305	301
