= Bhonrasa =

- village
- Location within Madhya Pradesh Location within India
- Coordinates: 23.6145598°N 77.4644607°E
- Country: India
- State: Madhya Pradesh
- District: Bhopal
- Tehsil: Berasia
- Elevation: 480 m (1,570 ft)

Population (2011)
  - Total: 970
- Time zone: UTC+5:30 (IST)
- ISO 3166 code: MP-IN
- 2011 census code: 482258

Bhonrasa is a village in the Bhopal district of Madhya Pradesh, India. It is located in the Berasia tehsil.

== Demographics ==
According to the 2011 census of India, Bhonrasa has 186 households. The effective literacy rate (i.e. the literacy rate of population excluding children aged 6 and below) is 59.79%.

Demographics (2011 Census)
	Total	Male	Female
Population	970	480	490
Children aged below 6 years	219	98	121
Scheduled caste	50	29	21
Scheduled tribe	275	125	150
Literates	449	254	195
Workers (all)	307	220	87
Main workers (total)	159	146	13
Main workers: Cultivators	53	49	4
Main workers: Agricultural labourers	48	45	3
Main workers: Household industry workers	2	2	0
Main workers: Other	56	50	6
Marginal workers (total)	148	74	74
Marginal workers: Cultivators	8	6	2
Marginal workers: Agricultural labourers	99	36	63
Marginal workers: Household industry workers	2	2	0
Marginal workers: Others	39	30	9
Non-workers	663	260	403
