= Kadia Khoh =

Kadia Khoh Kadaia Khoh
- village
- Location within Madhya Pradesh Location within India
- Coordinates: 23.635479°N 77.292664°E
- Country: India
- State: Madhya Pradesh
- District: Bhopal
- Tehsil: Berasia

Population (2011)
  - Total: 698
- Time zone: UTC+5:30 (IST)
- ISO 3166 code: MP-IN
- Census code: 482110

Kadia Khoh is a village in the Bhopal district of Madhya Pradesh, India. It is located in the Berasia tehsil.

== Demographics ==
According to the 2011 census of India, Kadia Khoh has 143 households. The effective literacy rate (i.e. the literacy rate of population excluding children aged 6 and below) is 60.07%.

Demographics (2011 Census)
	Total	Male	Female
Population	698	361	337
Children aged below 6 years	107	55	52
Scheduled caste	196	104	92
Scheduled tribe	19	7	12
Literates	355	252	103
Workers (all)	362	207	155
Main workers (total)	299	170	129
Main workers: Cultivators	177	103	74
Main workers: Agricultural labourers	119	65	54
Main workers: Household industry workers	0	0	0
Main workers: Other	3	2	1
Marginal workers (total)	63	37	26
Marginal workers: Cultivators	38	21	17
Marginal workers: Agricultural labourers	22	13	9
Marginal workers: Household industry workers	0	0	0
Marginal workers: Others	3	3	0
Non-workers	336	154	182
