= Goria Sankheda =

- village
- Location within Madhya Pradesh Location within India
- Coordinates: 23.5635863°N 77.3065952°E
- Country: India
- State: Madhya Pradesh
- District: Bhopal
- Tehsil: Berasia
- Elevation: 491 m (1,611 ft)

Population (2011)
  - Total: 718
- Time zone: UTC+5:30 (IST)
- ISO 3166 code: MP-IN
- 2011 census code: 482241

Goria Sankheda is a village in the Bhopal district of Madhya Pradesh, India. It is located in the Berasia tehsil.

== Demographics ==
According to the 2011 census of India, Goria Sankheda has 176 households. The effective literacy rate (i.e. the literacy rate of population excluding children aged 6 and below) is 44.39%.

Demographics (2011 Census)
| | Total | Male | Female |
|---|---|---|---|
| Population | 718 | 376 | 342 |
| Children aged below 6 years | 130 | 64 | 66 |
| Scheduled caste | 64 | 31 | 33 |
| Scheduled tribe | 0 | 0 | 0 |
| Literates | 261 | 214 | 47 |
| Workers (all) | 327 | 163 | 164 |
| Main workers (total) | 139 | 135 | 4 |
| Main workers: Cultivators | 134 | 132 | 2 |
| Main workers: Agricultural labourers | 2 | 2 | 0 |
| Main workers: Household industry workers | 0 | 0 | 0 |
| Main workers: Other | 3 | 1 | 2 |
| Marginal workers (total) | 188 | 28 | 160 |
| Marginal workers: Cultivators | 114 | 2 | 112 |
| Marginal workers: Agricultural labourers | 72 | 26 | 46 |
| Marginal workers: Household industry workers | 0 | 0 | 0 |
| Marginal workers: Others | 2 | 0 | 2 |
| Non-workers | 391 | 213 | 178 |
