= Kadia Chabar =

- village
- Location within Madhya Pradesh Location within India
- Coordinates: 23.624838°N 77.308929°E
- Country: India
- State: Madhya Pradesh
- District: Bhopal
- Tehsil: Berasia

Population (2011)
  - Total: 1,313
- Time zone: UTC+5:30 (IST)
- ISO 3166 code: MP-IN
- Census code: 482111

Kadia Chabar is a village in the Bhopal district of Madhya Pradesh, India. It is located in the Berasia tehsil.

== Demographics ==
According to the 2011 census of India, Kadia Chabar has 242 households. The effective literacy rate (i.e. the literacy rate of population excluding children aged 6 and below) is 64.3%.

Demographics (2011 Census)
	Total	Male	Female
Population	1313	667	646
Children aged below 6 years	215	117	98
Scheduled caste	139	74	65
Scheduled tribe	0	0	0
Literates	706	444	262
Workers (all)	607	317	290
Main workers (total)	384	220	164
Main workers: Cultivators	341	193	148
Main workers: Agricultural labourers	37	22	15
Main workers: Household industry workers	0	0	0
Main workers: Other	6	5	1
Marginal workers (total)	223	97	126
Marginal workers: Cultivators	59	20	39
Marginal workers: Agricultural labourers	161	76	85
Marginal workers: Household industry workers	0	0	0
Marginal workers: Others	3	1	2
Non-workers	706	350	356
