= Gujartodi =

- village
- Location within Madhya Pradesh Location within India
- Coordinates: 23.743793°N 77.403195°E
- Country: India
- State: Madhya Pradesh
- District: Bhopal
- Tehsil: Berasia

Population (2011)
  - Total: 760
- Time zone: UTC+5:30 (IST)
- ISO 3166 code: MP-IN
- Census code: 482135

Gujartodi is a village in the Bhopal district of Madhya Pradesh, India. It is located in the Berasia tehsil.

== Demographics ==
According to the 2011 census of India, Gujartodi has 162 households. The effective literacy rate (i.e. the literacy rate of population excluding children aged 6 and below) is 49.66%.

Demographics (2011 Census)
	Total	Male	Female
Population	760	394	366
Children aged below 6 years	170	83	87
Scheduled caste	159	78	81
Scheduled tribe	4	3	1
Literates	293	175	118
Workers (all)	324	201	123
Main workers (total)	56	51	5
Main workers: Cultivators	37	36	1
Main workers: Agricultural labourers	8	7	1
Main workers: Household industry workers	0	0	0
Main workers: Other	11	8	3
Marginal workers (total)	268	150	118
Marginal workers: Cultivators	107	64	43
Marginal workers: Agricultural labourers	96	54	42
Marginal workers: Household industry workers	17	16	1
Marginal workers: Others	48	16	32
Non-workers	436	193	243
