= Madnai =

- village
- Location within Madhya Pradesh Location within India
- Coordinates: 23.5809561°N 77.3755084°E
- Country: India
- State: Madhya Pradesh
- District: Bhopal
- Tehsil: Berasia
- Elevation: 478 m (1,568 ft)

Population (2011)
  - Total: 22
- Time zone: UTC+5:30 (IST)
- ISO 3166 code: MP-IN
- 2011 census code: 482249

Madnai is a village in the Bhopal district of Madhya Pradesh, India. It is located in the Berasia tehsil.

== Demographics ==
According to the 2011 census of India, Madnai has 5 households. The effective literacy rate (i.e. the literacy rate of population excluding children aged 6 and below) is 83.33%.

Demographics (2011 Census)
	Total	Male	Female
Population	22	10	12
Children aged below 6 years	4	0	4
Scheduled caste	0	0	0
Scheduled tribe	5	2	3
Literates	15	9	6
Workers (all)	9	6	3
Main workers (total)	1	1	0
Main workers: Cultivators	1	1	0
Main workers: Agricultural labourers	0	0	0
Main workers: Household industry workers	0	0	0
Main workers: Other	0	0	0
Marginal workers (total)	8	5	3
Marginal workers: Cultivators	5	4	1
Marginal workers: Agricultural labourers	2	1	1
Marginal workers: Household industry workers	1	0	1
Marginal workers: Others	0	0	0
Non-workers	13	4	9
