= Sheshapura =

- village
- Location within Madhya Pradesh Location within India
- Coordinates: 23.717988°N 77.335314°E
- Country: India
- State: Madhya Pradesh
- District: Bhopal
- Tehsil: Berasia
- Elevation: 480 m (1,570 ft)

Population (2011)
  - Total: 303
- Time zone: UTC+5:30 (IST)
- ISO 3166 code: MP-IN
- 2011 census code: 482340

Sheshapura is a village located in the Bhopal district of Madhya Pradesh, India. It is located in the Berasia tehsil.

== Demographics ==
According to the 2011 census of India, Sheshapura has 71 households. The effective literacy rate (i.e. the literacy rate of population excluding children aged 6 and below) is 52.29%.

Demographics (2011 Census)
	Total	Male	Female
Population	303	152	151
Children aged below 6 years	41	18	23
Scheduled caste	0	0	0
Scheduled tribe	0	0	0
Literates	137	72	65
Workers (all)	172	90	82
Main workers (total)	53	51	2
Main workers: Cultivators	52	50	2
Main workers: Agricultural labourers	1	1	0
Main workers: Household industry workers	0	0	0
Main workers: Other	0	0	0
Marginal workers (total)	119	39	80
Marginal workers: Cultivators	56	8	48
Marginal workers: Agricultural labourers	61	30	31
Marginal workers: Household industry workers	2	1	1
Marginal workers: Others	0	0	0
Non-workers	131	62	69
