= Barkheda Kalan =

- village
- Location within Madhya Pradesh Location within India
- Coordinates: 23.749138°N 77.218221°E
- Country: India
- State: Madhya Pradesh
- District: Bhopal
- Tehsil: Berasia

Population (2011)
  - Total: 786
- Time zone: UTC+5:30 (IST)
- ISO 3166 code: MP-IN
- Census code: 482075

Barkheda Kalan is a village in the Bhopal district of Madhya Pradesh, India. It is located in the Berasia tehsil.

== Demographics ==
According to the 2011 census of India, Barkheda Kalan has 155 households. The effective literacy rate (i.e. the literacy rate of population excluding children aged 6 and below) is 61.45%.

Demographics (2011 Census)
	Total	Male	Female
Population	786	375	411
Children aged below 6 years	122	57	65
Scheduled caste	147	71	76
Scheduled tribe	0	0	0
Literates	408	238	170
Workers (all)	400	192	208
Main workers (total)	175	156	19
Main workers: Cultivators	140	133	7
Main workers: Agricultural labourers	23	12	11
Main workers: Household industry workers	1	1	0
Main workers: Other	11	10	1
Marginal workers (total)	225	36	189
Marginal workers: Cultivators	132	7	125
Marginal workers: Agricultural labourers	77	22	55
Marginal workers: Household industry workers	8	4	4
Marginal workers: Others	8	3	5
Non-workers	386	183	203
