= Majidgarh =

- village
- Location within Madhya Pradesh Location within India
- Coordinates: 23.880712°N 77.334335°E
- Country: India
- State: Madhya Pradesh
- District: Bhopal
- Tehsil: Berasia

Population (2011)
  - Total: 906
- Time zone: UTC+5:30 (IST)
- ISO 3166 code: MP-IN
- Census code: 482049

Majidgarh is a village in the Bhopal district of Madhya Pradesh, India. It is located in the Berasia tehsil.

== Demographics ==
According to the 2011 census of India, Majidgarh has 185 households. The effective literacy rate (i.e. the literacy rate of population excluding children aged 6 and below) is 68.09%.

Demographics (2011 Census)
	Total	Male	Female
Population	906	472	434
Children aged below 6 years	157	72	85
Scheduled caste	251	133	118
Scheduled tribe	0	0	0
Literates	510	329	181
Workers (all)	221	170	51
Main workers (total)	14	11	3
Main workers: Cultivators	2	2	0
Main workers: Agricultural labourers	0	0	0
Main workers: Household industry workers	0	0	0
Main workers: Other	12	9	3
Marginal workers (total)	207	159	48
Marginal workers: Cultivators	108	90	18
Marginal workers: Agricultural labourers	87	61	26
Marginal workers: Household industry workers	0	0	0
Marginal workers: Others	12	8	4
Non-workers	685	302	383
