= Barkheda Baramad Gunga =

- village
- Location within Madhya Pradesh Location within India
- Coordinates: 23.542425°N 77.444647°E
- Country: India
- State: Madhya Pradesh
- District: Bhopal
- Tehsil: Berasia

Population (2011)
  - Total: 2,055
- Time zone: UTC+5:30 (IST)
- ISO 3166 code: MP-IN
- Census code: 482310

Barkheda Baramad Gunga is a village in the Bhopal district of Madhya Pradesh, India. It is located in the Berasia tehsil.

== Demographics ==
According to the 2011 census of India, Barkheda Baramad Gunga has 451 households. The effective literacy rate (i.e. the literacy rate of population excluding children aged 6 and below) is 71.31%.

Demographics (2011 Census)
	Total	Male	Female
Population	2055	1130	925
Children aged below 6 years	267	144	123
Scheduled caste	553	306	247
Scheduled tribe	16	12	4
Literates	1275	812	463
Workers (all)	927	569	358
Main workers (total)	835	562	273
Main workers: Cultivators	438	308	130
Main workers: Agricultural labourers	317	193	124
Main workers: Household industry workers	3	2	1
Main workers: Other	77	59	18
Marginal workers (total)	92	7	85
Marginal workers: Cultivators	65	5	60
Marginal workers: Agricultural labourers	18	0	18
Marginal workers: Household industry workers	0	0	0
Marginal workers: Others	9	2	7
Non-workers	1128	561	567
