= Saloi Sangraj =

- village
- Location within Madhya Pradesh Location within India
- Coordinates: 23.657911°N 77.396226°E
- Country: India
- State: Madhya Pradesh
- District: Bhopal
- Tehsil: Berasia

Population (2011)
  - Total: 491
- Time zone: UTC+5:30 (IST)
- ISO 3166 code: MP-IN
- Census code: 482210

Saloi Sangraj is a village in the Bhopal district of Madhya Pradesh, India. It is located in the Berasia tehsil.

== Demographics ==
According to the 2011 census of India, Saloi Sangraj has 104 households. The effective literacy rate (i.e. the literacy rate of population excluding children aged 6 and below) is 67%.

Demographics (2011 Census)
	Total	Male	Female
Population	491	262	229
Children aged below 6 years	91	46	45
Scheduled caste	12	7	5
Scheduled tribe	0	0	0
Literates	268	168	100
Workers (all)	233	136	97
Main workers (total)	225	132	93
Main workers: Cultivators	43	42	1
Main workers: Agricultural labourers	161	78	83
Main workers: Household industry workers	7	2	5
Main workers: Other	14	10	4
Marginal workers (total)	8	4	4
Marginal workers: Cultivators	0	0	0
Marginal workers: Agricultural labourers	7	4	3
Marginal workers: Household industry workers	0	0	0
Marginal workers: Others	1	0	1
Non-workers	258	126	132
