= Mahuwa Kheda =

- village
- Location within Madhya Pradesh Location within India
- Coordinates: 23.6326473°N 77.3640257°E483
- Country: India
- State: Madhya Pradesh
- District: Bhopal
- Tehsil: Berasia

Population (2011)
  - Total: 394
- Time zone: UTC+5:30 (IST)
- ISO 3166 code: MP-IN
- 2011 census code: 482227

Mahuwa Kheda is a village in the Bhopal district of Madhya Pradesh, India. It is located in the Berasia tehsil.

== Demographics ==
According to the 2011 census of India, Mahuwa Kheda has 81 households. The effective literacy rate (i.e. the literacy rate of population excluding children aged 6 and below) is 56.16%.

Demographics (2011 Census)
	Total	Male	Female
Population	394	213	181
Children aged below 6 years	61	33	28
Scheduled caste	30	13	17
Scheduled tribe	24	16	8
Literates	187	123	64
Workers (all)	206	112	94
Main workers (total)	52	47	5
Main workers: Cultivators	50	45	5
Main workers: Agricultural labourers	2	2	0
Main workers: Household industry workers	0	0	0
Main workers: Other	0	0	0
Marginal workers (total)	154	65	89
Marginal workers: Cultivators	1	0	1
Marginal workers: Agricultural labourers	151	64	87
Marginal workers: Household industry workers	0	0	0
Marginal workers: Others	2	1	1
Non-workers	188	101	87
