= Dhamantori =

- village
- Location within Madhya Pradesh Location within India
- Coordinates: 23.797895°N 77.225332°E
- Country: India
- State: Madhya Pradesh
- District: Bhopal
- Tehsil: Berasia

Population (2011)
  - Total: 655
- Time zone: UTC+5:30 (IST)
- ISO 3166 code: MP-IN
- Census code: 482060

Dhamantori is a village in the Bhopal district of Madhya Pradesh, India. It is located in the Berasia tehsil.

== Demographics ==
According to the 2011 census of India, Dhamantori has 144 households. The effective literacy rate (i.e. the literacy rate of population excluding children aged 6 and below) is 42.14%.

Demographics (2011 Census)
| | Total | Male | Female |
|---|---|---|---|
| Population | 655 | 334 | 321 |
| Children aged below 6 years | 114 | 51 | 63 |
| Scheduled caste | 168 | 86 | 82 |
| Scheduled tribe | 21 | 10 | 11 |
| Literates | 228 | 154 | 74 |
| Workers (all) | 347 | 191 | 156 |
| Main workers (total) | 334 | 184 | 150 |
| Main workers: Cultivators | 55 | 42 | 13 |
| Main workers: Agricultural labourers | 278 | 141 | 137 |
| Main workers: Household industry workers | 0 | 0 | 0 |
| Main workers: Other | 1 | 1 | 0 |
| Marginal workers (total) | 13 | 7 | 6 |
| Marginal workers: Cultivators | 1 | 1 | 0 |
| Marginal workers: Agricultural labourers | 10 | 5 | 5 |
| Marginal workers: Household industry workers | 0 | 0 | 0 |
| Marginal workers: Others | 2 | 1 | 1 |
| Non-workers | 308 | 143 | 165 |
