= Kulhor =

- village
- Location within Madhya Pradesh Location within India
- Coordinates: 23.641727°N 77.518787°E
- Country: India
- State: Madhya Pradesh
- District: Bhopal
- Tehsil: Berasia

Population (2011)
  - Total: 2,111
- Time zone: UTC+5:30 (IST)
- ISO 3166 code: MP-IN
- Census code: 482196

Kulhor is a village in the Bhopal district of Madhya Pradesh, India. It is located in the Berasia tehsil.

== Demographics ==
According to the 2011 census of India, Kulhor has 448 households. The effective literacy rate (i.e. the literacy rate of population excluding children aged 6 and below) is 70.85%.

Demographics (2011 Census)
	Total	Male	Female
Population	2111	1109	1002
Children aged below 6 years	320	164	156
Scheduled caste	877	466	411
Scheduled tribe	2	1	1
Literates	1269	782	487
Workers (all)	867	583	284
Main workers (total)	680	506	174
Main workers: Cultivators	399	297	102
Main workers: Agricultural labourers	180	133	47
Main workers: Household industry workers	2	1	1
Main workers: Other	99	75	24
Marginal workers (total)	187	77	110
Marginal workers: Cultivators	46	16	30
Marginal workers: Agricultural labourers	129	53	76
Marginal workers: Household industry workers	1	1	0
Marginal workers: Others	11	7	4
Non-workers	1244	526	718
