= Dhoot Khedi =

- village
- Location within Madhya Pradesh Location within India
- Coordinates: 23.685280°N 77.195543°E
- Country: India
- State: Madhya Pradesh
- District: Bhopal
- Tehsil: Berasia

Population (2011)
  - Total: 949
- Time zone: UTC+5:30 (IST)
- ISO 3166 code: MP-IN
- Census code: 482093

Dhoot Khedi is a village in the Bhopal district of Madhya Pradesh, India. It is located in the Berasia tehsil.

== Demographics ==
According to the 2011 census of India, Dhoot Khedi has 188 households. The effective literacy rate (i.e. the literacy rate of population excluding children aged 6 and below) is 62.61%.

Demographics (2011 Census)
	Total	Male	Female
Population	949	499	450
Children aged below 6 years	176	85	91
Scheduled caste	234	126	108
Scheduled tribe	41	25	16
Literates	484	319	165
Workers (all)	469	274	195
Main workers (total)	440	269	171
Main workers: Cultivators	117	110	7
Main workers: Agricultural labourers	296	136	160
Main workers: Household industry workers	0	0	0
Main workers: Other	27	23	4
Marginal workers (total)	29	5	24
Marginal workers: Cultivators	3	0	3
Marginal workers: Agricultural labourers	25	5	20
Marginal workers: Household industry workers	0	0	0
Marginal workers: Others	1	0	1
Non-workers	480	225	255
