= Borpura =

- village
- Location within Madhya Pradesh Location within India
- Coordinates: 23.7009224°N 77.3410569°E
- Country: India
- State: Madhya Pradesh
- District: Bhopal
- Tehsil: Berasia
- Elevation: 486 m (1,594 ft)

Population (2011)
  - Total: 216
- Time zone: UTC+5:30 (IST)
- ISO 3166 code: MP-IN
- 2011 census code: 482214

Borpura is a village in the Bhopal district of Madhya Pradesh, India. It is located in the Berasia tehsil.

== Demographics ==
According to the 2011 census of India, Borpura has 45 households. The effective literacy rate (i.e. the literacy rate of population excluding children aged 6 and below) is 51.79%.

Demographics (2011 Census)
	Total	Male	Female
Population	216	121	95
Children aged below 6 years	48	33	15
Scheduled caste	132	80	52
Scheduled tribe	0	0	0
Literates	87	50	37
Workers (all)	106	55	51
Main workers (total)	95	53	42
Main workers: Cultivators	76	41	35
Main workers: Agricultural labourers	18	12	6
Main workers: Household industry workers	0	0	0
Main workers: Other	1	0	1
Marginal workers (total)	11	2	9
Marginal workers: Cultivators	6	1	5
Marginal workers: Agricultural labourers	3	0	3
Marginal workers: Household industry workers	2	1	1
Marginal workers: Others	0	0	0
Non-workers	110	66	44
