= Bhakwaha =

- village
- Location within Madhya Pradesh Location within India
- Coordinates: 23.742166°N 77.235413°E
- Country: India
- State: Madhya Pradesh
- District: Bhopal
- Tehsil: Berasia

Population (2011)
  - Total: 577
- Time zone: UTC+5:30 (IST)
- ISO 3166 code: MP-IN
- Census code: 482076

Bhakwaha is a village in the Bhopal district of Madhya Pradesh, India. It is located in the Berasia tehsil.

== Demographics ==
According to the 2011 census of India, Bhakwaha has 96 households. The effective literacy rate (i.e. the literacy rate of population excluding children aged 6 and below) is 70%.

Demographics (2011 Census)
	Total	Male	Female
Population	577	302	275
Children aged below 6 years	97	53	44
Scheduled caste	203	105	98
Scheduled tribe	10	4	6
Literates	336	197	139
Workers (all)	223	149	74
Main workers (total)	214	149	65
Main workers: Cultivators	88	86	2
Main workers: Agricultural labourers	86	33	53
Main workers: Household industry workers	1	1	0
Main workers: Other	39	29	10
Marginal workers (total)	9	0	9
Marginal workers: Cultivators	2	0	2
Marginal workers: Agricultural labourers	5	0	5
Marginal workers: Household industry workers	0	0	0
Marginal workers: Others	2	0	2
Non-workers	354	153	201
