= Sapaua =

- village
- Location within Madhya Pradesh Location within India
- Coordinates: 23.5930293°N 77.4874049°E
- Country: India
- State: Madhya Pradesh
- District: Bhopal
- Tehsil: Berasia
- Elevation: 482 m (1,581 ft)

Population (2011)
  - Total: 725
- Time zone: UTC+5:30 (IST)
- ISO 3166 code: MP-IN
- 2011 census code: 482260

Sapaua is a village in the Bhopal district of Madhya Pradesh, India. It is located in the Berasia tehsil.

== Demographics ==
According to the 2011 census of India, Sapaua has 145 households. The effective literacy rate (i.e. the literacy rate of population excluding children aged 6 and below) is 62.77%.

Demographics (2011 Census)
	Total	Male	Female
Population	725	382	343
Children aged below 6 years	83	52	31
Scheduled caste	170	95	75
Scheduled tribe	0	0	0
Literates	403	255	148
Workers (all)	382	212	170
Main workers (total)	192	182	10
Main workers: Cultivators	147	139	8
Main workers: Agricultural labourers	39	38	1
Main workers: Household industry workers	0	0	0
Main workers: Other	6	5	1
Marginal workers (total)	190	30	160
Marginal workers: Cultivators	112	15	97
Marginal workers: Agricultural labourers	77	15	62
Marginal workers: Household industry workers	0	0	0
Marginal workers: Others	1	0	1
Non-workers	343	170	173
