= Majheda Majhedi =

- village
- Location within Madhya Pradesh Location within India
- Coordinates: 23.7555766°N 77.2951057°E
- Country: India
- State: Madhya Pradesh
- District: Bhopal
- Tehsil: Berasia
- Elevation: 467 m (1,532 ft)

Population (2011)
  - Total: 317
- Time zone: UTC+5:30 (IST)
- ISO 3166 code: IN-MP
- 2011 census code: 482338

Majheda Majhedi is a village in the Bhopal district of Madhya Pradesh, India. It is located in the Berasia tehsil.

== Demographics ==
According to the 2011 census of India, Majheda Majhedi has 67 households. The effective literacy rate (i.e. the literacy rate of population excluding children aged 6 and below) is 57.41%.

Demographics (2011 Census)
	Total	Male	Female
Population	317	176	141
Children aged below 6 years	54	33	21
Scheduled caste	3	2	1
Scheduled tribe	0	0	0
Literates	151	104	47
Workers (all)	157	87	70
Main workers (total)	74	72	2
Main workers: Cultivators	57	56	1
Main workers: Agricultural labourers	16	16	0
Main workers: Household industry workers	0	0	0
Main workers: Other	1	0	1
Marginal workers (total)	83	15	68
Marginal workers: Cultivators	1	1	0
Marginal workers: Agricultural labourers	82	14	68
Marginal workers: Household industry workers	0	0	0
Marginal workers: Others	0	0	0
Non-workers	160	89	71
