= Ramtek, Bhopal =

Ramtek
- village
- Location within Madhya Pradesh Location within India
- Coordinates: 23.6936504°N 77.3238274°E
- Country: India
- State: Madhya Pradesh
- District: Bhopal
- Tehsil: Berasia
- Elevation: 518 m (1,699 ft)

Population (2011)
  - Total: 113
- Time zone: UTC+5:30 (IST)
- ISO 3166 code: MP-IN
- 2011 census code: 482341

Ramtek is a village in the Bhopal district of Madhya Pradesh, India. It is located in the Berasia tehsil.

== Demographics ==
According to the 2011 census of India, Ramtek has 26 households. The effective literacy rate (i.e. the literacy rate of population excluding children aged 6 and below) is 51.52%.

Demographics (2011 Census)
	Total	Male	Female
Population	113	62	51
Children aged below 6 years	14	8	6
Scheduled caste	0	0	0
Scheduled tribe	0	0	0
Literates	51	31	20
Workers (all)	86	48	38
Main workers (total)	52	29	23
Main workers: Cultivators	17	17	0
Main workers: Agricultural labourers	35	12	23
Main workers: Household industry workers	0	0	0
Main workers: Other	0	0	0
Marginal workers (total)	34	19	15
Marginal workers: Cultivators	0	0	0
Marginal workers: Agricultural labourers	34	19	15
Marginal workers: Household industry workers	0	0	0
Marginal workers: Others	0	0	0
Non-workers	27	14	13
