= Hamid Khedi =

- village
- Location within Madhya Pradesh Location within India
- Coordinates: 23.688537°N 77.574842°E
- Country: India
- State: Madhya Pradesh
- District: Bhopal
- Tehsil: Berasia

Population (2011)
  - Total: 622
- Time zone: UTC+5:30 (IST)
- ISO 3166 code: MP-IN
- Census code: 482176

Hamid Khedi is a village in the Bhopal district of Madhya Pradesh, India. It is located in the Berasia tehsil.

== Demographics ==
According to the 2011 census of India, Hamid Khedi has 152 households. The effective literacy rate (i.e. the literacy rate of population excluding children aged 6 and below) is 73.28%.

Demographics (2011 Census)
	Total	Male	Female
Population	622	349	273
Children aged below 6 years	83	52	31
Scheduled caste	70	45	25
Scheduled tribe	0	0	0
Literates	395	248	147
Workers (all)	231	189	42
Main workers (total)	132	111	21
Main workers: Cultivators	74	69	5
Main workers: Agricultural labourers	46	36	10
Main workers: Household industry workers	0	0	0
Main workers: Other	12	6	6
Marginal workers (total)	99	78	21
Marginal workers: Cultivators	3	3	0
Marginal workers: Agricultural labourers	91	72	19
Marginal workers: Household industry workers	0	0	0
Marginal workers: Others	5	3	2
Non-workers	391	160	231
