= Dojyai =

- village
- Location within Madhya Pradesh Location within India
- Coordinates: 23.731368°N 77.570547°E
- Country: India
- State: Madhya Pradesh
- District: Bhopal
- Tehsil: Berasia

Population (2011)
  - Total: 558
- Time zone: UTC+5:30 (IST)
- ISO 3166 code: MP-IN
- Census code: 482168

Dojyai is a village in the Bhopal district of Madhya Pradesh, India. It is located in the Berasia tehsil.

== Demographics ==
According to the 2011 census of India, Dojyai has 114 households. The effective literacy rate (i.e. the literacy rate of population excluding children aged 6 and below) is 51.12%.

Demographics (2011 Census)
	Total	Male	Female
Population	558	298	260
Children aged below 6 years	112	56	56
Scheduled caste	166	91	75
Scheduled tribe	0	0	0
Literates	228	155	73
Workers (all)	267	142	125
Main workers (total)	145	133	12
Main workers: Cultivators	63	61	2
Main workers: Agricultural labourers	82	72	10
Main workers: Household industry workers	0	0	0
Main workers: Other	0	0	0
Marginal workers (total)	122	9	113
Marginal workers: Cultivators	7	2	5
Marginal workers: Agricultural labourers	110	7	103
Marginal workers: Household industry workers	0	0	0
Marginal workers: Others	5	0	5
Non-workers	291	156	135
