= Megra Kalan =

Mengra Kalan
- village
- Location within Madhya Pradesh Location within India
- Coordinates: 23.682043°N 77.473583°E
- Country: India
- State: Madhya Pradesh
- District: Bhopal
- Tehsil: Berasia

Population (2011)
  - Total: 1,368
- Time zone: UTC+5:30 (IST)
- PIN: 463111
- ISO 3166 code: MP-IN
- Census code: 482199

Megra Kalan is a village in the Bhopal district of Madhya Pradesh, India. It is located in the Berasia tehsil.

== Demographics ==
According to the 2011 census of India, Megra Kalan has 292 households. The effective literacy rate (i.e. the literacy rate of population excluding children aged 6 and below) is 73.49%.

Demographics (2011 Census)
	Total	Male	Female
Population	1368	727	641
Children aged below 6 years	206	96	110
Scheduled caste	438	238	200
Scheduled tribe	0	0	0
Literates	854	543	311
Workers (all)	552	374	178
Main workers (total)	267	229	38
Main workers: Cultivators	191	168	23
Main workers: Agricultural labourers	24	17	7
Main workers: Household industry workers	0	0	0
Main workers: Other	52	44	8
Marginal workers (total)	285	145	140
Marginal workers: Cultivators	208	93	115
Marginal workers: Agricultural labourers	46	30	16
Marginal workers: Household industry workers	7	3	4
Marginal workers: Others	24	19	5
Non-workers	816	353	463
