= Danderi =

- village
- Location within Madhya Pradesh Location within India
- Coordinates: 23.750331°N 77.313495°E
- Country: India
- State: Madhya Pradesh
- District: Bhopal
- Tehsil: Berasia

Population (2011)
  - Total: 88
- Time zone: UTC+5:30 (IST)
- ISO 3166 code: MP-IN
- Census code: 482116

Danderi is a village in the Bhopal district of Madhya Pradesh, India. It is located in the Berasia tehsil.

== Demographics ==
According to the 2011 census of India, Danderi has 17 households. The effective literacy rate (i.e. the literacy rate of population excluding children aged 6 and below) is 41.56%.

Demographics (2011 Census)
	Total	Male	Female
Population	88	52	36
Children aged below 6 years	11	8	3
Scheduled caste	11	7	4
Scheduled tribe	4	2	2
Literates	32	25	7
Workers (all)	52	30	22
Main workers (total)	21	12	9
Main workers: Cultivators	4	4	0
Main workers: Agricultural labourers	17	8	9
Main workers: Household industry workers	0	0	0
Main workers: Other	0	0	0
Marginal workers (total)	31	18	13
Marginal workers: Cultivators	1	1	0
Marginal workers: Agricultural labourers	26	15	11
Marginal workers: Household industry workers	0	0	0
Marginal workers: Others	4	2	2
Non-workers	36	22	14
