= Dhamarra =

- village
- Location within Madhya Pradesh Location within India
- Coordinates: 23.5461116°N 77.3518241°E
- Country: India
- State: Madhya Pradesh
- District: Bhopal
- Tehsil: Berasia
- Elevation: 504 m (1,654 ft)

Population (2011)
  - Total: 3,398
- Time zone: UTC+5:30 (IST)
- ISO 3166 code: MP-IN
- 2011 census code: 482244

Dhamarra is a village in the Bhopal district of Madhya Pradesh, India. It is located in the Berasia tehsil.

== Demographics ==
According to the 2011 census of India, Dhamarra has 705 households. The effective literacy rate (i.e. the literacy rate of population excluding children aged 6 and below) is 72.91%.

Demographics (2011 Census)
	Total	Male	Female
Population	3398	1741	1657
Children aged below 6 years	504	248	256
Scheduled caste	1086	578	508
Scheduled tribe	53	23	30
Literates	2110	1242	868
Workers (all)	1508	922	586
Main workers (total)	862	596	266
Main workers: Cultivators	228	186	42
Main workers: Agricultural labourers	470	277	193
Main workers: Household industry workers	4	3	1
Main workers: Other	160	130	30
Marginal workers (total)	646	326	320
Marginal workers: Cultivators	120	58	62
Marginal workers: Agricultural labourers	495	245	250
Marginal workers: Household industry workers	3	1	2
Marginal workers: Others	28	22	6
Non-workers	1890	819	1071
