= Imalia Narendra =

Imalia Narendra Imaliya Narendra
- village
- Location within Madhya Pradesh Location within India
- Coordinates: 23.6290651°N 77.4988753°E
- Country: India
- State: Madhya Pradesh
- District: Bhopal
- Tehsil: Berasia
- Elevation: 470 m (1,540 ft)

Population (2011)
  - Total: 1,296
- Time zone: UTC+5:30 (IST)
- ISO 3166 code: MP-IN
- 2011 census code: 482262

Imalia Narendra is a village in the Bhopal district of Madhya Pradesh, India. It is located in the Berasia tehsil.

== Demographics ==
According to the 2011 census of India, Imalia Narendra has 251 households. The effective literacy rate (i.e. the literacy rate of population excluding children aged 6 and below) is 65.64%.

Demographics (2011 Census)
	Total	Male	Female
Population	1296	673	623
Children aged below 6 years	228	111	117
Scheduled caste	509	266	243
Scheduled tribe	9	5	4
Literates	701	436	265
Workers (all)	451	303	148
Main workers (total)	243	232	11
Main workers: Cultivators	176	168	8
Main workers: Agricultural labourers	13	13	0
Main workers: Household industry workers	1	0	1
Main workers: Other	53	51	2
Marginal workers (total)	208	71	137
Marginal workers: Cultivators	28	17	11
Marginal workers: Agricultural labourers	140	35	105
Marginal workers: Household industry workers	19	8	11
Marginal workers: Others	21	11	10
Non-workers	845	370	475
