= Pipaliya Kadim =

- village
- Location within Madhya Pradesh Location within India
- Coordinates: 23.4871424°N 77.4443807°E
- Country: India
- State: Madhya Pradesh
- District: Bhopal
- Tehsil: Berasia
- Elevation: 468 m (1,535 ft)

Population (2011)
  - Total: 846
- Time zone: UTC+5:30 (IST)
- ISO 3166 code: MP-IN
- 2011 census code: 482320

Pipaliya Kadim is a village in the Bhopal district of Madhya Pradesh, India. It is located in the Berasia tehsil.

== Demographics ==
According to the 2011 census of India, Pipaliya Kadim has 191 households. The effective literacy rate (i.e. the literacy rate of population excluding children aged 6 and below) is 69.34%.

Demographics (2011 Census)
	Total	Male	Female
Population	846	442	404
Children aged below 6 years	148	83	65
Scheduled caste	204	114	90
Scheduled tribe	0	0	0
Literates	484	297	187
Workers (all)	390	220	170
Main workers (total)	151	83	68
Main workers: Cultivators	115	63	52
Main workers: Agricultural labourers	29	15	14
Main workers: Household industry workers	2	2	0
Main workers: Other	5	3	2
Marginal workers (total)	239	137	102
Marginal workers: Cultivators	53	36	17
Marginal workers: Agricultural labourers	178	96	82
Marginal workers: Household industry workers	3	1	2
Marginal workers: Others	5	4	1
Non-workers	456	222	234
