= Dhekpur =

- village
- Location within Madhya Pradesh Location within India
- Coordinates: 23.680214°N 77.437912°E
- Country: India
- State: Madhya Pradesh
- District: Bhopal
- Tehsil: Berasia

Population (2011)
  - Total: 1,085
- Time zone: UTC+5:30 (IST)
- ISO 3166 code: MP-IN
- Census code: 482208

Dhekpur is a village in the Bhopal district of Madhya Pradesh, India. It is located in the Berasia tehsil, on the banks of Baanh river.

== Demographics ==
According to the 2011 census of India, Dhekpur has 233 households. The effective literacy rate (i.e. the literacy rate of population excluding children aged 6 and below) is 63.32%.

Demographics (2011 Census)
	Total	Male	Female
Population	1085	579	506
Children aged below 6 years	188	91	97
Scheduled caste	552	285	267
Scheduled tribe	4	3	1
Literates	568	366	202
Workers (all)	536	283	253
Main workers (total)	103	87	16
Main workers: Cultivators	60	54	6
Main workers: Agricultural labourers	37	32	5
Main workers: Household industry workers	1	0	1
Main workers: Other	5	1	4
Marginal workers (total)	433	196	237
Marginal workers: Cultivators	4	3	1
Marginal workers: Agricultural labourers	322	168	154
Marginal workers: Household industry workers	92	18	74
Marginal workers: Others	15	7	8
Non-workers	549	296	253
