= Garha Brahman =

- village
- Location within Madhya Pradesh Location within India
- Coordinates: 23.869307°N 77.357166°E
- Country: India
- State: Madhya Pradesh
- District: Bhopal
- Tehsil: Berasia

Population (2011)
  - Total: 1,013
- Time zone: UTC+5:30 (IST)
- ISO 3166 code: MP-IN
- Census code: 482050

Garha Brahman is a village in the Bhopal district of Madhya Pradesh, India. It is located in the Berasia tehsil.

== Demographics ==
According to the 2011 census of India, Garha Brahman has 194 households. The effective literacy rate (i.e. the literacy rate of population excluding children aged 6 and below) is 49.22%.

Demographics (2011 Census)
	Total	Male	Female
Population	1013	566	447
Children aged below 6 years	182	107	75
Scheduled caste	141	79	62
Scheduled tribe	0	0	0
Literates	409	277	132
Workers (all)	458	251	207
Main workers (total)	68	61	7
Main workers: Cultivators	47	45	2
Main workers: Agricultural labourers	14	9	5
Main workers: Household industry workers	4	4	0
Main workers: Other	3	3	0
Marginal workers (total)	390	190	200
Marginal workers: Cultivators	6	3	3
Marginal workers: Agricultural labourers	367	177	190
Marginal workers: Household industry workers	1	0	1
Marginal workers: Others	16	10	6
Non-workers	555	315	240
