= Barkheda Khurd =

- village
- Location within Madhya Pradesh Location within India
- Coordinates: 23.803067°N 77.277582°E
- Country: India
- State: Madhya Pradesh
- District: Bhopal
- Tehsil: Berasia

Population (2011)
  - Total: 609
- Time zone: UTC+5:30 (IST)
- ISO 3166 code: MP-IN
- Census code: 482059

Barkheda Khurd is a village in the Bhopal district of Madhya Pradesh, India. It is located in the Berasia tehsil.

== Demographics ==
According to the 2011 census of India, Barkheda Khurd has 148 households. The effective literacy rate (i.e. the literacy rate of population excluding children aged 6 and below) is 50.3%.

Demographics (2011 Census)
	Total	Male	Female
Population	609	322	287
Children aged below 6 years	116	63	53
Scheduled caste	241	122	119
Scheduled tribe	0	0	0
Literates	248	154	94
Workers (all)	322	189	133
Main workers (total)	52	37	15
Main workers: Cultivators	39	27	12
Main workers: Agricultural labourers	12	9	3
Main workers: Household industry workers	0	0	0
Main workers: Other	1	1	0
Marginal workers (total)	270	152	118
Marginal workers: Cultivators	4	3	1
Marginal workers: Agricultural labourers	262	146	116
Marginal workers: Household industry workers	0	0	0
Marginal workers: Others	4	3	1
Non-workers	287	133	154
