= Manpura, Bhopal =

Manpura
- village
- Location within Madhya Pradesh Location within India
- Coordinates: 23.754260°N 77.540910°E
- Country: India
- State: Madhya Pradesh
- District: Bhopal
- Tehsil: Berasia

Population (2011)
  - Total: 593
- Time zone: UTC+5:30 (IST)
- ISO 3166 code: IN-MP
- Census code: 482164

Manpura is a village in the Bhopal district of Madhya Pradesh, India. It is located in the Berasia tehsil.

== Demographics ==
According to the 2011 census of India, Manpura has 112 households. The effective literacy rate (i.e. the literacy rate of population excluding children aged 6 and below) is 46.88%.

Demographics (2011 Census)
	Total	Male	Female
Population	593	321	272
Children aged below 6 years	128	69	59
Scheduled caste	0	0	0
Scheduled tribe	284	147	137
Literates	218	149	69
Workers (all)	315	169	146
Main workers (total)	288	161	127
Main workers: Cultivators	142	109	33
Main workers: Agricultural labourers	140	49	91
Main workers: Household industry workers	1	1	0
Main workers: Other	5	2	3
Marginal workers (total)	27	8	19
Marginal workers: Cultivators	4	1	3
Marginal workers: Agricultural labourers	22	6	16
Marginal workers: Household industry workers	1	1	0
Marginal workers: Others	0	0	0
Non-workers	278	152	126
