= Parsora, Bhopal =

Parsora Goswami
- village
- Location within Madhya Pradesh Location within India
- Coordinates: 23.244753°N 77.798601°E
- Country: India
- State: Madhya Pradesh
- District: Bhopal
- Tehsil: Berasia

Government
  - Sarpnch: Lokesh Bharti (B.J.P.)

Population (2017)
  - Total: 3,500
- Time zone: UTC+5:30 (IST)
- ISO 3166 code: MP-IN
- Census code: 482123

Parsora is a village in the Bhopal district of Madhya Pradesh, India. It is located in the Berasia tehsil.

== Demographics ==
According to the 2011 census of India, Parsora has 207 households. The effective literacy rate (i.e. the literacy rate of population excluding children aged 6 and below) is 59.55%.

Demographics (2011 Census)
	Total	Male	Female
Population	895	4	419
Children aged below 6 years	141	68	73
Scheduled caste	103	54	49
Scheduled tribe	0	0	0
Literates	449	291	158
Workers (all)	555	296	259
Main workers (total)	323	197	126
Main workers: Cultivators	223	153	70
Main workers: Agricultural labourers	74	24	50
Main workers: Household industry workers	0	0	0
Main workers: Other	26	20	6
Marginal workers (total)	232	99	133
Marginal workers: Cultivators	22	7	15
Marginal workers: Agricultural labourers	187	72	115
Marginal workers: Household industry workers	4	3	1
Marginal workers: Others	19	17	2
Non-workers	340	180	160
