= Barbeli Kalan =

- village
- Location within Madhya Pradesh Location within India
- Coordinates: 23.778348°N 77.237288°E
- Country: India
- State: Madhya Pradesh
- District: Bhopal
- Tehsil: Berasia

Population (2011)
  - Total: 966
- Time zone: UTC+5:30 (IST)
- ISO 3166 code: MP-IN
- Census code: 482062

Barbeli Kalan is a village in the Bhopal district of Madhya Pradesh, India. It is located in the Berasia tehsil.

== Demographics ==
According to the 2011 census of India, Barbeli Kalan has 202 households. The effective literacy rate (i.e. the literacy rate of population excluding children aged 6 and below) is 51.52%.

Demographics (2011 Census)
	Total	Male	Female
Population	966	499	467
Children aged below 6 years	141	71	70
Scheduled caste	70	39	31
Scheduled tribe	32	19	13
Literates	425	266	159
Workers (all)	346	279	67
Main workers (total)	267	248	19
Main workers: Cultivators	184	179	5
Main workers: Agricultural labourers	77	67	10
Main workers: Household industry workers	1	0	1
Main workers: Other	5	2	3
Marginal workers (total)	79	31	48
Marginal workers: Cultivators	9	5	4
Marginal workers: Agricultural labourers	61	22	39
Marginal workers: Household industry workers	2	0	2
Marginal workers: Others	7	4	3
Non-workers	620	220	400
