= Bhens Kheda =

Bhens Kheda Bhains Kheda
- village
- Location within Madhya Pradesh Location within India
- Coordinates: 23.4633769°N 77.4759334°E
- Country: India
- State: Madhya Pradesh
- District: Bhopal
- Tehsil: Berasia
- Elevation: 464 m (1,522 ft)

Population (2011)
  - Total: 1,250
- Time zone: UTC+5:30 (IST)
- ISO 3166 code: MP-IN
- 2011 census code: 482322

Bhens Kheda is a village in the Bhopal district of Madhya Pradesh, India. It is located in the Berasia tehsil.

== Demographics ==
According to the 2011 census of India, Bhens Kheda has 268 households. The effective literacy rate (i.e. the literacy rate of population excluding children aged 6 and below) is 75.28%.

Demographics (2011 Census)
	Total	Male	Female
Population	1250	675	575
Children aged below 6 years	255	139	116
Scheduled caste	446	241	205
Scheduled tribe	4	1	3
Literates	749	453	296
Workers (all)	471	319	152
Main workers (total)	433	297	136
Main workers: Cultivators	204	166	38
Main workers: Agricultural labourers	211	119	92
Main workers: Household industry workers	1	0	1
Main workers: Other	17	12	5
Marginal workers (total)	38	22	16
Marginal workers: Cultivators	1	0	1
Marginal workers: Agricultural labourers	31	17	14
Marginal workers: Household industry workers	2	1	1
Marginal workers: Others	4	4	0
Non-workers	779	356	423
