= Laloi =

- village
- Location within Madhya Pradesh Location within India
- Coordinates: 23.6383406°N 77.3266991°E
- Country: India
- State: Madhya Pradesh
- District: Bhopal
- Tehsil: Berasia
- Elevation: 493 m (1,617 ft)

Population (2011)
  - Total: 1,862
- Time zone: UTC+5:30 (IST)
- ISO 3166 code: MP-IN
- 2011 census code: 482223

Laloi is a village in the Bhopal district of Madhya Pradesh, India. It is located in the Berasia tehsil.

== Demographics ==
According to the 2011 census of India, Laloi has 378 households. The effective literacy rate (i.e. the literacy rate of population excluding children aged 6 and below) is 71.86%.

Demographics (2011 Census)
| | Total | Male | Female |
|---|---|---|---|
| Population | 1862 | 957 | 905 |
| Children aged below 6 years | 341 | 168 | 173 |
| Scheduled caste | 488 | 249 | 239 |
| Scheduled tribe | 107 | 56 | 51 |
| Literates | 1093 | 689 | 404 |
| Workers (all) | 879 | 491 | 388 |
| Main workers (total) | 204 | 183 | 21 |
| Main workers: Cultivators | 139 | 134 | 5 |
| Main workers: Agricultural labourers | 13 | 11 | 2 |
| Main workers: Household industry workers | 8 | 5 | 3 |
| Main workers: Other | 44 | 33 | 11 |
| Marginal workers (total) | 675 | 308 | 367 |
| Marginal workers: Cultivators | 84 | 27 | 57 |
| Marginal workers: Agricultural labourers | 556 | 259 | 297 |
| Marginal workers: Household industry workers | 19 | 10 | 9 |
| Marginal workers: Others | 16 | 12 | 4 |
| Non-workers | 983 | 466 | 517 |
