= Barrichheer Kheda =

Barri chheler khedavillage in Madhya Pradesh, India

Barrichheer Kheda Baricheer Kheda
- village
- Location within Madhya Pradesh Location within India
- Coordinates: 23.6245045°N 77.4788014°E
- Country: India
- State: Madhya Pradesh
- District: Bhopal
- Tehsil: Berasia
- Elevation: 474 m (1,555 ft)

Population (2011)
  - Total: 647
- Time zone: UTC+5:30 (IST)
- ISO 3166 code: IN-MP
- 2011 census code: 482257

Barri chheerKheda is a village in the Bhopal district of Madhya Pradesh, India. It is located in the Berasia tehsil.

== Demographics ==
According to the 2011 census of India, Barrichheer Kheda has 117 households. The effective literacy rate (i.e. the literacy rate of population excluding children aged 6 and below) is 77.68%.

Demographics (2011 Census)
	Total	Male	Female
Population	647	377	270
Children aged below 6 years	87	55	32
Scheduled caste	289	170	119
Scheduled tribe	6	4	2
Literates	435	293	142
Workers (all)	189	163	26
Main workers (total)	178	158	20
Main workers: Cultivators	49	45	4
Main workers: Agricultural labourers	117	103	14
Main workers: Household industry workers	0	0	0
Main workers: Other	12	10	2
Marginal workers (total)	11	5	6
Marginal workers: Cultivators	3	3	0
Marginal workers: Agricultural labourers	7	1	6
Marginal workers: Household industry workers	0	0	0
Marginal workers: Others	1	1	0
Non-workers	458	214	244
