= Habibganj, Berasia =

Habibganj
- village
- Location within Madhya Pradesh Location within India
- Coordinates: 23.6569846°N 77.3755084°E
- Country: India
- State: Madhya Pradesh
- District: Bhopal
- Tehsil: Berasia
- Elevation: 478 m (1,568 ft)

Population (2011)
  - Total: 1,762
- Time zone: UTC+5:30 (IST)
- ISO 3166 code: MP-IN
- 2011 census code: 482226

Habibganj is a village in the Bhopal district of Madhya Pradesh, India. It is located in the Berasia tehsil.

== Demographics ==
According to the 2011 census of India, Habibganj has 383 households. The effective literacy rate (i.e. the literacy rate of population excluding children aged 6 and below) is 55.95%.

Demographics (2011 Census)
| | Total | Male | Female |
|---|---|---|---|
| Population | 1762 | 933 | 829 |
| Children aged below 6 years | 350 | 191 | 159 |
| Scheduled caste | 200 | 104 | 96 |
| Scheduled tribe | 55 | 24 | 31 |
| Literates | 790 | 497 | 293 |
| Workers (all) | 821 | 476 | 345 |
| Main workers (total) | 507 | 431 | 76 |
| Main workers: Cultivators | 371 | 315 | 56 |
| Main workers: Agricultural labourers | 88 | 75 | 13 |
| Main workers: Household industry workers | 4 | 4 | 0 |
| Main workers: Other | 44 | 37 | 7 |
| Marginal workers (total) | 314 | 45 | 269 |
| Marginal workers: Cultivators | 121 | 13 | 108 |
| Marginal workers: Agricultural labourers | 183 | 25 | 158 |
| Marginal workers: Household industry workers | 5 | 3 | 2 |
| Marginal workers: Others | 5 | 4 | 1 |
| Non-workers | 941 | 457 | 484 |
