= Unida, Bhopal =

Unida
- village
- Location within Madhya Pradesh Location within India
- Coordinates: 23.4583183°N 77.3065952°E
- Country: India
- State: Madhya Pradesh
- District: Bhopal
- Tehsil: Berasia
- Elevation: 503 m (1,650 ft)

Population (2011)
  - Total: 1,011
- Time zone: UTC+5:30 (IST)
- ISO 3166 code: MP-IN
- 2011 census code: 482295

Unida is a village in the Bhopal district of Madhya Pradesh, India. It is located in the Berasia tehsil.

== Demographics ==
According to the 2011 census of India, Unida has 184 households. The effective literacy rate (i.e. the literacy rate of population excluding children aged 6 and below) is 53.3%.

Demographics (2011 Census)
	Total	Male	Female
Population	1011	513	498
Children aged below 6 years	208	113	95
Scheduled caste	0	0	0
Scheduled tribe	0	0	0
Literates	428	250	178
Workers (all)	499	261	238
Main workers (total)	410	235	175
Main workers: Cultivators	187	126	61
Main workers: Agricultural labourers	194	94	100
Main workers: Household industry workers	4	1	3
Main workers: Other	25	14	11
Marginal workers (total)	89	26	63
Marginal workers: Cultivators	6	3	3
Marginal workers: Agricultural labourers	69	18	51
Marginal workers: Household industry workers	7	3	4
Marginal workers: Others	7	2	5
Non-workers	512	252	260
