= Bagapura =

- village
- Location within Madhya Pradesh Location within India
- Coordinates: 23.70764509°N 77.35254765°E
- Country: India
- State: Madhya Pradesh
- District: Bhopal
- Tehsil: Berasia
- Elevation: 486 m (1,594 ft)

Population (2011)
  - Total: 613
- Time zone: UTC+5:30 (IST)
- ISO 3166 code: MP-IN
- 2011 census code: 482213

Bagapura is a village in the Bhopal district of Madhya Pradesh, India. It is located in the Berasia tehsil.

== Demographics ==
According to the 2011 census of India, Bagapura has 117 households. The effective literacy rate (i.e. the literacy rate of population excluding children aged 6 and below) is 62.94%.

Demographics (2011 Census)
	Total	Male	Female
Population	613	323	290
Children aged below 6 years	103	57	46
Scheduled caste	32	16	16
Scheduled tribe	0	0	0
Literates	321	207	114
Workers (all)	342	176	166
Main workers (total)	319	170	149
Main workers: Cultivators	298	155	143
Main workers: Agricultural labourers	10	7	3
Main workers: Household industry workers	0	0	0
Main workers: Other	11	8	3
Marginal workers (total)	23	6	17
Marginal workers: Cultivators	11	2	9
Marginal workers: Agricultural labourers	12	4	8
Marginal workers: Household industry workers	0	0	0
Marginal workers: Others	0	0	0
Non-workers	271	147	124
