= Syar Kalan =

- village
- Location within Madhya Pradesh Location within India
- Coordinates: 23.789320°N 77.365878°E
- Country: India
- State: Madhya Pradesh
- District: Bhopal
- Tehsil: Berasia

Population (2011)
  - Total: 289
- Time zone: UTC+5:30 (IST)
- ISO 3166 code: MP-IN
- Census code: 482071

Syar Kalan is a village in the Bhopal district of Madhya Pradesh, India. It is located in the Berasia tehsil.

== Demographics ==
According to the 2011 census of India, Syar Kalan has 62 households. The effective literacy rate (i.e. the literacy rate of population excluding children aged 6 and below) is 50.44%.

Demographics (2011 Census)
	Total	Male	Female
Population	289	155	134
Children aged below 6 years	61	34	27
Scheduled caste	46	23	23
Scheduled tribe	0	0	0
Literates	115	69	46
Workers (all)	154	83	71
Main workers (total)	67	59	8
Main workers: Cultivators	33	29	4
Main workers: Agricultural labourers	33	30	3
Main workers: Household industry workers	0	0	0
Main workers: Other	1	0	1
Marginal workers (total)	87	24	63
Marginal workers: Cultivators	8	5	3
Marginal workers: Agricultural labourers	79	19	60
Marginal workers: Household industry workers	0	0	0
Marginal workers: Others	0	0	0
Non-workers	135	72	63
