= Hingoni =

- village
- Location within Madhya Pradesh Location within India
- Coordinates: 23.713972°N 77.564834°E
- Country: India
- State: Madhya Pradesh
- District: Bhopal
- Tehsil: Berasia

Population (2011)
  - Total: 653
- Time zone: UTC+5:30 (IST)
- ISO 3166 code: MP-IN
- Census code: 482188

Hingoni is a village in the Bhopal district of Madhya Pradesh, India. It is located in the Berasia tehsil.

== Demographics ==
According to the 2011 census of India, Hingoni has 144 households. The effective literacy rate (i.e. the literacy rate of population excluding children aged 6 and below) is 65.67%.

Demographics (2011 Census)
	Total	Male	Female
Population	653	332	321
Children aged below 6 years	149	78	71
Scheduled caste	392	203	189
Scheduled tribe	0	0	0
Literates	331	195	136
Workers (all)	162	146	16
Main workers (total)	148	141	7
Main workers: Cultivators	76	75	1
Main workers: Agricultural labourers	49	45	4
Main workers: Household industry workers	0	0	0
Main workers: Other	23	21	2
Marginal workers (total)	14	5	9
Marginal workers: Cultivators	0	0	0
Marginal workers: Agricultural labourers	13	4	9
Marginal workers: Household industry workers	1	1	0
Marginal workers: Others	0	0	0
Non-workers	491	186	305
