= Amalya, Bhopal =

Amalya
- village
- Location within Madhya Pradesh Location within India
- Coordinates: 23.873217°N 77.249934°E
- Country: India
- State: Madhya Pradesh
- District: Bhopal
- Tehsil: Berasia

Population (2011)
  - Total: 461
- Time zone: UTC+5:30 (IST)
- ISO 3166 code: MP-IN
- Census code: 482046

Amalya is a village in the Bhopal district of Madhya Pradesh, India. It is located in the Berasia tehsil.

== Demographics ==
According to the 2011 census of India, Amalya has 88 households. The effective literacy rate (i.e. the literacy rate of population excluding children aged 6 and below) is 51.72%.

Demographics (2011 Census)
	Total	Male	Female
Population	461	258	203
Children aged below 6 years	53	30	23
Scheduled caste	24	12	12
Scheduled tribe	0	0	0
Literates	211	148	63
Workers (all)	278	149	129
Main workers (total)	222	120	102
Main workers: Cultivators	187	108	79
Main workers: Agricultural labourers	31	9	22
Main workers: Household industry workers	0	0	0
Main workers: Other	4	3	1
Marginal workers (total)	56	29	27
Marginal workers: Cultivators	5	3	2
Marginal workers: Agricultural labourers	45	23	22
Marginal workers: Household industry workers	6	3	3
Marginal workers: Others	0	0	0
Non-workers	183	109	74
