= Dewalkheda =

- village
- Location within Madhya Pradesh Location within India
- Coordinates: 23.6485897°N 77.4156889°E
- Country: India
- State: Madhya Pradesh
- District: Bhopal
- Tehsil: Berasia
- Elevation: 467 m (1,532 ft)

Population (2011)
  - Total: 557
- Time zone: UTC+5:30 (IST)
- ISO 3166 code: MP-IN
- 2011 census code: 482231

Dewalkheda is a village in the Bhopal district of Madhya Pradesh, India. It is located in the Berasia tehsil.

== Demographics ==
According to the 2011 census of India, Dewalkheda had 104 households. The effective literacy rate (i.e. the literacy rate of population excluding children aged 6 and below) was 70.79%.

Demographics (2011 Census)
| | Total | Male | Female |
|---|---|---|---|
| Population | 557 | 297 | 260 |
| Children aged below 6 years | 88 | 47 | 41 |
| Scheduled caste | 128 | 67 | 61 |
| Scheduled tribe | 0 | 0 | 0 |
| Literates | 332 | 204 | 128 |
| Workers (all) | 227 | 162 | 65 |
| Main workers (total) | 187 | 152 | 35 |
| Main workers: Cultivators | 110 | 97 | 13 |
| Main workers: Agricultural labourers | 56 | 37 | 19 |
| Main workers: Household industry workers | 0 | 0 | 0 |
| Main workers: Other | 21 | 18 | 3 |
| Marginal workers (total) | 40 | 10 | 30 |
| Marginal workers: Cultivators | 29 | 9 | 20 |
| Marginal workers: Agricultural labourers | 10 | 0 | 10 |
| Marginal workers: Household industry workers | 0 | 0 | 0 |
| Marginal workers: Others | 1 | 1 | 0 |
| Non-workers | 330 | 135 | 195 |
