= Pura Khana =

- village
- Location within Madhya Pradesh Location within India
- Coordinates: 23.745876°N 77.597216°E
- Country: India
- State: Madhya Pradesh
- District: Bhopal
- Tehsil: Berasia

Population (2011)
  - Total: 531
- Time zone: UTC+5:30 (IST)
- ISO 3166 code: MP-IN
- Census code: 482169

Pura Khana is a village in the Bhopal district of Madhya Pradesh, India. It is located in the Berasia tehsil.

== Demographics ==
According to the 2011 census of India, Pura Khana has 111 households. The effective literacy rate (i.e. the literacy rate of population excluding children aged 6 and below) is 62.16%.

Demographics (2011 Census)
	Total	Male	Female
Population	531	273	258
Children aged below 6 years	87	43	44
Scheduled caste	105	55	50
Scheduled tribe	0	0	0
Literates	276	170	106
Workers (all)	208	142	66
Main workers (total)	106	97	9
Main workers: Cultivators	45	43	2
Main workers: Agricultural labourers	50	46	4
Main workers: Household industry workers	0	0	0
Main workers: Other	11	8	3
Marginal workers (total)	102	45	57
Marginal workers: Cultivators	10	8	2
Marginal workers: Agricultural labourers	91	36	55
Marginal workers: Household industry workers	0	0	0
Marginal workers: Others	1	1	0
Non-workers	323	131	192
