= Jamusar Kalan =

- village
- Location within Madhya Pradesh Location within India
- Coordinates: 23.731535°N 77.479474°E
- Country: India
- State: Madhya Pradesh
- District: Bhopal
- Tehsil: Berasia

Population (2011)
  - Total: 2,825
- Time zone: UTC+5:30 (IST)
- ISO 3166 code: MP-IN
- Census code: 482154

Jamusar Kalan is a village in the Bhopal district of Madhya Pradesh, India. It is located in the Berasia tehsil.

== Demographics ==
According to the 2011 census of India, Jamusar Kalan has 556 households. The effective literacy rate (i.e. the literacy rate of population excluding children aged 6 and below) is 40.97%.

Demographics (2011 Census)
	Total	Male	Female
Population	2825	1546	1279
Children aged below 6 years	438	213	225
Scheduled caste	1191	651	540
Scheduled tribe	111	57	54
Literates	978	636	342
Workers (all)	1402	757	645
Main workers (total)	422	386	36
Main workers: Cultivators	328	322	6
Main workers: Agricultural labourers	42	25	17
Main workers: Household industry workers	12	7	5
Main workers: Other	40	32	8
Marginal workers (total)	980	371	609
Marginal workers: Cultivators	28	3	25
Marginal workers: Agricultural labourers	752	284	468
Marginal workers: Household industry workers	135	76	59
Marginal workers: Others	65	8	57
Non-workers	1423	789	634
