= Jajankhedi =

- village
- Location within Madhya Pradesh Location within India
- Coordinates: 23.648460°N 77.243765°E
- Country: India
- State: Madhya Pradesh
- District: Bhopal
- Tehsil: Berasia

Population (2011)
  - Total: 451
- Time zone: UTC+5:30 (IST)
- ISO 3166 code: MP-IN
- Census code: 482099

Jajankhedi is a village in the Bhopal district of Madhya Pradesh, India. It is located in the Berasia tehsil.

== Demographics ==
According to the 2011 census of India, Jajankhedi has 93 households. The effective literacy rate (i.e. the literacy rate of population excluding children aged 6 and below) is 55.08%.

Demographics (2011 Census)
	Total	Male	Female
Population	451	241	210
Children aged below 6 years	57	21	36
Scheduled caste	73	37	36
Scheduled tribe	0	0	0
Literates	217	148	69
Workers (all)	226	129	97
Main workers (total)	117	109	8
Main workers: Cultivators	100	95	5
Main workers: Agricultural labourers	6	4	2
Main workers: Household industry workers	1	1	0
Main workers: Other	10	9	1
Marginal workers (total)	109	20	89
Marginal workers: Cultivators	87	16	71
Marginal workers: Agricultural labourers	20	2	18
Marginal workers: Household industry workers	0	0	0
Marginal workers: Others	2	2	0
Non-workers	225	112	113
