= Ankia =

- village
- Location within Madhya Pradesh Location within India
- Coordinates: 23.729114°N 77.219135°E
- Country: India
- State: Madhya Pradesh
- District: Bhopal
- Tehsil: Berasia

Population (2011)
  - Total: 953
- Time zone: UTC+5:30 (IST)
- ISO 3166 code: MP-IN
- Census code: 482086

Ankia is a village in the Bhopal district of Madhya Pradesh, India. It is located in the Berasia tehsil.

== Demographics ==
According to the 2011 census of India, Ankia has 187 households. The effective literacy rate (i.e. the literacy rate of population excluding children aged 6 and below) is 59.95%.

Demographics (2011 Census)
	Total	Male	Female
Population	953	494	459
Children aged below 6 years	139	72	67
Scheduled caste	162	91	71
Scheduled tribe	28	15	13
Literates	488	294	194
Workers (all)	473	243	230
Main workers (total)	217	191	26
Main workers: Cultivators	107	100	7
Main workers: Agricultural labourers	85	75	10
Main workers: Household industry workers	3	3	0
Main workers: Other	22	13	9
Marginal workers (total)	256	52	204
Marginal workers: Cultivators	96	12	84
Marginal workers: Agricultural labourers	139	28	111
Marginal workers: Household industry workers	7	2	5
Marginal workers: Others	14	10	4
Non-workers	480	251	229
