= Dhonoura =

- village
- Location within Madhya Pradesh Location within India
- Coordinates: 23.659033°N 77.292710°E
- Country: India
- State: Madhya Pradesh
- District: Bhopal
- Tehsil: Berasia

Population (2011)
  - Total: 615
- Time zone: UTC+5:30 (IST)
- ISO 3166 code: MP-IN
- Census code: 482107

Dhonoura is a village in the Bhopal district of Madhya Pradesh, India. It is located in the Berasia tehsil.

== Demographics ==
According to the 2011 census of India, Dhonoura has 125 households. The effective literacy rate (i.e. the literacy rate of population excluding children aged 6 and below) is 64.54%.

Demographics (2011 Census)
	Total	Male	Female
Population	615	316	299
Children aged below 6 years	113	61	52
Scheduled caste	147	76	71
Scheduled tribe	0	0	0
Literates	324	200	124
Workers (all)	284	158	126
Main workers (total)	255	151	104
Main workers: Cultivators	133	90	43
Main workers: Agricultural labourers	97	47	50
Main workers: Household industry workers	7	3	4
Main workers: Other	18	11	7
Marginal workers (total)	29	7	22
Marginal workers: Cultivators	11	2	9
Marginal workers: Agricultural labourers	18	5	13
Marginal workers: Household industry workers	0	0	0
Marginal workers: Others	0	0	0
Non-workers	331	158	173
