= Chandbad Kadim =

- village
- Location within Madhya Pradesh Location within India
- Coordinates: 23.458791°N 77.388263°E
- Country: India
- State: Madhya Pradesh
- District: Bhopal
- Tehsil: Berasia

Population (2011)
  - Total: 468
- Time zone: UTC+5:30 (IST)
- ISO 3166 code: MP-IN
- Census code: 482298

Chandbad Kadim is a village in the Bhopal district of Madhya Pradesh, India. It is located in the Berasia tehsil.

== Demographics ==
According to the 2011 census of India, Chandbad Kadim has 102 households. The effective literacy rate (i.e. the literacy rate of population excluding children aged 6 and below) is 43.21%.

Demographics (2011 Census)
| | Total | Male | Female |
|---|---|---|---|
| Population | 468 | 243 | 225 |
| Children aged below 6 years | 100 | 47 | 53 |
| Scheduled caste | 6 | 2 | 4 |
| Scheduled tribe | 135 | 73 | 62 |
| Literates | 159 | 90 | 69 |
| Workers (all) | 234 | 142 | 92 |
| Main workers (total) | 41 | 24 | 17 |
| Main workers: Cultivators | 16 | 11 | 5 |
| Main workers: Agricultural labourers | 14 | 7 | 7 |
| Main workers: Household industry workers | 2 | 2 | 0 |
| Main workers: Other | 9 | 4 | 5 |
| Marginal workers (total) | 193 | 118 | 75 |
| Marginal workers: Cultivators | 1 | 1 | 0 |
| Marginal workers: Agricultural labourers | 156 | 103 | 53 |
| Marginal workers: Household industry workers | 1 | 1 | 0 |
| Marginal workers: Others | 35 | 13 | 22 |
| Non-workers | 234 | 101 | 133 |
