= Dolatpura =

- village
- Location within Madhya Pradesh Location within India
- Coordinates: 23.616854°N 77.326206°E
- Country: India
- State: Madhya Pradesh
- District: Bhopal
- Tehsil: Berasia

Population (2011)
  - Total: 1,009
- Time zone: UTC+5:30 (IST)
- ISO 3166 code: MP-IN
- Census code: 482112

Dolatpura is a village in the Bhopal district of Madhya Pradesh, India. It is located in the Berasia tehsil.

== Demographics ==
According to the 2011 census of India, Dolatpura has 198 households. The effective literacy rate (i.e. the literacy rate of population excluding children aged 6 and below) is 60.63%.

Demographics (2011 Census)
	Total	Male	Female
Population	1009	524	485
Children aged below 6 years	120	69	51
Scheduled caste	116	61	55
Scheduled tribe	0	0	0
Literates	539	331	208
Workers (all)	607	318	289
Main workers (total)	176	144	32
Main workers: Cultivators	150	132	18
Main workers: Agricultural labourers	25	11	14
Main workers: Household industry workers	0	0	0
Main workers: Other	1	1	0
Marginal workers (total)	431	174	257
Marginal workers: Cultivators	11	4	7
Marginal workers: Agricultural labourers	414	168	246
Marginal workers: Household industry workers	1	0	1
Marginal workers: Others	5	2	3
Non-workers	402	206	196
