= Nekli =

- village
- Location within Madhya Pradesh Location within India
- Coordinates: 23.773999°N 77.361684°E
- Country: India
- State: Madhya Pradesh
- District: Bhopal
- Tehsil: Berasia

Population (2011)
  - Total: 63
- Time zone: UTC+5:30 (IST)
- ISO 3166 code: MP-IN
- Census code: 482073

Nekli is a village in the Bhopal district of Madhya Pradesh, India. It is located in the Berasia tehsil.

== Demographics ==
According to the 2011 census of India, Nekli has 11 households. The effective literacy rate (i.e. the literacy rate of population excluding children aged 6 and below) is 67.92%.

Demographics (2011 Census)
	Total	Male	Female
Population	63	30	33
Children aged below 6 years	10	5	5
Scheduled caste	21	9	12
Scheduled tribe	0	0	0
Literates	36	18	18
Workers (all)	25	15	10
Main workers (total)	20	14	6
Main workers: Cultivators	10	8	2
Main workers: Agricultural labourers	6	4	2
Main workers: Household industry workers	3	2	1
Main workers: Other	1	0	1
Marginal workers (total)	5	1	4
Marginal workers: Cultivators	2	1	1
Marginal workers: Agricultural labourers	3	0	3
Marginal workers: Household industry workers	0	0	0
Marginal workers: Others	0	0	0
Non-workers	38	15	23
