= Shahodra =

- village
- Location within Madhya Pradesh Location within India
- Coordinates: 23.853029°N 77.231446°E
- Country: India
- State: Madhya Pradesh
- District: Bhopal
- Tehsil: Berasia

Population (2011)
  - Total: 113
- Time zone: UTC+5:30 (IST)
- PIN: 462120
- ISO 3166 code: MP-IN
- Census code: 482052

Shahodra is a village in the Bhopal district of Madhya Pradesh, India. It is located in the Berasia tehsil.

== Demographics ==
According to the 2011 census of India, Shahodra had 21 households. The effective literacy rate (i.e. the literacy rate of population excluding children aged 6 and below) was 43.33%.

Demographics (2011 census)
	Total	Male	Female
Population	113	54	59
Children aged below 6 years	23	8	15
Scheduled caste	0	0	0
Scheduled tribe	0	0	0
Literates	39	21	18
Workers (all)	55	29	26
Main workers (total)	30	19	11
Main workers: Cultivators	18	18	0
Main workers: Agricultural labourers	11	0	11
Main workers: Household industry workers	1	1	0
Main workers: Other	0	0	0
Marginal workers (total)	25	10	15
Marginal workers: Cultivators	1	1	0
Marginal workers: Agricultural labourers	23	8	15
Marginal workers: Household industry workers	0	0	0
Marginal workers: Others	1	1	0
Non-workers	58	25	33
