= Keetkhedi =

- village
- Location within Madhya Pradesh Location within India
- Coordinates: 23.663069°N 77.451742°E
- Country: India
- State: Madhya Pradesh
- District: Bhopal
- Tehsil: Berasia

Population (2011)
  - Total: 488
- Time zone: UTC+5:30 (IST)
- ISO 3166 code: MP-IN
- Census code: 482203

Keetkhedi is a village in the Bhopal district of Madhya Pradesh, India. It is located in the Berasia tehsil.

== Demographics ==
According to the 2011 census of India, Keetkhedi has 98 households. The effective literacy rate (i.e. the literacy rate of population excluding children aged 6 and below) is 61.29%.

Demographics (2011 Census)
	Total	Male	Female
Population	488	240	248
Children aged below 6 years	85	36	49
Scheduled caste	155	84	71
Scheduled tribe	2	1	1
Literates	247	139	108
Workers (all)	171	122	49
Main workers (total)	122	102	20
Main workers: Cultivators	40	32	8
Main workers: Agricultural labourers	70	66	4
Main workers: Household industry workers	0	0	0
Main workers: Other	12	4	8
Marginal workers (total)	49	20	29
Marginal workers: Cultivators	0	0	0
Marginal workers: Agricultural labourers	2	1	1
Marginal workers: Household industry workers	0	0	0
Marginal workers: Others	47	19	28
Non-workers	317	118	199
