= Nay Samand =

- village
- Location within Madhya Pradesh Location within India
- Coordinates: 23.7797°N 77.3838°E
- Country: India
- State: Madhya Pradesh
- District: Bhopal
- Tehsil: Berasia

Population (2011)
  - Total: 1,899
- Time zone: UTC+5:30 (IST)
- ISO 3166 code: MP-IN
- Census code: 482141

Nay Samand is a village in the Bhopal district of Madhya Pradesh, India. It is located in the Berasia tehsil.

== Demographics ==
According to the 2011 census of India, Nay Samand has 360 households. The effective literacy rate (i.e. the literacy rate of population excluding children aged 6 and below) is 65.81%.

Demographics (2011 Census)
	Total	Male	Female
Population	1899	995	904
Children aged below 6 years	337	170	167
Scheduled caste	588	305	283
Scheduled tribe	0	0	0
Literates	1028	619	409
Workers (all)	969	537	432
Main workers (total)	698	478	220
Main workers: Cultivators	260	216	44
Main workers: Agricultural labourers	298	154	144
Main workers: Household industry workers	27	19	8
Main workers: Other	113	89	24
Marginal workers (total)	271	59	212
Marginal workers: Cultivators	28	7	21
Marginal workers: Agricultural labourers	205	33	172
Marginal workers: Household industry workers	15	7	8
Marginal workers: Others	23	12	11
Non-workers	930	458	472
