= Jagmeri =

- village
- Location within Madhya Pradesh Location within India
- Coordinates: 23.736394°N 77.282172°E
- Country: India
- State: Madhya Pradesh
- District: Bhopal
- Tehsil: Berasia

Population (2011)
  - Total: 297
- Time zone: UTC+5:30 (IST)
- ISO 3166 code: MP-IN
- Census code: 482115

Jagmeri is a village in the Bhopal district of Madhya Pradesh, India. It is located in the Berasia tehsil.

== Demographics ==
According to the 2011 census of India, Jagmeri has 67 households. The effective literacy rate (i.e. the literacy rate of population excluding children aged 6 and below) is 53.88%.

Demographics (2011 Census)
	Total	Male	Female
Population	297	154	143
Children aged below 6 years	52	23	29
Scheduled caste	151	79	72
Scheduled tribe	0	0	0
Literates	132	86	46
Workers (all)	162	79	83
Main workers (total)	119	58	61
Main workers: Cultivators	9	9	0
Main workers: Agricultural labourers	110	49	61
Main workers: Household industry workers	0	0	0
Main workers: Other	0	0	0
Marginal workers (total)	43	21	22
Marginal workers: Cultivators	5	2	3
Marginal workers: Agricultural labourers	38	19	19
Marginal workers: Household industry workers	0	0	0
Marginal workers: Others	0	0	0
Non-workers	135	75	60
