= Khejra Babbar =

- village
- Location within Madhya Pradesh Location within India
- Coordinates: 23.5149904°N 77.4883235°E
- Country: India
- State: Madhya Pradesh
- District: Bhopal
- Tehsil: Berasia
- Elevation: 460 m (1,510 ft)

Population (2011)
  - Total: 375
- Time zone: UTC+5:30 (IST)
- ISO 3166 code: MP-IN
- 2011 census code: 482315

Khejra Babbar is a village in the Bhopal district of Madhya Pradesh, India. It is located in the Berasia tehsil.

== Demographics ==
According to the 2011 census of India, Khejra Babbar has 63 households. The effective literacy rate (i.e. the literacy rate of population excluding children aged 6 and below) is 68.2%.

Demographics (2011 Census)
	Total	Male	Female
Population	375	195	180
Children aged below 6 years	70	37	33
Scheduled caste	57	29	28
Scheduled tribe	0	0	0
Literates	208	122	86
Workers (all)	196	109	87
Main workers (total)	65	61	4
Main workers: Cultivators	64	61	3
Main workers: Agricultural labourers	0	0	0
Main workers: Household industry workers	0	0	0
Main workers: Other	1	0	1
Marginal workers (total)	131	48	83
Marginal workers: Cultivators	12	10	2
Marginal workers: Agricultural labourers	117	37	80
Marginal workers: Household industry workers	0	0	0
Marginal workers: Others	2	1	1
Non-workers	179	86	93
