= Khedi =

- village
- Location within Madhya Pradesh Location within India
- Coordinates: 23.4564088°N 77.3367498°E
- Country: India
- State: Madhya Pradesh
- District: Bhopal
- Tehsil: Berasia
- Elevation: 523 m (1,716 ft)

Population (2011)
  - Total: 400
- Time zone: UTC+5:30 (IST)
- ISO 3166 code: MP-IN
- 2011 census code: 482294

Khedi is a village in the Bhopal district of Madhya Pradesh, India. It is located in the Berasia tehsil.

== Demographics ==
According to the 2011 census of India, Khedi has 87 households. The effective literacy rate (i.e. the literacy rate of population excluding children aged 6 and below) is 68.35%.

Demographics (2011 Census)
	Total	Male	Female
Population	390	213	177
Children aged below 6 years	74	35	39
Scheduled caste	0	0	0
Scheduled tribe	0	0	0
Literates	216	142	74
Workers (all)	107	96	11
Main workers (total)	84	78	6
Main workers: Cultivators	59	57	2
Main workers: Agricultural labourers	23	20	3
Main workers: Household industry workers	0	0	0
Main workers: Other	2	1	1
Marginal workers (total)	23	18	5
Marginal workers: Cultivators	4	3	1
Marginal workers: Agricultural labourers	19	15	4
Marginal workers: Household industry workers	0	0	0
Marginal workers: Others	0	0	0
Non-workers	283	117	166
