= Mudia Kheda =

- village
- Location within Madhya Pradesh Location within India
- Coordinates: 23.4374738°N 77.3912953°E
- Country: India
- State: Madhya Pradesh
- District: Bhopal
- Tehsil: Berasia
- Elevation: 482 m (1,581 ft)

Population (2011)
  - Total: 564
- Time zone: UTC+5:30 (IST)
- ISO 3166 code: IN-MP
- 2011 census code: 482306

Mudia Kheda is a village in the Bhopal district of Madhya Pradesh, India. It is located in the Berasia tehsil.

== Demographics ==
According to the 2011 census of India, Mudia Kheda has 125 households. The effective literacy rate (i.e. the literacy rate of population excluding children aged 6 and below) is 66.03%.

Demographics (2011 Census)
	Total	Male	Female
Population	564	283	281
Children aged below 6 years	90	45	45
Scheduled caste	122	64	58
Scheduled tribe	0	0	0
Literates	313	180	133
Workers (all)	261	134	127
Main workers (total)	10	4	6
Main workers: Cultivators	0	0	0
Main workers: Agricultural labourers	7	2	5
Main workers: Household industry workers	0	0	0
Main workers: Other	3	2	1
Marginal workers (total)	251	130	121
Marginal workers: Cultivators	51	46	5
Marginal workers: Agricultural labourers	197	81	116
Marginal workers: Household industry workers	1	1	0
Marginal workers: Others	2	2	0
Non-workers	303	149	154
