= Rehtai =

- village
- Location within Madhya Pradesh Location within India
- Coordinates: 23.6062358°N 77.3984704°E
- Country: India
- State: Madhya Pradesh
- District: Bhopal
- Tehsil: Berasia
- Elevation: 475 m (1,558 ft)

Population (2011)
  - Total: 164
- Time zone: UTC+5:30 (IST)
- ISO 3166 code: MP-IN
- 2011 census code: 482234

Rehtai is a village in the Bhopal district of Madhya Pradesh, India. It is located in the Berasia tehsil.

== Demographics ==
According to the 2011 census of India, Rehtai has 31 households. The effective literacy rate (i.e. the literacy rate of population excluding children aged 6 and below) is 75%.

Demographics (2011 Census)
	Total	Male	Female
Population	164	81	83
Children aged below 6 years	20	8	12
Scheduled caste	14	5	9
Scheduled tribe	0	0	0
Literates	108	60	48
Workers (all)	83	39	44
Main workers (total)	25	23	2
Main workers: Cultivators	25	23	2
Main workers: Agricultural labourers	0	0	0
Main workers: Household industry workers	0	0	0
Main workers: Other	0	0	0
Marginal workers (total)	58	16	42
Marginal workers: Cultivators	0	0	0
Marginal workers: Agricultural labourers	58	16	42
Marginal workers: Household industry workers	0	0	0
Marginal workers: Others	0	0	0
Non-workers	81	42	39
