= Dhokapura =

- village
- Location within Madhya Pradesh Location within India
- Coordinates: 23.799106°N 77.419814°E
- Country: India
- State: Madhya Pradesh
- District: Bhopal
- Tehsil: Berasia

Population (2011)
  - Total: 147
- Time zone: UTC+5:30 (IST)
- ISO 3166 code: MP-IN
- Census code: 482145

Dhokapura is a village in the Bhopal district of Madhya Pradesh, India. It is located in the Berasia tehsil.

== Demographics ==
According to the 2011 census of India, Dhokapura has 22 households. The effective literacy rate (i.e. the literacy rate of population excluding children aged 6 and below) is 53.28%.

Demographics (2011 Census)
	Total	Male	Female
Population	147	79	68
Children aged below 6 years	25	13	12
Scheduled caste	0	0	0
Scheduled tribe	0	0	0
Literates	65	47	18
Workers (all)	58	34	24
Main workers (total)	18	14	4
Main workers: Cultivators	10	10	0
Main workers: Agricultural labourers	8	4	4
Main workers: Household industry workers	0	0	0
Main workers: Other	0	0	0
Marginal workers (total)	40	20	20
Marginal workers: Cultivators	9	6	3
Marginal workers: Agricultural labourers	31	14	17
Marginal workers: Household industry workers	0	0	0
Marginal workers: Others	0	0	0
Non-workers	89	45	44
