= Pipal Khedi =

- village
- Location within Madhya Pradesh Location within India
- Coordinates: 23.697608°N 77.515427°E
- Country: India
- State: Madhya Pradesh
- District: Bhopal
- Tehsil: Berasia

Population (2011)
  - Total: 11
- Time zone: UTC+5:30 (IST)
- ISO 3166 code: MP-IN
- Census code: 482158

Pipal Khedi is a village in the Bhopal district of Madhya Pradesh, India. It is located in the Berasia tehsil.

== Demographics ==
According to the 2011 census of India, Pipal Khedi has 3 households. The effective literacy rate (i.e. the literacy rate of population excluding children aged 6 and below) is 50%.

Demographics (2011 Census)
	Total	Male	Female
Population	11	6	5
Children aged below 6 years	5	3	2
Scheduled caste	0	0	0
Scheduled tribe	0	0	0
Literates	3	2	1
Workers (all)	3	3	0
Main workers (total)	3	3	0
Main workers: Cultivators	3	3	0
Main workers: Agricultural labourers	0	0	0
Main workers: Household industry workers	0	0	0
Main workers: Other	0	0	0
Marginal workers (total)	0	0	0
Marginal workers: Cultivators	0	0	0
Marginal workers: Agricultural labourers	0	0	0
Marginal workers: Household industry workers	0	0	0
Marginal workers: Others	0	0	0
Non-workers	8	3	5
