= Babukhedi =

Babukhedi Babu Khedi
- village
- Location within Madhya Pradesh Location within India
- Coordinates: 23.868252°N 77.233613°E
- Country: India
- State: Madhya Pradesh
- District: Bhopal
- Tehsil: Berasia

Population (2011)
  - Total: 321
- Time zone: UTC+5:30 (IST)
- ISO 3166 code: IN-MP
- Census code: 482044

Babukhedi is a village in the Bhopal district of Madhya Pradesh, India. It is located in the Berasia tehsil.

== Demographics ==
According to the 2011 census of India, Babukhedi has 66 households. The effective literacy rate (i.e. the literacy rate of population excluding children aged 6 and below) is 48.16%.

Demographics (2011 Census)
	Total	Male	Female
Population	321	165	156
Children aged below 6 years	49	24	25
Scheduled caste	77	37	40
Scheduled tribe	0	0	0
Literates	131	84	47
Workers (all)	203	102	101
Main workers (total)	120	91	29
Main workers: Cultivators	119	90	29
Main workers: Agricultural labourers	1	1	0
Main workers: Household industry workers	0	0	0
Main workers: Other	0	0	0
Marginal workers (total)	83	11	72
Marginal workers: Cultivators	78	11	67
Marginal workers: Agricultural labourers	5	0	5
Marginal workers: Household industry workers	0	0	0
Marginal workers: Others	0	0	0
Non-workers	118	63	55
