= Kadaiya Kalan =

- village
- Location within Madhya Pradesh Location within India
- Coordinates: 23.791131°N 77.268433°E
- Country: India
- State: Madhya Pradesh
- District: Bhopal
- Tehsil: Berasia

Population (2011)
  - Total: 1,061
- Time zone: UTC+5:30 (IST)
- ISO 3166 code: MP-IN
- Census code: 482065

Kadaiya Kalan is a village in the Bhopal district of Madhya Pradesh, India. It is located in the Berasia tehsil.

== Demographics ==
According to the 2011 census of India, Kadaiya Kalan has 256 households. The effective literacy rate (i.e. the literacy rate of population excluding children aged 6 and below) is 48.86%.

Demographics (2011 Census)
	Total	Male	Female
Population	1061	551	510
Children aged below 6 years	185	93	92
Scheduled caste	321	171	150
Scheduled tribe	36	18	18
Literates	428	245	183
Workers (all)	558	302	256
Main workers (total)	143	101	42
Main workers: Cultivators	28	17	11
Main workers: Agricultural labourers	108	79	29
Main workers: Household industry workers	0	0	0
Main workers: Other	7	5	2
Marginal workers (total)	415	201	214
Marginal workers: Cultivators	3	2	1
Marginal workers: Agricultural labourers	395	190	205
Marginal workers: Household industry workers	0	0	0
Marginal workers: Others	17	9	8
Non-workers	503	249	254
