= Gonda Khedi =

- village
- Location within Madhya Pradesh Location within India
- Coordinates: 23.670834°N 77.198048°E
- Country: India
- State: Madhya Pradesh
- District: Bhopal
- Tehsil: Berasia

Population (2011)
  - Total: 363
- Time zone: UTC+5:30 (IST)
- ISO 3166 code: MP-IN
- Census code: 482096

Gonda Khedi is a village in the Bhopal district of Madhya Pradesh, India. It is located in the Berasia tehsil.

== Demographics ==
According to the 2011 census of India, Gonda Khedi has 69 households. The effective literacy rate (i.e. the literacy rate of population excluding children aged 6 and below) is 48.8%.

Demographics (2011 Census)
	Total	Male	Female
Population	363	172	191
Children aged below 6 years	72	35	37
Scheduled caste	37	18	19
Scheduled tribe	0	0	0
Literates	142	86	56
Workers (all)	200	102	98
Main workers (total)	180	97	83
Main workers: Cultivators	143	78	65
Main workers: Agricultural labourers	33	18	15
Main workers: Household industry workers	0	0	0
Main workers: Other	4	1	3
Marginal workers (total)	20	5	15
Marginal workers: Cultivators	16	4	12
Marginal workers: Agricultural labourers	4	1	3
Marginal workers: Household industry workers	0	0	0
Marginal workers: Others	0	0	0
Non-workers	163	70	93
