= Babachiya =

- village
- Location within Madhya Pradesh Location within India
- Coordinates: 23.697037°N 77.606073°E
- Country: India
- State: Madhya Pradesh
- District: Bhopal
- Tehsil: Berasia

Population (2011)
  - Total: 2,255
- Time zone: UTC+5:30 (IST)
- ISO 3166 code: MP-IN
- Census code: 482173

Babachiya is a village in the Bhopal district of Madhya Pradesh, India. It is located in the Berasia tehsil.

== Demographics ==
According to the 2011 census of India, Babachiya has 470 households. The effective literacy rate (i.e. the literacy rate of population excluding children aged 6 and below) is 69.35%.

Demographics (2011 Census)
| | Total | Male | Female |
|---|---|---|---|
| Population | 2255 | 1208 | 1047 |
| Children aged below 6 years | 327 | 168 | 159 |
| Scheduled caste | 586 | 320 | 266 |
| Scheduled tribe | 10 | 5 | 5 |
| Literates | 1337 | 819 | 518 |
| Workers (all) | 981 | 637 | 344 |
| Main workers (total) | 696 | 488 | 208 |
| Main workers: Cultivators | 192 | 168 | 24 |
| Main workers: Agricultural labourers | 461 | 279 | 182 |
| Main workers: Household industry workers | 5 | 5 | 0 |
| Main workers: Other | 38 | 36 | 2 |
| Marginal workers (total) | 285 | 149 | 136 |
| Marginal workers: Cultivators | 26 | 13 | 13 |
| Marginal workers: Agricultural labourers | 234 | 120 | 114 |
| Marginal workers: Household industry workers | 4 | 2 | 2 |
| Marginal workers: Others | 21 | 14 | 7 |
| Non-workers | 1274 | 571 | 703 |
