= Tarawli Khurd =

- village
- Location within Madhya Pradesh Location within India
- Coordinates: 23.738121°N 77.449316°E
- Country: India
- State: Madhya Pradesh
- District: Bhopal
- Tehsil: Berasia

Population (2011)
  - Total: 588
- Time zone: UTC+5:30 (IST)
- ISO 3166 code: MP-IN
- Census code: 482152

Tarawli Khurd is a village in the Bhopal district of Madhya Pradesh, India. It is located in the Berasia tehsil.

== Demographics ==
According to the 2011 census of India, Tarawli Khurd has 135 households. The effective literacy rate (i.e. the literacy rate of population excluding children aged 6 and below) is 56.67%.

Demographics (2011 Census)
| | Total | Male | Female |
|---|---|---|---|
| Population | 588 | 317 | 271 |
| Children aged below 6 years | 101 | 54 | 47 |
| Scheduled caste | 59 | 34 | 25 |
| Scheduled tribe | 28 | 10 | 18 |
| Literates | 276 | 177 | 99 |
| Workers (all) | 172 | 168 | 4 |
| Main workers (total) | 123 | 121 | 2 |
| Main workers: Cultivators | 110 | 109 | 1 |
| Main workers: Agricultural labourers | 5 | 5 | 0 |
| Main workers: Household industry workers | 0 | 0 | 0 |
| Main workers: Other | 8 | 7 | 1 |
| Marginal workers (total) | 49 | 47 | 2 |
| Marginal workers: Cultivators | 5 | 4 | 1 |
| Marginal workers: Agricultural labourers | 39 | 38 | 1 |
| Marginal workers: Household industry workers | 0 | 0 | 0 |
| Marginal workers: Others | 5 | 5 | 0 |
| Non-workers | 416 | 149 | 267 |
