= Bamhori, Bhopal =

Bamhori
- village
- Location within Madhya Pradesh Location within India
- Coordinates: 23.7165612°N 77.3180836°E
- Country: India
- State: Madhya Pradesh
- District: Bhopal
- Tehsil: Berasia
- Elevation: 486 m (1,594 ft)

Population (2011)
  - Total: 159
- Time zone: UTC+5:30 (IST)
- ISO 3166 code: MP-IN
- 2011 census code: 482339

Bamhori is a village in the Bhopal district of Madhya Pradesh, India. It is located in the Berasia tehsil.

== Demographics ==
According to the 2011 census of India, Bamhori has 30 households. The effective literacy rate (i.e. the literacy rate of population excluding children aged 6 and below) is 63.24%.

Demographics (2011 Census)
	Total	Male	Female
Population	159	89	70
Children aged below 6 years	23	14	9
Scheduled caste	0	0	0
Scheduled tribe	0	0	0
Literates	86	51	35
Workers (all)	98	56	42
Main workers (total)	38	31	7
Main workers: Cultivators	36	30	6
Main workers: Agricultural labourers	2	1	1
Main workers: Household industry workers	0	0	0
Main workers: Other	0	0	0
Marginal workers (total)	60	25	35
Marginal workers: Cultivators	25	4	21
Marginal workers: Agricultural labourers	33	19	14
Marginal workers: Household industry workers	0	0	0
Marginal workers: Others	2	2	0
Non-workers	61	33	28
