= Kandi Khedi =

- village
- Location within Madhya Pradesh Location within India
- Coordinates: 23.753491°N 77.411751°E
- Country: India
- State: Madhya Pradesh
- District: Bhopal
- Tehsil: Berasia

Population (2011)
  - Total: 367
- Time zone: UTC+5:30 (IST)
- ISO 3166 code: MP-IN
- Census code: 482138

Kandi Khedi is a village in the Bhopal district of Madhya Pradesh, India. It is located in the Berasia tehsil.

== Demographics ==
According to the 2011 census of India, Kandi Khedi has 73 households. The effective literacy rate (i.e. the literacy rate of population excluding children aged 6 and below) is 69.39%.

Demographics (2011 Census)
| | Total | Male | Female |
|---|---|---|---|
| Population | 367 | 203 | 164 |
| Children aged below 6 years | 37 | 21 | 16 |
| Scheduled caste | 36 | 22 | 14 |
| Scheduled tribe | 0 | 0 | 0 |
| Literates | 229 | 162 | 67 |
| Workers (all) | 93 | 91 | 2 |
| Main workers (total) | 63 | 61 | 2 |
| Main workers: Cultivators | 58 | 57 | 1 |
| Main workers: Agricultural labourers | 1 | 0 | 1 |
| Main workers: Household industry workers | 0 | 0 | 0 |
| Main workers: Other | 4 | 4 | 0 |
| Marginal workers (total) | 30 | 30 | 0 |
| Marginal workers: Cultivators | 0 | 0 | 0 |
| Marginal workers: Agricultural labourers | 25 | 25 | 0 |
| Marginal workers: Household industry workers | 4 | 4 | 0 |
| Marginal workers: Others | 1 | 1 | 0 |
| Non-workers | 274 | 112 | 162 |
