= Karhaiya Shah =

- village
- Location within Madhya Pradesh Location within India
- Coordinates: 23.720570°N 77.428041°E
- Country: India
- State: Madhya Pradesh
- District: Bhopal
- Tehsil: Berasia

Population (2011)
  - Total: 1,457
- Time zone: UTC+5:30 (IST)
- ISO 3166 code: MP-IN
- Census code: 482205

Karhaiya Shah is a village in the Bhopal district of Madhya Pradesh, India. It is located in the Berasia tehsil.

== Demographics ==
According to the 2011 census of India, Karhaiya Shah has 281 households. The effective literacy rate (i.e. the literacy rate of population excluding children aged 6 and below) is 59.51%.

Demographics (2011 Census)
	Total	Male	Female
Population	1457	788	669
Children aged below 6 years	227	118	109
Scheduled caste	80	46	34
Scheduled tribe	63	34	29
Literates	732	463	269
Workers (all)	758	424	334
Main workers (total)	412	299	113
Main workers: Cultivators	243	205	38
Main workers: Agricultural labourers	158	86	72
Main workers: Household industry workers	1	1	0
Main workers: Other	10	7	3
Marginal workers (total)	346	125	221
Marginal workers: Cultivators	18	7	11
Marginal workers: Agricultural labourers	322	118	204
Marginal workers: Household industry workers	5	0	5
Marginal workers: Others	1	0	1
Non-workers	699	364	335
