= Barkheda Moji =

- village
- Location within Madhya Pradesh Location within India
- Coordinates: 23.654166°N 77.424656°E
- Country: India
- State: Madhya Pradesh
- District: Bhopal
- Tehsil: Berasia

Population (2011)
  - Total: 325
- Time zone: UTC+5:30 (IST)
- ISO 3166 code: MP-IN
- Census code: 482204

Barkheda Moji is a village in the Bhopal district of Madhya Pradesh, India. It is located in the Berasia tehsil.

== Demographics ==
According to the 2011 census of India, Barkheda Moji has 63 households. The effective literacy rate (i.e. the literacy rate of population excluding children aged 6 and below) is 62.13%.

Demographics (2011 Census)
| | Total | Male | Female |
|---|---|---|---|
| Population | 325 | 157 | 168 |
| Children aged below 6 years | 53 | 27 | 26 |
| Scheduled caste | 43 | 19 | 24 |
| Scheduled tribe | 0 | 0 | 0 |
| Literates | 169 | 82 | 87 |
| Workers (all) | 78 | 68 | 10 |
| Main workers (total) | 65 | 61 | 4 |
| Main workers: Cultivators | 37 | 37 | 0 |
| Main workers: Agricultural labourers | 24 | 22 | 2 |
| Main workers: Household industry workers | 0 | 0 | 0 |
| Main workers: Other | 4 | 2 | 2 |
| Marginal workers (total) | 13 | 7 | 6 |
| Marginal workers: Cultivators | 0 | 0 | 0 |
| Marginal workers: Agricultural labourers | 2 | 2 | 0 |
| Marginal workers: Household industry workers | 0 | 0 | 0 |
| Marginal workers: Others | 11 | 5 | 6 |
| Non-workers | 247 | 89 | 158 |
