= Nidanpur, Berasia =

Nidanpur
- village
- Location within Madhya Pradesh Location within India
- Coordinates: 23.6764179°N 77.3984704°E
- Country: India
- State: Madhya Pradesh
- District: Bhopal
- Tehsil: Berasia
- Elevation: 471 m (1,545 ft)

Population (2011)
  - Total: 505
- Time zone: UTC+5:30 (IST)
- ISO 3166 code: MP-IN
- 2011 census code: 482221

Nidanpur is a village in the Bhopal district of Madhya Pradesh, India. It is located in the Berasia tehsil.

== Demographics ==
According to the 2011 census of India, Nidanpur has 86 households. The effective literacy rate (i.e. the literacy rate of population excluding children aged 6 and below) is 71.19%.

Demographics (2011 Census)
	Total	Male	Female
Population	505	260	245
Children aged below 6 years	78	41	37
Scheduled caste	14	7	7
Scheduled tribe	0	0	0
Literates	304	188	116
Workers (all)	172	129	43
Main workers (total)	157	127	30
Main workers: Cultivators	125	106	19
Main workers: Agricultural labourers	15	11	4
Main workers: Household industry workers	9	5	4
Main workers: Other	8	5	3
Marginal workers (total)	15	2	13
Marginal workers: Cultivators	10	1	9
Marginal workers: Agricultural labourers	5	1	4
Marginal workers: Household industry workers	0	0	0
Marginal workers: Others	0	0	0
Non-workers	333	131	202
