= Pipaliya Junnardar =

- village
- Location within Madhya Pradesh Location within India
- Coordinates: 23.4426641°N 77.4730653°E
- Country: India
- State: Madhya Pradesh
- District: Bhopal
- Tehsil: Berasia
- Elevation: 460 m (1,510 ft)

Population (2011)
  - Total: 218
- Time zone: UTC+5:30 (IST)
- ISO 3166 code: MP-IN
- 2011 census code: 482325

Pipaliya Junnardar is a village in the Bhopal district of Madhya Pradesh, India. It is located in the Berasia tehsil.

== Demographics ==
According to the 2011 census of India, Pipaliya Junnardar has 41 households. The effective literacy rate (i.e. the literacy rate of population excluding children aged 6 and below) is 79.78%.

Demographics (2011 Census)
	Total	Male	Female
Population	218	117	101
Children aged below 6 years	35	22	13
Scheduled caste	0	0	0
Scheduled tribe	9	6	3
Literates	146	85	61
Workers (all)	133	70	63
Main workers (total)	113	59	54
Main workers: Cultivators	34	24	10
Main workers: Agricultural labourers	35	15	20
Main workers: Household industry workers	35	14	21
Main workers: Other	9	6	3
Marginal workers (total)	20	11	9
Marginal workers: Cultivators	2	2	0
Marginal workers: Agricultural labourers	6	2	4
Marginal workers: Household industry workers	6	2	4
Marginal workers: Others	6	5	1
Non-workers	85	47	38
