= Ijagiri =

Ijagiri Iggiri
- village
- Location within Madhya Pradesh Location within India
- Coordinates: 23.50685767°N 77.35486507°E
- Country: India
- State: Madhya Pradesh
- District: Bhopal
- Tehsil: Berasia
- Elevation: 491 m (1,611 ft)

Population (2011)
  - Total: 1,338
- Time zone: UTC+5:30 (IST)
- PIN: 462101
- ISO 3166 code: MP-IN
- 2011 census code: 482286

Ijagiri is a village in the Bhopal district of Madhya Pradesh, India. It is located in the Berasia tehsil.

== Demographics ==
According to the 2011 census of India, Ijagiri has 262 households. The effective literacy rate (i.e. the literacy rate of population excluding children aged 6 and below) is 80.25%.

Demographics (2011 Census)
	Total	Male	Female
Population	1338	721	617
Children aged below 6 years	229	142	87
Scheduled caste	506	269	237
Scheduled tribe	44	27	17
Literates	890	515	375
Workers (all)	661	340	321
Main workers (total)	334	218	116
Main workers: Cultivators	150	93	57
Main workers: Agricultural labourers	153	97	56
Main workers: Household industry workers	1	1	0
Main workers: Other	30	27	3
Marginal workers (total)	327	122	205
Marginal workers: Cultivators	64	17	47
Marginal workers: Agricultural labourers	254	100	154
Marginal workers: Household industry workers	6	3	3
Marginal workers: Others	3	2	1
Non-workers	677	381	296
