= Keshokhedi =

- village
- Location within Madhya Pradesh Location within India
- Coordinates: 23.5154596°N 77.4329048°E
- Country: India
- State: Madhya Pradesh
- District: Bhopal
- Tehsil: Berasia
- Elevation: 470 m (1,540 ft)

Population (2011)
  - Total: 614
- Time zone: UTC+5:30 (IST)
- ISO 3166 code: MP-IN
- 2011 census code: 482311

Keshokhedi is a village in the Bhopal district of Madhya Pradesh, India. It is located in the Berasia tehsil.

== Demographics ==
According to the 2011 census of India, Keshokhedi has 125 households. The effective literacy rate (i.e. the literacy rate of population excluding children aged 6 and below) is 70.13%.

Demographics (2011 Census)
	Total	Male	Female
Population	614	323	291
Children aged below 6 years	85	41	44
Scheduled caste	132	76	56
Scheduled tribe	0	0	0
Literates	371	231	140
Workers (all)	185	114	71
Main workers (total)	129	110	19
Main workers: Cultivators	53	52	1
Main workers: Agricultural labourers	74	57	17
Main workers: Household industry workers	0	0	0
Main workers: Other	2	1	1
Marginal workers (total)	56	4	52
Marginal workers: Cultivators	9	2	7
Marginal workers: Agricultural labourers	47	2	45
Marginal workers: Household industry workers	0	0	0
Marginal workers: Others	0	0	0
Non-workers	429	209	220
