= Tinoniya =

- village
- Location within Madhya Pradesh Location within India
- Coordinates: 23.770120°N 77.444100°E
- Country: India
- State: Madhya Pradesh
- District: Bhopal
- Tehsil: Berasia

Population (2011)
  - Total: 95
- Time zone: UTC+5:30 (IST)
- ISO 3166 code: MP-IN
- Census code: 482148

Tinoniya is a village in the Bhopal district of Madhya Pradesh, India. It is located in the Berasia tehsil.

== Demographics ==
According to the 2011 census of India, Tinoniya has 21 households. The effective literacy rate (i.e. the literacy rate of population excluding children aged 6 and below) is 35.53%.

Demographics (2011 Census)
| | Total | Male | Female |
|---|---|---|---|
| Population | 95 | 50 | 45 |
| Children aged below 6 years | 19 | 9 | 10 |
| Scheduled caste | 34 | 17 | 17 |
| Scheduled tribe | 0 | 0 | 0 |
| Literates | 27 | 15 | 12 |
| Workers (all) | 45 | 26 | 19 |
| Main workers (total) | 45 | 26 | 19 |
| Main workers: Cultivators | 16 | 10 | 6 |
| Main workers: Agricultural labourers | 29 | 16 | 13 |
| Main workers: Household industry workers | 0 | 0 | 0 |
| Main workers: Other | 0 | 0 | 0 |
| Marginal workers (total) | 0 | 0 | 0 |
| Marginal workers: Cultivators | 0 | 0 | 0 |
| Marginal workers: Agricultural labourers | 0 | 0 | 0 |
| Marginal workers: Household industry workers | 0 | 0 | 0 |
| Marginal workers: Others | 0 | 0 | 0 |
| Non-workers | 50 | 24 | 26 |
