= Semri Khurd =

- village
- Location within Madhya Pradesh Location within India
- Coordinates: 23.676688°N 77.494145°E
- Country: India
- State: Madhya Pradesh
- District: Bhopal
- Tehsil: Berasia

Population (2011)
  - Total: 589
- Time zone: UTC+5:30 (IST)
- ISO 3166 code: MP-IN
- Census code: 482190

Semri Khurd is a village in the Bhopal district of Madhya Pradesh, India. It is located in the Berasia tehsil.

== Demographics ==
According to the 2011 census of India, Semri Khurd has 126 households. The effective literacy rate, i.e., the literacy rate of population excluding children aged 6 and below, is 72.65%.

Demographics (2011 Census)
	Total	Male	Female
Population	589	303	286
Children aged below 6 years	99	55	44
Scheduled caste	119	60	59
Scheduled tribe	0	0	0
Literates	356	213	143
Workers (all)	215	151	64
Main workers (total)	138	115	23
Main workers: Cultivators	112	95	17
Main workers: Agricultural labourers	16	11	5
Main workers: Household industry workers	4	4	0
Main workers: Other	6	5	1
Marginal workers (total)	77	36	41
Marginal workers: Cultivators	7	5	2
Marginal workers: Agricultural labourers	66	28	38
Marginal workers: Household industry workers	0	0	0
Marginal workers: Others	4	3	1
Non-workers	374	152	222
