= Jhironiya Kankad =

- village
- Location within Madhya Pradesh Location within India
- Coordinates: 23.5951942°N 77.335314°E
- Country: India
- State: Madhya Pradesh
- District: Bhopal
- Tehsil: Berasia
- Elevation: 496 m (1,627 ft)

Population (2011)
  - Total: 976
- Time zone: UTC+5:30 (IST)
- ISO 3166 code: MP-IN
- 2011 census code: 482236

Jhironiya Kankad is a village in the Bhopal district of Madhya Pradesh, India. It is located in the Berasia tehsil.

== Demographics ==
According to the 2011 census of India, Jhironiya Kankad has 228 households. The effective literacy rate (i.e. the literacy rate of population excluding children aged 6 and below) is 54.88%.

Demographics (2011 Census)
	Total	Male	Female
Population	976	529	447
Children aged below 6 years	167	102	65
Scheduled caste	125	71	54
Scheduled tribe	7	4	3
Literates	444	318	126
Workers (all)	366	240	126
Main workers (total)	345	230	115
Main workers: Cultivators	291	200	91
Main workers: Agricultural labourers	51	28	23
Main workers: Household industry workers	0	0	0
Main workers: Other	3	2	1
Marginal workers (total)	21	10	11
Marginal workers: Cultivators	15	8	7
Marginal workers: Agricultural labourers	4	1	3
Marginal workers: Household industry workers	0	0	0
Marginal workers: Others	2	1	1
Non-workers	610	289	321
