= Chandan Khedi =

- village
- Location within Madhya Pradesh Location within India
- Coordinates: 23.661853°N 77.581210°E
- Country: India
- State: Madhya Pradesh
- District: Bhopal
- Tehsil: Berasia

Population (2011)
  - Total: 263
- Time zone: UTC+5:30 (IST)
- ISO 3166 code: MP-IN
- Census code: 482177

Chandan Khedi (Hindi: चंदन खेड़िक) is a village in the Bhopal district of Madhya Pradesh, India. It is located in the Berasia tehsil.

== Demographics ==
According to the 2011 census of India, Chandan Khedi has 41 households. The effective literacy rate (i.e. the literacy rate of population excluding children aged 6 and below) is 64.36%.

Demographics (2011 Census)
	Total	Male	Female
Population	263	136	127
Children aged below 6 years	61	36	25
Scheduled caste	84	46	38
Scheduled tribe	0	0	0
Literates	130	66	64
Workers (all)	117	63	54
Main workers (total)	114	61	53
Main workers: Cultivators	12	9	3
Main workers: Agricultural labourers	100	50	50
Main workers: Household industry workers	1	1	0
Main workers: Other	1	1	0
Marginal workers (total)	3	2	1
Marginal workers: Cultivators	0	0	0
Marginal workers: Agricultural labourers	2	1	1
Marginal workers: Household industry workers	0	0	0
Marginal workers: Others	1	1	0
Non-workers	146	73	73
