= Darwaji =

- village
- Location within Madhya Pradesh Location within India
- Coordinates: 23.5543008°N 77.4788014°E
- Country: India
- State: Madhya Pradesh
- District: Bhopal
- Tehsil: Berasia
- Elevation: 467 m (1,532 ft)

Population (2011)
  - Total: 329
- Time zone: UTC+5:30 (IST)
- ISO 3166 code: MP-IN
- 2011 census code: 482270

Darwaji is a village in the Bhopal district of Madhya Pradesh, India. It is located in the Berasia tehsil.

== Demographics ==
According to the 2011 census of India, Darwaji has 70 households. The effective literacy rate (i.e. the literacy rate of population excluding children aged 6 and below) is 75.81%.

Demographics (2011 Census)
| | Total | Male | Female |
|---|---|---|---|
| Population | 329 | 182 | 147 |
| Children aged below 6 years | 52 | 23 | 29 |
| Scheduled caste | 56 | 27 | 29 |
| Scheduled tribe | 0 | 0 | 0 |
| Literates | 210 | 144 | 66 |
| Workers (all) | 167 | 91 | 76 |
| Main workers (total) | 153 | 87 | 66 |
| Main workers: Cultivators | 100 | 54 | 46 |
| Main workers: Agricultural labourers | 47 | 29 | 18 |
| Main workers: Household industry workers | 0 | 0 | 0 |
| Main workers: Other | 6 | 4 | 2 |
| Marginal workers (total) | 14 | 4 | 10 |
| Marginal workers: Cultivators | 4 | 2 | 2 |
| Marginal workers: Agricultural labourers | 10 | 2 | 8 |
| Marginal workers: Household industry workers | 0 | 0 | 0 |
| Marginal workers: Others | 0 | 0 | 0 |
| Non-workers | 162 | 91 | 71 |
