= Rampura Balachon =

- village
- Location within Madhya Pradesh Location within India
- Coordinates: 23.5865022°N 77.3008506°E
- Country: India
- State: Madhya Pradesh
- District: Bhopal
- Tehsil: Berasia
- Elevation: 507 m (1,663 ft)

Population (2011)
  - Total: 2,118
- Time zone: UTC+5:30 (IST)
- ISO 3166 code: MP-IN
- 2011 census code: 482239

Rampura Balachon is a village in the Bhopal district of Madhya Pradesh, India. It is located in the Berasia tehsil.

== Demographics ==
According to the 2011 census of India, Rampura Balachon has 464 households. The effective literacy rate (i.e. the literacy rate of population excluding children aged 6 and below) is 66.27%.

Demographics (2011 Census)
	Total	Male	Female
Population	2118	1130	988
Children aged below 6 years	354	192	162
Scheduled caste	314	161	153
Scheduled tribe	194	102	92
Literates	1169	751	418
Workers (all)	651	530	121
Main workers (total)	641	525	116
Main workers: Cultivators	292	259	33
Main workers: Agricultural labourers	304	228	76
Main workers: Household industry workers	7	4	3
Main workers: Other	38	34	4
Marginal workers (total)	10	5	5
Marginal workers: Cultivators	1	1	0
Marginal workers: Agricultural labourers	6	2	4
Marginal workers: Household industry workers	0	0	0
Marginal workers: Others	3	2	1
Non-workers	1467	600	867
