= Khejra Padhar =

- village
- Location within Madhya Pradesh Location within India
- Coordinates: 23.737276°N 77.553783°E
- Country: India
- State: Madhya Pradesh
- District: Bhopal
- Tehsil: Berasia

Population (2011)
  - Total: 498
- Time zone: UTC+5:30 (IST)
- ISO 3166 code: MP-IN
- Census code: 482162

Khejra Padhar is a village in the Bhopal district of Madhya Pradesh, India. It is located in the Berasia tehsil.

== Demographics ==
According to the 2011 census of India, Khejra Padhar has 114 households. The effective literacy rate (i.e. the literacy rate of population excluding children aged 6 and below) is 73.71%.

Demographics (2011 Census)
	Total	Male	Female
Population	498	271	227
Children aged below 6 years	72	40	32
Scheduled caste	240	130	110
Scheduled tribe	0	0	0
Literates	314	195	119
Workers (all)	218	150	68
Main workers (total)	93	87	6
Main workers: Cultivators	45	44	1
Main workers: Agricultural labourers	46	41	5
Main workers: Household industry workers	0	0	0
Main workers: Other	2	2	0
Marginal workers (total)	125	63	62
Marginal workers: Cultivators	17	12	5
Marginal workers: Agricultural labourers	107	50	57
Marginal workers: Household industry workers	0	0	0
Marginal workers: Others	1	1	0
Non-workers	280	121	159
