= Khuja Khedi =

- village
- Location within Madhya Pradesh Location within India
- Coordinates: 23.5599713°N 77.4945741°E
- Country: India
- State: Madhya Pradesh
- District: Bhopal
- Tehsil: Berasia
- Elevation: 470 m (1,540 ft)

Population (2011)
  - Total: 268
- Time zone: UTC+5:30 (IST)
- ISO 3166 code: MP-IN
- 2011 census code: 482271

Khuja Khedi is a village in the Bhopal district of Madhya Pradesh, India. It is located in the Berasia tehsil.

== Demographics ==
According to the 2011 census of India, Khuja Khedi has 56 households. The effective literacy rate (i.e. the literacy rate of population excluding children aged 6 and below) is 72.27%.

Demographics (2011 Census)
	Total	Male	Female
Population	268	133	135
Children aged below 6 years	30	15	15
Scheduled caste	63	32	31
Scheduled tribe	0	0	0
Literates	172	104	68
Workers (all)	134	69	65
Main workers (total)	126	66	60
Main workers: Cultivators	69	35	34
Main workers: Agricultural labourers	55	30	25
Main workers: Household industry workers	0	0	0
Main workers: Other	2	1	1
Marginal workers (total)	8	3	5
Marginal workers: Cultivators	3	1	2
Marginal workers: Agricultural labourers	5	2	3
Marginal workers: Household industry workers	0	0	0
Marginal workers: Others	0	0	0
Non-workers	134	64	70
