= Chhapryai =

- village
- Location within Madhya Pradesh Location within India
- Coordinates: 23.651812°N 77.572914°E
- Country: India
- State: Madhya Pradesh
- District: Bhopal
- Tehsil: Berasia

Population (2011)
  - Total: 525
- Time zone: UTC+5:30 (IST)
- ISO 3166 code: MP-IN
- Census code: 482178

Chhapryai is a village in the Bhopal district of Madhya Pradesh, India. It is located in the Berasia tehsil.

== Demographics ==
According to the 2011 census of India, Chhapryai has 110 households. The effective literacy rate (i.e. the literacy rate of population excluding children aged 6 and below) is 69.18%.

Demographics (2011 Census)
| | Total | Male | Female |
|---|---|---|---|
| Population | 525 | 270 | 255 |
| Children aged below 6 years | 61 | 29 | 32 |
| Scheduled caste | 93 | 41 | 52 |
| Scheduled tribe | 0 | 0 | 0 |
| Literates | 321 | 196 | 125 |
| Workers (all) | 160 | 122 | 38 |
| Main workers (total) | 145 | 118 | 27 |
| Main workers: Cultivators | 61 | 55 | 6 |
| Main workers: Agricultural labourers | 77 | 57 | 20 |
| Main workers: Household industry workers | 1 | 0 | 1 |
| Main workers: Other | 6 | 6 | 0 |
| Marginal workers (total) | 15 | 4 | 11 |
| Marginal workers: Cultivators | 2 | 0 | 2 |
| Marginal workers: Agricultural labourers | 12 | 4 | 8 |
| Marginal workers: Household industry workers | 0 | 0 | 0 |
| Marginal workers: Others | 1 | 0 | 1 |
| Non-workers | 365 | 148 | 217 |
