= Berasia =

Town in Madhya Pradesh, India

- Town
- Location in Madhya Pradesh, India Berasia (India)
- Coordinates: 23.63°N 77.43°E
- Country: India
- State: Madhya Pradesh
- District: Bhopal
- Elevation: 484 m (1,588 ft)

Population (2001)
  - Total: 24,289

Languages
  - Official: Hindi
- Time zone: UTC+5:30 (IST)
- PIN: 463106
- ISO 3166 code: IN-MP
- Vehicle registration: MP

Berasia is a town and a nagar palika (municipality) in Bhopal district in the state of Madhya Pradesh, India.

== History ==
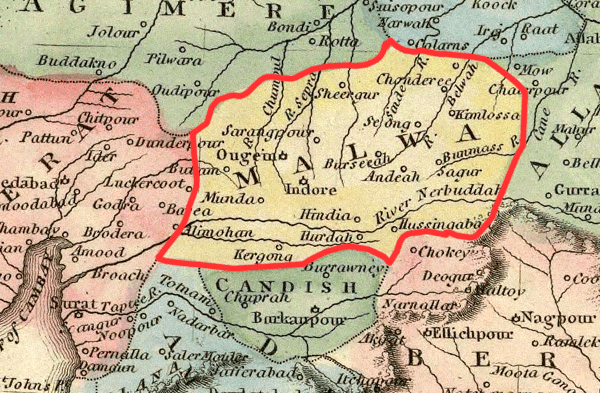
An 1823 map of Central India. Berasia is depicted as "Burseeah" in the Malwa province

In the early 18th century, Berasia was a small mustajiri (rented estate) under the authority of the Delhi-based Mughal fief-holder Taj Mohammad Khan. It suffered from anarchy and lawlessness due to regular attacks from highwaymen and plunderers. Dost Mohammad Khan, a Mughal soldier-turned-mercenary of Afghan descent, took on the lease of Berasia for an annual payment of 30,000 rupees. He later annexed several neighboring territories and established the Bhopal State.

Later, the district was annexed by the Dhar State, but in 1860 it was returned to Bhopal as a reward for services in the Indian Rebellion of 1857.

== Geography ==
Berasia is located at 23.63°N 77.43°E. It has an average elevation of 484 metres (1,587 feet).

== Demographics ==
As of 2001 India census, Berasia had a population of 24,289. Males constitute 53% of the population and females 47%. Berasia has an average literacy rate of 57%, lower than the national average of 59.5%; with 60% of the males and 40% of females literate. 18% of the population is under 6 years of age.
