= Khejra Ghat =

Khejra Ghat may refer to:

- Khejra Ghat (census code 482058), a village near Nazirabad in Madhya Pradesh, India
- Khejra Ghat (census code 482172), a village near Arjunkhedi in Madhya Pradesh, India
