= Nazirabad =

Nazirabad may refer to:

- Nazirabad, Bhopal, a village in Madhya Pradesh, India
- Nazirabad railway station, Pakistan
