= Khejra Ghat (census code 482058) =

- village
- Location within Madhya Pradesh Location within India
- Coordinates: 23.810966°N 77.260007°E
- Country: India
- State: Madhya Pradesh
- District: Bhopal
- Tehsil: Berasia

Population (2011)
  - Total: 708
- Time zone: UTC+5:30 (IST)
- ISO 3166 code: MP-IN
- Census code: 482058

Khejra Ghat is a village in the Bhopal district of Madhya Pradesh, India. It is located in the Berasia tehsil.

It is located close to the Guna-Bhopal road, near Nazirabad and Khejra Kalyanpur.

== Demographics ==
According to the 2011 census of India, Khejra Ghat has 165 households. The effective literacy rate (i.e. the literacy rate of population excluding children aged 6 and below) is 57.36%.

Demographics (2011 Census)
	Total	Male	Female
Population	708	353	355
Children aged below 6 years	117	55	62
Scheduled caste	122	64	58
Scheduled tribe	4	3	1
Literates	339	213	126
Workers (all)	380	182	198
Main workers (total)	372	177	195
Main workers: Cultivators	321	149	172
Main workers: Agricultural labourers	47	25	22
Main workers: Household industry workers	0	0	0
Main workers: Other	4	3	1
Marginal workers (total)	8	5	3
Marginal workers: Cultivators	2	1	1
Marginal workers: Agricultural labourers	3	2	1
Marginal workers: Household industry workers	0	0	0
Marginal workers: Others	3	2	1
Non-workers	328	171	157
