= Khejra Ghat (census code 482172) =

- village
- Location within Madhya Pradesh Location within India
- Coordinates: 23.721044°N 77.609405°E
- Country: India
- State: Madhya Pradesh
- District: Bhopal
- Tehsil: Berasia

Population (2011)
  - Total: 540
- Time zone: UTC+5:30 (IST)
- ISO 3166 code: MP-IN
- Census code: 482172

Khejra Ghat is a village in the Bhopal district of Madhya Pradesh, India. It is located in the Berasia tehsil, near Arjunkhedi.

== Demographics ==
According to the 2011 census of India, Khejra Ghat has 114 households. The effective literacy rate (i.e. the literacy rate of population excluding children aged 6 and below) is 57.21%.

Demographics (2011 Census)
	Total	Male	Female
Population	540	274	266
Children aged below 6 years	82	37	45
Scheduled caste	7	4	3
Scheduled tribe	0	0	0
Literates	262	147	115
Workers (all)	234	123	111
Main workers (total)	114	103	11
Main workers: Cultivators	32	32	0
Main workers: Agricultural labourers	80	70	10
Main workers: Household industry workers	0	0	0
Main workers: Other	2	1	1
Marginal workers (total)	120	20	100
Marginal workers: Cultivators	1	0	1
Marginal workers: Agricultural labourers	118	20	98
Marginal workers: Household industry workers	0	0	0
Marginal workers: Others	1	0	1
Non-workers	306	151	155
