= Arjunkhedi =

- village
- Location within Madhya Pradesh Location within India
- Coordinates: 23.729492°N 77.595586°E
- Country: India
- State: Madhya Pradesh
- District: Bhopal
- Tehsil: Berasia

Population (2011)
  - Total: 964
- Time zone: UTC+5:30 (IST)
- ISO 3166 code: MP-IN
- Census code: 482171

Arjunkhedi is a village in the Bhopal district of Madhya Pradesh, India. It is located in the Berasia tehsil.

== Demographics ==
According to the 2011 census of India, Arjunkhedi has 215 households. The effective literacy rate (i.e. the literacy rate of population excluding children aged 6 and below) is 74.18%.

Demographics (2011 Census)
	Total	Male	Female
Population	964	507	457
Children aged below 6 years	170	103	67
Scheduled caste	133	76	57
Scheduled tribe	19	14	5
Literates	589	340	249
Workers (all)	449	230	219
Main workers (total)	235	196	39
Main workers: Cultivators	77	72	5
Main workers: Agricultural labourers	154	123	31
Main workers: Household industry workers	0	0	0
Main workers: Other	4	1	3
Marginal workers (total)	214	34	180
Marginal workers: Cultivators	7	4	3
Marginal workers: Agricultural labourers	206	29	177
Marginal workers: Household industry workers	1	1	0
Marginal workers: Others	0	0	0
Non-workers	515	277	238
