= Khejra Kalyanpur =

- village
- Location within Madhya Pradesh Location within India
- Coordinates: 23.825375°N 77.267259°E
- Country: India
- State: Madhya Pradesh
- District: Bhopal
- Tehsil: Berasia

Population (2011)
  - Total: 793
- Time zone: UTC+5:30 (IST)
- ISO 3166 code: MP-IN
- Census code: 482057

Khejra Kalyanpur is a village in the Bhopal district of Madhya Pradesh, India. It is located in the Berasia tehsil.

== Demographics ==
According to the 2011 census of India, Khejra Kalyanpur has 167 households. The effective literacy rate (i.e. the literacy rate of population excluding children aged 6 and below) is 50.38%.

Demographics (2011 Census)
	Total	Male	Female
Population	793	430	363
Children aged below 6 years	128	71	57
Scheduled caste	207	111	96
Scheduled tribe	2	2	0
Literates	335	217	118
Workers (all)	271	233	38
Main workers (total)	143	133	10
Main workers: Cultivators	93	90	3
Main workers: Agricultural labourers	21	19	2
Main workers: Household industry workers	3	3	0
Main workers: Other	26	21	5
Marginal workers (total)	128	100	28
Marginal workers: Cultivators	2	2	0
Marginal workers: Agricultural labourers	121	94	27
Marginal workers: Household industry workers	0	0	0
Marginal workers: Others	5	4	1
Non-workers	522	197	325
