= Nazirabad, Bhopal =

Nazirabad
- village
- Location within Madhya Pradesh Location within India
- Coordinates: 23.799306°N 77.255231°E
- Country: India
- State: Madhya Pradesh
- District: Bhopal
- Tehsil: Berasia

Population (2011)
  - Total: 3,756
- Time zone: UTC+5:30 (IST)
- ISO 3166 code: IN-MP
- Census code: 482061

Nazirabad is a village in the Bhopal district of Madhya Pradesh, India. It is located in the Berasia tehsil.

== Demographics ==
According to the 2011 census of India, Nazirabad has 749 households. The effective literacy rate (i.e. the literacy rate of population excluding children aged 6 and below) is 67.5%.

Demographics (2011 Census)
	Total	Male	Female
Population	3756	1937	1819
Children aged below 6 years	636	318	318
Scheduled caste	1279	669	610
Scheduled tribe	46	25	21
Literates	2106	1245	861
Workers (all)	1217	880	337
Main workers (total)	916	687	229
Main workers: Cultivators	239	192	47
Main workers: Agricultural labourers	370	273	97
Main workers: Household industry workers	16	12	4
Main workers: Other	291	210	81
Marginal workers (total)	301	193	108
Marginal workers: Cultivators	13	7	6
Marginal workers: Agricultural labourers	233	153	80
Marginal workers: Household industry workers	7	4	3
Marginal workers: Others	48	29	19
Non-workers	2539	1057	1482
