= Sagoni Kalan =

Sagoni Kalan may refer to:

- Sagoni Kalan, Berasia, a village in Berasia tehsil of Bhopal district, Madhya Pradesh, India
- Sagoni Kalan, Huzur, a village in Huzur tehsil of Bhopal district, Madhya Pradesh, India
