= Sagoni Khurd =

- village
- Location within Madhya Pradesh Location within India
- Coordinates: 23.566002°N 77.4788014°E
- Country: India
- State: Madhya Pradesh
- District: Bhopal
- Tehsil: Berasia
- Elevation: 469 m (1,539 ft)

Population (2011)
  - Total: 2
- Time zone: UTC+5:30 (IST)
- ISO 3166 code: MP-IN
- 2011 census code: 482268

Sagoni Khurd is a village in the Bhopal district of Madhya Pradesh, India. It is located in the Berasia tehsil.

== Demographics ==
Most of the village's population now lives in Sagoni Kalan. According to the 2011 census of India, Sagoni Khurd has only 1 household. The effective literacy rate (i.e. the literacy rate of population excluding children aged 6 and below) is 50%.

Demographics (2011 Census)
	Total	Male	Female
Population	2	2	0
Children aged below 6 years	0	0	0
Scheduled caste	0	0	0
Scheduled tribe	0	0	0
Literates	1	1	0
Workers (all)	2	2	0
Main workers (total)	2	2	0
Main workers: Cultivators	0	0	0
Main workers: Agricultural labourers	0	0	0
Main workers: Household industry workers	2	2	0
Main workers: Other	0	0	0
Marginal workers (total)	0	0	0
Marginal workers: Cultivators	0	0	0
Marginal workers: Agricultural labourers	0	0	0
Marginal workers: Household industry workers	0	0	0
Marginal workers: Others	0	0	0
Non-workers	0	0	0
