= Sagoni Kalan, Huzur =

Sagoni Kalan
- village
- Location within Madhya Pradesh Location within India
- Coordinates: 23.24682715°N 77.53358603°E
- Country: India
- State: Madhya Pradesh
- District: Bhopal
- Tehsil: Huzur
- Elevation: 459 m (1,506 ft)

Population (2011)
  - Total: 409
- Time zone: UTC+5:30 (IST)
- ISO 3166 code: MP-IN
- 2011 census code: 482435

Sagoni Kalan is a village in the Bhopal district of Madhya Pradesh, India. It is located in the Huzur tehsil and the Phanda block.

== Demographics ==
According to the 2011 census of India, Sagoni Kalan has 87 households. The effective literacy rate (i.e. the literacy rate of population excluding children aged 6 and below) is 71.84%.

Demographics (2011 Census)
	Total	Male	Female
Population	409	223	186
Children aged below 6 years	61	33	28
Scheduled caste	82	44	38
Scheduled tribe	116	63	53
Literates	250	153	97
Workers (all)	167	123	44
Main workers (total)	142	112	30
Main workers: Cultivators	41	34	7
Main workers: Agricultural labourers	32	21	11
Main workers: Household industry workers	1	0	1
Main workers: Other	68	57	11
Marginal workers (total)	25	11	14
Marginal workers: Cultivators	2	2	0
Marginal workers: Agricultural labourers	2	2	0
Marginal workers: Household industry workers	1	0	1
Marginal workers: Others	20	7	13
Non-workers	242	100	142
