= Sagoni Kalan, Berasia =

Sagoni Kalan
- village
- Location within Madhya Pradesh Location within India
- Coordinates: 23.5641328°N 77.4558554°E
- Country: India
- State: Madhya Pradesh
- District: Bhopal
- Tehsil: Berasia
- Elevation: 473 m (1,552 ft)

Population (2011)
  - Total: 598
- Time zone: UTC+5:30 (IST)
- ISO 3166 code: MP-IN
- 2011 census code: 482267

Sagoni Kalan is a village in the Bhopal district of Madhya Pradesh, India. It is located in the Berasia tehsil.

== Demographics ==
According to the 2011 census of India, Sagoni Kalan has 109 households. The effective literacy rate (i.e. the literacy rate of population excluding children aged 6 and below) is 73.62%.

Demographics (2011 Census)
	Total	Male	Female
Population	598	315	283
Children aged below 6 years	90	49	41
Scheduled caste	308	163	145
Scheduled tribe	0	0	0
Literates	374	228	146
Workers (all)	323	166	157
Main workers (total)	283	159	124
Main workers: Cultivators	141	79	62
Main workers: Agricultural labourers	129	70	59
Main workers: Household industry workers	2	1	1
Main workers: Other	11	9	2
Marginal workers (total)	40	7	33
Marginal workers: Cultivators	22	3	19
Marginal workers: Agricultural labourers	18	4	14
Marginal workers: Household industry workers	0	0	0
Marginal workers: Others	0	0	0
Non-workers	275	149	126
