= Hinotiya Jagir =

Hinotiya Jagir may refer to:

- Hinotiya Jagir, Berasia, a village in Bhopal district of Madhya Pradesh, India
- Hinotiya Jagir, Huzur, a village in Bhopal district of Madhya Pradesh, India
