= Hinotiya Jagir, Huzur =

Hinotiya Jagir
- village
- Location within Madhya Pradesh Location within India
- Coordinates: 23.399403°N 77.389087°E
- Country: India
- State: Madhya Pradesh
- District: Bhopal
- Tehsil: Huzur

Population (2011)
  - Total: 495
- Time zone: UTC+5:30 (IST)
- ISO 3166 code: MP-IN
- Census code: 482398

Hinotiya Jagir is a village in the Bhopal district of Madhya Pradesh, India. It is located in the Huzur tehsil.

== Demographics ==
According to the 2011 census of India, Hinotiya Jagir has 114 households. The effective literacy rate (i.e. the literacy rate of population excluding children aged 6 and below) is 86.85%.

Demographics (2011 Census)
| | Total | Male | Female |
|---|---|---|---|
| Population | 495 | 265 | 230 |
| Children aged below 6 years | 69 | 32 | 37 |
| Scheduled caste | 229 | 120 | 109 |
| Scheduled tribe | 0 | 0 | 0 |
| Literates | 370 | 211 | 159 |
| Workers (all) | 251 | 142 | 109 |
| Main workers (total) | 172 | 107 | 65 |
| Main workers: Cultivators | 39 | 27 | 12 |
| Main workers: Agricultural labourers | 129 | 77 | 52 |
| Main workers: Household industry workers | 0 | 0 | 0 |
| Main workers: Other | 4 | 3 | 1 |
| Marginal workers (total) | 79 | 35 | 44 |
| Marginal workers: Cultivators | 2 | 1 | 1 |
| Marginal workers: Agricultural labourers | 72 | 33 | 39 |
| Marginal workers: Household industry workers | 3 | 0 | 3 |
| Marginal workers: Others | 2 | 1 | 1 |
| Non-workers | 244 | 123 | 121 |
