= Hinotiya Jagir, Berasia =

Hinotiya Jagir
- village
- Location within Madhya Pradesh Location within India
- Coordinates: 23.700839°N 77.307229°E
- Country: India
- State: Madhya Pradesh
- District: Bhopal
- Tehsil: Berasia

Population (2011)
  - Total: 578
- Time zone: UTC+5:30 (IST)
- ISO 3166 code: MP-IN
- Census code: 482122

Hinotiya Jagir is a village in the Bhopal district of Madhya Pradesh, India. It is located in the Berasia tehsil.

== Demographics ==
According to the 2011 census of India, Hinotiya Jagir has 123 households. The effective literacy rate (i.e. the literacy rate of population excluding children aged 6 and below) is 56.9%.

Demographics (2011 Census)
	Total	Male	Female
Population	578	293	285
Children aged below 6 years	114	53	61
Scheduled caste	77	36	41
Scheduled tribe	0	0	0
Literates	264	163	101
Workers (all)	295	180	115
Main workers (total)	89	75	14
Main workers: Cultivators	62	56	6
Main workers: Agricultural labourers	8	4	4
Main workers: Household industry workers	0	0	0
Main workers: Other	19	15	4
Marginal workers (total)	206	105	101
Marginal workers: Cultivators	35	7	28
Marginal workers: Agricultural labourers	159	88	71
Marginal workers: Household industry workers	1	1	0
Marginal workers: Others	11	9	2
Non-workers	283	113	170
