= Ganyari =

Ganyari may refer to:

- Ganyari, Berasia, a village in Bhopal district, India
- Ganyari, Huzur, a village in Bhopal district, India
