= Ganyari, Huzur =

Ganyari
- village
- Location within Madhya Pradesh Location within India
- Coordinates: 23.375878°N 77.464268°E
- Country: India
- State: Madhya Pradesh
- District: Bhopal
- Tehsil: Huzur
- Elevation: 485 m (1,591 ft)

Population (2011)
  - Total: 396
- Time zone: UTC+5:30 (IST)
- ISO 3166 code: MP-IN
- 2011 census code: 482417

Ganyari is a village in the Bhopal district of Madhya Pradesh, India. It is located in the Huzur tehsil and the Phanda block.

== Demographics ==
According to the 2011 census of India, Ganyari has 88 households. The effective literacy rate (i.e. the literacy rate of population excluding children aged 6 and below) is 74.03%.

Demographics (2011 Census)
	Total	Male	Female
Population	396	220	176
Children aged below 6 years	61	37	24
Scheduled caste	92	56	36
Scheduled tribe	10	6	4
Literates	248	142	106
Workers (all)	247	130	117
Main workers (total)	67	37	30
Main workers: Cultivators	29	15	14
Main workers: Agricultural labourers	26	14	12
Main workers: Household industry workers	0	0	0
Main workers: Other	12	8	4
Marginal workers (total)	180	93	87
Marginal workers: Cultivators	6	4	2
Marginal workers: Agricultural labourers	136	68	68
Marginal workers: Household industry workers	0	0	0
Marginal workers: Others	38	21	17
Non-workers	149	90	59
