= Ganyari, Berasia =

Ganyari
- village
- Location within Madhya Pradesh Location within India
- Coordinates: 23.735284°N 77.299736°E
- Country: India
- State: Madhya Pradesh
- District: Bhopal
- Tehsil: Berasia

Population (2011)
  - Total: 248
- Time zone: UTC+5:30 (IST)
- ISO 3166 code: MP-IN
- Census code: 482119

Ganyari is a village in the Bhopal district of Madhya Pradesh, India. It is located in the Berasia tehsil.

== Demographics ==
According to the 2011 census of India, Ganyari has 58 households. The effective literacy rate (i.e. the literacy rate of population excluding children aged 6 and below) is 39.42%.

Demographics (2011 Census)
| | Total | Male | Female |
|---|---|---|---|
| Population | 248 | 137 | 111 |
| Children aged below 6 years | 40 | 18 | 22 |
| Scheduled caste | 73 | 40 | 33 |
| Scheduled tribe | 6 | 3 | 3 |
| Literates | 82 | 59 | 23 |
| Workers (all) | 148 | 80 | 68 |
| Main workers (total) | 112 | 59 | 53 |
| Main workers: Cultivators | 7 | 7 | 0 |
| Main workers: Agricultural labourers | 105 | 52 | 53 |
| Main workers: Household industry workers | 0 | 0 | 0 |
| Main workers: Other | 0 | 0 | 0 |
| Marginal workers (total) | 36 | 21 | 15 |
| Marginal workers: Cultivators | 2 | 1 | 1 |
| Marginal workers: Agricultural labourers | 33 | 20 | 13 |
| Marginal workers: Household industry workers | 0 | 0 | 0 |
| Marginal workers: Others | 1 | 0 | 1 |
| Non-workers | 100 | 57 | 43 |
