= Dangroli =

Dangroli may refer to:

- Dangroli, Berasia, a village in India
- Dangroli, Huzur, a village in India
