= Dangroli, Berasia =

Dangroli
- village
- Location within Madhya Pradesh Location within India
- Coordinates: 23.6102205°N 77.5189458°E
- Country: India
- State: Madhya Pradesh
- District: Bhopal
- Tehsil: Berasia
- Elevation: 477 m (1,565 ft)

Population (2011)
  - Total: 479
- Time zone: UTC+5:30 (IST)
- ISO 3166 code: MP-IN
- 2011 census code: 482264

Dangroli is a village in the Bhopal district of Madhya Pradesh, India. It is located in the Berasia tehsil.

== Demographics ==
According to the 2011 census of India, Dangroli has 96 households. The effective literacy rate (i.e. the literacy rate of population excluding children aged 6 and below) is 64.3%.

Demographics (2011 Census)
	Total	Male	Female
Population	479	264	215
Children aged below 6 years	70	34	36
Scheduled caste	292	155	137
Scheduled tribe	2	0	2
Literates	263	173	90
Workers (all)	244	141	103
Main workers (total)	140	121	19
Main workers: Cultivators	37	33	4
Main workers: Agricultural labourers	97	82	15
Main workers: Household industry workers	0	0	0
Main workers: Other	6	6	0
Marginal workers (total)	104	20	84
Marginal workers: Cultivators	1	1	0
Marginal workers: Agricultural labourers	103	19	84
Marginal workers: Household industry workers	0	0	0
Marginal workers: Others	0	0	0
Non-workers	235	123	112
