= Dangroli, Huzur =

Dangroli
- village
- Location within Madhya Pradesh Location within India
- Coordinates: 23.215988°N 77.582327°E
- Country: India
- State: Madhya Pradesh
- District: Bhopal
- Tehsil: Huzur

Population (2011)
  - Total: 411
- Time zone: UTC+5:30 (IST)
- ISO 3166 code: MP-IN
- 2011 census code: 482439

Dangroli is a village in the Bhopal district of Madhya Pradesh, India. It is located in the Huzur tehsil and the Phanda block.

== Demographics ==
According to the 2011 census of India, Dangroli has 72 households. The effective literacy rate (i.e. the literacy rate of population excluding children aged 6 and below) is 77.65%.

Demographics (2011 Census)
	Total	Male	Female
Population	411	219	192
Children aged below 6 years	71	42	29
Scheduled caste	39	21	18
Scheduled tribe	12	7	5
Literates	264	147	117
Workers (all)	136	109	27
Main workers (total)	129	103	26
Main workers: Cultivators	98	85	13
Main workers: Agricultural labourers	9	6	3
Main workers: Household industry workers	10	5	5
Main workers: Other	12	7	5
Marginal workers (total)	7	6	1
Marginal workers: Cultivators	1	1	0
Marginal workers: Agricultural labourers	3	2	1
Marginal workers: Household industry workers	0	0	0
Marginal workers: Others	3	3	0
Non-workers	275	110	165
