= Jhikariya Kalan =

- village
- Location within Madhya Pradesh Location within India
- Coordinates: 23.5786364°N 77.4902726°E
- Country: India
- State: Madhya Pradesh
- District: Bhopal
- Tehsil: Berasia
- Elevation: 497 m (1,631 ft)

Population (2011)
  - Total: 625
- Time zone: UTC+5:30 (IST)
- ISO 3166 code: IN-MP
- 2011 census code: 482261

Jhikariya Kalan is a village in the Bhopal district of Madhya Pradesh, India. It is located in the Berasia tehsil.

== Demographics ==
According to the 2011 census of India, Jhikariya Kalan has 119 households. The effective literacy rate (i.e. the literacy rate of population excluding children aged 6 and below) is 67.82%.

Demographics (2011 Census)
| | Total | Male | Female |
|---|---|---|---|
| Population | 625 | 330 | 295 |
| Children aged below 6 years | 75 | 39 | 36 |
| Scheduled caste | 187 | 97 | 90 |
| Scheduled tribe | 0 | 0 | 0 |
| Literates | 373 | 225 | 148 |
| Workers (all) | 245 | 168 | 77 |
| Main workers (total) | 237 | 162 | 75 |
| Main workers: Cultivators | 135 | 96 | 39 |
| Main workers: Agricultural labourers | 83 | 51 | 32 |
| Main workers: Household industry workers | 1 | 1 | 0 |
| Main workers: Other | 18 | 14 | 4 |
| Marginal workers (total) | 8 | 6 | 2 |
| Marginal workers: Cultivators | 0 | 0 | 0 |
| Marginal workers: Agricultural labourers | 1 | 0 | 1 |
| Marginal workers: Household industry workers | 0 | 0 | 0 |
| Marginal workers: Others | 7 | 6 | 1 |
| Non-workers | 380 | 162 | 218 |
