= Ronjia Bazaft =

- village
- Location within Madhya Pradesh Location within India
- Coordinates: 23.5308978°N 77.4788014°E
- Country: India
- State: Madhya Pradesh
- District: Bhopal
- Tehsil: Berasia
- Elevation: 460 m (1,510 ft)

Population (2011)
  - Total: 729
- Time zone: UTC+5:30 (IST)
- ISO 3166 code: MP-IN
- 2011 census code: 482314

Ronjia Bazaft is a village in the Bhopal district of Madhya Pradesh, India. It is located in the Berasia tehsil.

== Demographics ==
According to the 2011 census of India, Ronjia Bazaft has 154 households. The effective literacy rate (i.e. the literacy rate of population excluding children aged 6 and below) is 79.49%.

Demographics (2011 Census)
| | Total | Male | Female |
|---|---|---|---|
| Population | 729 | 398 | 331 |
| Children aged below 6 years | 105 | 60 | 45 |
| Scheduled caste | 230 | 124 | 106 |
| Scheduled tribe | 0 | 0 | 0 |
| Literates | 496 | 298 | 198 |
| Workers (all) | 203 | 176 | 27 |
| Main workers (total) | 174 | 164 | 10 |
| Main workers: Cultivators | 87 | 82 | 5 |
| Main workers: Agricultural labourers | 74 | 72 | 2 |
| Main workers: Household industry workers | 1 | 1 | 0 |
| Main workers: Other | 12 | 9 | 3 |
| Marginal workers (total) | 29 | 12 | 17 |
| Marginal workers: Cultivators | 4 | 0 | 4 |
| Marginal workers: Agricultural labourers | 23 | 11 | 12 |
| Marginal workers: Household industry workers | 0 | 0 | 0 |
| Marginal workers: Others | 2 | 1 | 1 |
| Non-workers | 526 | 222 | 304 |
