= Khukaria =

- village
- Location within Madhya Pradesh Location within India
- Coordinates: 23.5917097°N 77.3640257°E
- Country: India
- State: Madhya Pradesh
- District: Bhopal
- Tehsil: Berasia
- Elevation: 486 m (1,594 ft)

Population (2011)
  - Total: 872
- Time zone: UTC+5:30 (IST)
- ISO 3166 code: MP-IN
- 2011 census code: 482238

Khukaria is a village in the Bhopal district of Madhya Pradesh, India. It is located in the Berasia tehsil.

== Demographics ==
According to the 2011 census of India, Khukaria had 202 households. The effective literacy rate (i.e. the literacy rate of population excluding children aged 6 and below) was 69.74%.

Demographics (2011 Census)
| | Total | Male | Female |
|---|---|---|---|
| Population | 872 | 456 | 416 |
| Children aged below 6 years | 155 | 75 | 80 |
| Scheduled caste | 245 | 121 | 124 |
| Scheduled tribe | 0 | 0 | 0 |
| Literates | 500 | 288 | 212 |
| Workers (all) | 242 | 211 | 31 |
| Main workers (total) | 210 | 194 | 16 |
| Main workers: Cultivators | 112 | 109 | 3 |
| Main workers: Agricultural labourers | 82 | 72 | 10 |
| Main workers: Household industry workers | 1 | 1 | 0 |
| Main workers: Other | 15 | 12 | 3 |
| Marginal workers (total) | 32 | 17 | 15 |
| Marginal workers: Cultivators | 0 | 0 | 0 |
| Marginal workers: Agricultural labourers | 31 | 16 | 15 |
| Marginal workers: Household industry workers | 0 | 0 | 0 |
| Marginal workers: Others | 1 | 1 | 0 |
| Non-workers | 630 | 245 | 385 |
