= Undrai =

- village
- Location within Madhya Pradesh Location within India
- Coordinates: 23.5528381°N 77.3180836°E
- Country: India
- State: Madhya Pradesh
- District: Bhopal
- Tehsil: Berasia
- Elevation: 497 m (1,631 ft)

Population (2011)
  - Total: 543
- Time zone: UTC+5:30 (IST)
- ISO 3166 code: MP-IN
- 2011 census code: 482247

Undrai is a village in the Bhopal district of Madhya Pradesh, India. It is located in the Berasia tehsil.

== Demographics ==
According to the 2011 census of India, Undrai has 121 households. The effective literacy rate (i.e. the literacy rate of population excluding children aged 6 and below) is 51.69%.

Demographics (2011 Census)
| | Total | Male | Female |
|---|---|---|---|
| Population | 543 | 294 | 249 |
| Children aged below 6 years | 69 | 43 | 26 |
| Scheduled caste | 51 | 29 | 22 |
| Scheduled tribe | 0 | 0 | 0 |
| Literates | 245 | 162 | 83 |
| Workers (all) | 328 | 171 | 157 |
| Main workers (total) | 306 | 165 | 141 |
| Main workers: Cultivators | 141 | 77 | 64 |
| Main workers: Agricultural labourers | 160 | 87 | 73 |
| Main workers: Household industry workers | 0 | 0 | 0 |
| Main workers: Other | 5 | 1 | 4 |
| Marginal workers (total) | 22 | 6 | 16 |
| Marginal workers: Cultivators | 6 | 1 | 5 |
| Marginal workers: Agricultural labourers | 16 | 5 | 11 |
| Marginal workers: Household industry workers | 0 | 0 | 0 |
| Marginal workers: Others | 0 | 0 | 0 |
| Non-workers | 215 | 123 | 92 |
