= Bhujpura Khurd =

- village
- Location within Madhya Pradesh Location within India
- Coordinates: 23.734506°N 77.269819°E
- Country: India
- State: Madhya Pradesh
- District: Bhopal
- Tehsil: Berasia

Population (2011)
  - Total: 70
- Time zone: UTC+5:30 (IST)
- ISO 3166 code: MP-IN
- Census code: 482081

Bhujpura Khurd is a village in the Bhopal district of Madhya Pradesh, India. It is located in the Berasia tehsil.

== Demographics ==
According to the 2011 census of India, Bhujpura Khurd has 15 households. The effective literacy rate (i.e. the literacy rate of population excluding children aged 6 and below) is 53.45%.

Demographics (2011 Census)
| | Total | Male | Female |
|---|---|---|---|
| Population | 70 | 40 | 30 |
| Children aged below 6 years | 12 | 7 | 5 |
| Scheduled caste | 19 | 11 | 8 |
| Scheduled tribe | 0 | 0 | 0 |
| Literates | 31 | 20 | 11 |
| Workers (all) | 46 | 27 | 19 |
| Main workers (total) | 29 | 18 | 11 |
| Main workers: Cultivators | 3 | 2 | 1 |
| Main workers: Agricultural labourers | 26 | 16 | 10 |
| Main workers: Household industry workers | 0 | 0 | 0 |
| Main workers: Other | 0 | 0 | 0 |
| Marginal workers (total) | 17 | 9 | 8 |
| Marginal workers: Cultivators | 2 | 2 | 0 |
| Marginal workers: Agricultural labourers | 15 | 7 | 8 |
| Marginal workers: Household industry workers | 0 | 0 | 0 |
| Marginal workers: Others | 0 | 0 | 0 |
| Non-workers | 24 | 13 | 11 |
