= Rampura Khurd =

- village
- Location within Madhya Pradesh Location within India
- Coordinates: 23.703980°N 77.423158°E
- Country: India
- State: Madhya Pradesh
- District: Bhopal
- Tehsil: Berasia

Population (2011)
  - Total: 513
- Time zone: UTC+5:30 (IST)
- ISO 3166 code: MP-IN
- Census code: 482206

Rampura Khurd is a village in the Bhopal district of Madhya Pradesh, India. It is located in the Berasia tehsil.

== Demographics ==
According to the 2011 census of India, Rampura Khurd has 97 households. The effective literacy rate (i.e. the literacy rate of population excluding children aged 6 and below) is 56.74%.

Demographics (2011 Census)
| | Total | Male | Female |
|---|---|---|---|
| Population | 513 | 266 | 247 |
| Children aged below 6 years | 83 | 47 | 36 |
| Scheduled caste | 207 | 105 | 102 |
| Scheduled tribe | 0 | 0 | 0 |
| Literates | 244 | 145 | 99 |
| Workers (all) | 284 | 147 | 137 |
| Main workers (total) | 88 | 81 | 7 |
| Main workers: Cultivators | 72 | 72 | 0 |
| Main workers: Agricultural labourers | 16 | 9 | 7 |
| Main workers: Household industry workers | 0 | 0 | 0 |
| Main workers: Other | 0 | 0 | 0 |
| Marginal workers (total) | 196 | 66 | 130 |
| Marginal workers: Cultivators | 5 | 4 | 1 |
| Marginal workers: Agricultural labourers | 190 | 61 | 129 |
| Marginal workers: Household industry workers | 0 | 0 | 0 |
| Marginal workers: Others | 1 | 1 | 0 |
| Non-workers | 229 | 119 | 110 |
