= Bahrawal =

- village
- Location within Madhya Pradesh Location within India
- Coordinates: 23.761444°N 77.250276°E
- Country: India
- State: Madhya Pradesh
- District: Bhopal
- Tehsil: Berasia

Population (2011)
  - Total: 1,013
- Time zone: UTC+5:30 (IST)
- ISO 3166 code: MP-IN
- Census code: 482063

Bahrawal is a village in the Bhopal district of Madhya Pradesh, India. It is located in the Berasia tehsil.

== Demographics ==
According to the 2011 census of India, Bahrawal has 199 households. The effective literacy rate (i.e. the literacy rate of population excluding children aged 6 and below) is 73.19%.

Demographics (2011 Census)
| | Total | Male | Female |
|---|---|---|---|
| Population | 1013 | 548 | 465 |
| Children aged below 6 years | 185 | 105 | 80 |
| Scheduled caste | 238 | 128 | 110 |
| Scheduled tribe | 0 | 0 | 0 |
| Literates | 606 | 380 | 226 |
| Workers (all) | 452 | 275 | 177 |
| Main workers (total) | 392 | 251 | 141 |
| Main workers: Cultivators | 142 | 93 | 49 |
| Main workers: Agricultural labourers | 204 | 118 | 86 |
| Main workers: Household industry workers | 4 | 4 | 0 |
| Main workers: Other | 42 | 36 | 6 |
| Marginal workers (total) | 60 | 24 | 36 |
| Marginal workers: Cultivators | 30 | 11 | 19 |
| Marginal workers: Agricultural labourers | 29 | 12 | 17 |
| Marginal workers: Household industry workers | 0 | 0 | 0 |
| Marginal workers: Others | 1 | 1 | 0 |
| Non-workers | 561 | 273 | 288 |
