= Bhaupura =

- village
- Location within Madhya Pradesh Location within India
- Coordinates: 23.677505°N 77.212748°E
- Country: India
- State: Madhya Pradesh
- District: Bhopal
- Tehsil: Berasia

Population (2011)
  - Total: 372
- Time zone: UTC+5:30 (IST)
- ISO 3166 code: MP-IN
- Census code: 482094

Bhaupura is a village in the Bhopal district of Madhya Pradesh, India. It is located in the Berasia tehsil.

== Demographics ==
According to the 2011 census of India, Bhaupura has 84 households. The effective literacy rate (i.e. the literacy rate of population excluding children aged 6 and below) is 46.34%.

Demographics (2011 Census)
| | Total | Male | Female |
|---|---|---|---|
| Population | 372 | 194 | 178 |
| Children aged below 6 years | 85 | 45 | 40 |
| Scheduled caste | 60 | 27 | 33 |
| Scheduled tribe | 0 | 0 | 0 |
| Literates | 133 | 90 | 43 |
| Workers (all) | 184 | 95 | 89 |
| Main workers (total) | 130 | 74 | 56 |
| Main workers: Cultivators | 65 | 42 | 23 |
| Main workers: Agricultural labourers | 63 | 31 | 32 |
| Main workers: Household industry workers | 0 | 0 | 0 |
| Main workers: Other | 2 | 1 | 1 |
| Marginal workers (total) | 54 | 21 | 33 |
| Marginal workers: Cultivators | 18 | 1 | 17 |
| Marginal workers: Agricultural labourers | 25 | 14 | 11 |
| Marginal workers: Household industry workers | 0 | 0 | 0 |
| Marginal workers: Others | 11 | 6 | 5 |
| Non-workers | 188 | 99 | 89 |
