= Parsoriya =

- village
- Location within Madhya Pradesh Location within India
- Coordinates: 23.719022°N 77.547367°E
- Country: India
- State: Madhya Pradesh
- District: Bhopal
- Tehsil: Berasia

Population (2011)
  - Total: 673
- Time zone: UTC+5:30 (IST)
- ISO 3166 code: MP-IN
- Census code: 482163

Parsoriya is a village in the Bhopal district of Madhya Pradesh, India. It is located in the Berasia tehsil.

== Demographics ==
According to the 2011 census of India, Parsoriya has 115 households. The effective literacy rate (i.e. the literacy rate of population excluding children aged 6 and below) is 64.94%.

Demographics (2011 Census)
| | Total | Male | Female |
|---|---|---|---|
| Population | 673 | 347 | 326 |
| Children aged below 6 years | 134 | 68 | 66 |
| Scheduled caste | 222 | 119 | 103 |
| Scheduled tribe | 0 | 0 | 0 |
| Literates | 350 | 229 | 121 |
| Workers (all) | 274 | 173 | 101 |
| Main workers (total) | 170 | 166 | 4 |
| Main workers: Cultivators | 81 | 81 | 0 |
| Main workers: Agricultural labourers | 78 | 75 | 3 |
| Main workers: Household industry workers | 0 | 0 | 0 |
| Main workers: Other | 11 | 10 | 1 |
| Marginal workers (total) | 104 | 7 | 97 |
| Marginal workers: Cultivators | 25 | 0 | 25 |
| Marginal workers: Agricultural labourers | 77 | 6 | 71 |
| Marginal workers: Household industry workers | 1 | 1 | 0 |
| Marginal workers: Others | 1 | 0 | 1 |
| Non-workers | 399 | 174 | 225 |
