= Bijapura =

Bijapura may refer to:

- Bijapur, a city in Karnataka, India
- Bijapura, Bhopal, a village in Bhopal, India
