= Bijapura, Bhopal =

Bijapura
- village
- Location within Madhya Pradesh Location within India
- Coordinates: 23.8552557°N 77.2900787°E
- Country: India
- State: Madhya Pradesh
- District: Bhopal
- Tehsil: Berasia
- Elevation: 462 m (1,516 ft)

Population (2011)
  - Total: 137
- Time zone: UTC+5:30 (IST)
- ISO 3166 code: MP-IN
- 2011 census code: 482328

Bijapura is a village in the Bhopal district of Madhya Pradesh, India. It is located in the Berasia tehsil.

== Demographics ==
According to the 2011 census of India, Bijapura has 24 households. The effective literacy rate (i.e. the literacy rate of population excluding children aged 6 and below) is 51.2%.

Demographics (2011 Census)
	Total	Male	Female
Population	137	79	58
Children aged below 6 years	12	5	7
Scheduled caste	0	0	0
Scheduled tribe	0	0	0
Literates	64	46	18
Workers (all)	78	46	32
Main workers (total)	71	43	28
Main workers: Cultivators	66	38	28
Main workers: Agricultural labourers	4	4	0
Main workers: Household industry workers	0	0	0
Main workers: Other	1	1	0
Marginal workers (total)	7	3	4
Marginal workers: Cultivators	5	2	3
Marginal workers: Agricultural labourers	2	1	1
Marginal workers: Household industry workers	0	0	0
Marginal workers: Others	0	0	0
Non-workers	59	33	26
