= Tarawli Kalan =

Tarawli Kalan Taravali Kala, Tarawali Kalan
- village
- Location within Madhya Pradesh Location within India
- Coordinates: 23.5718642°N 77.3805318°E
- Country: India
- State: Madhya Pradesh
- District: Bhopal
- Tehsil: Berasia
- Elevation: 491 m (1,611 ft)

Population (2011)
  - Total: 1,212
- Time zone: UTC+5:30 (IST)
- PIN: 463101
- ISO 3166 code: MP-IN
- 2011 census code: 482251

Tarawli Kalan is a village in the Bhopal district of Madhya Pradesh, India. It is located in the Berasia tehsil.

== Demographics ==
According to the 2011 census of India, Tarawli Kalan has 235 households. The effective literacy rate (i.e. the literacy rate of population excluding children aged 6 and below) is 68.89%.

Demographics (2011 Census)
	Total	Male	Female
Population	1212	624	588
Children aged below 6 years	209	93	116
Scheduled caste	666	349	317
Scheduled tribe	18	9	9
Literates	691	426	265
Workers (all)	644	357	287
Main workers (total)	320	232	88
Main workers: Cultivators	57	42	15
Main workers: Agricultural labourers	245	176	69
Main workers: Household industry workers	1	0	1
Main workers: Other	17	14	3
Marginal workers (total)	324	125	199
Marginal workers: Cultivators	38	9	29
Marginal workers: Agricultural labourers	280	113	167
Marginal workers: Household industry workers	3	2	1
Marginal workers: Others	3	1	2
Non-workers	568	267	301
