= Birha Shyam Khedi =

Birha Shyam Khedi Birha Shym Khedi
- village
- Location within Madhya Pradesh Location within India
- Coordinates: 23.6196793°N 77.3841197°E
- Country: India
- State: Madhya Pradesh
- District: Bhopal
- Tehsil: Berasia
- Elevation: 477 m (1,565 ft)

Population (2011)
  - Total: 1,489
- Time zone: UTC+5:30 (IST)
- ISO 3166 code: MP-IN
- 2011 census code: 482233

Birha Shyam Khedi is a village in the Bhopal district of Madhya Pradesh, India. It is located in the Berasia tehsil.

== Demographics ==
According to the 2011 census of India, Birha Shyam Khedi has 335 households. The effective literacy rate (i.e. the literacy rate of population excluding children aged 6 and below) is 71.16%.

Demographics (2011 Census)
	Total	Male	Female
Population	1489	788	701
Children aged below 6 years	244	130	114
Scheduled caste	713	372	341
Scheduled tribe	14	10	4
Literates	886	548	338
Workers (all)	709	385	324
Main workers (total)	703	381	322
Main workers: Cultivators	142	94	48
Main workers: Agricultural labourers	521	253	268
Main workers: Household industry workers	9	8	1
Main workers: Other	31	26	5
Marginal workers (total)	6	4	2
Marginal workers: Cultivators	2	2	0
Marginal workers: Agricultural labourers	4	2	2
Marginal workers: Household industry workers	0	0	0
Marginal workers: Others	0	0	0
Non-workers	780	403	377
