= Bhujpura Kalan =

- village
- Location within Madhya Pradesh Location within India
- Coordinates: 23.748152°N 77.265340°E
- Country: India
- State: Madhya Pradesh
- District: Bhopal
- Tehsil: Berasia

Population (2011)
  - Total: 1,037
- Time zone: UTC+5:30 (IST)
- ISO 3166 code: IN-MP
- Census code: 482080

Bhujpura Kalan is a village in the Bhopal district of Madhya Pradesh, India. It is located in the Berasia tehsil.

== Demographics ==
According to the 2011 census of India, Bhujpura Kalan has 205 households. The effective literacy rate (i.e. the literacy rate of population excluding children aged 6 and below) is 68.51%.

Demographics (2011 Census)
	Total	Male	Female
Population	1037	540	497
Children aged below 6 years	205	112	93
Scheduled caste	248	136	112
Scheduled tribe	14	7	7
Literates	570	347	223
Workers (all)	463	236	227
Main workers (total)	177	167	10
Main workers: Cultivators	145	139	6
Main workers: Agricultural labourers	22	20	2
Main workers: Household industry workers	6	6	0
Main workers: Other	4	2	2
Marginal workers (total)	286	69	217
Marginal workers: Cultivators	114	11	103
Marginal workers: Agricultural labourers	169	57	112
Marginal workers: Household industry workers	3	1	2
Marginal workers: Others	0	0	0
Non-workers	574	304	270

== Geography ==
The village is located in central India, within rural areas of the state of Madhya Pradesh.
