= Garentiyadangi =

Garentiyadangi Garentiya Dangi
- village
- Location within Madhya Pradesh Location within India
- Coordinates: 23.5685783°N 77.4386429°E
- Country: India
- State: Madhya Pradesh
- District: Bhopal
- Tehsil: Berasia
- Elevation: 487 m (1,598 ft)

Population (2011)
  - Total: 862
- Time zone: UTC+5:30 (IST)
- ISO 3166 code: IN-MP
- 2011 census code: 482276

Garentiyadangi is a small village in the Bhopal district of Madhya Pradesh, India. It is located in the Berasia tehsil.

== Demographics ==
According to the 2011 census of India, Garentiyadangi has 187 households. The effective literacy rate (i.e. the literacy rate of population excluding children aged 6 and below) is 76.73%.

Demographics (2011 Census)
	Total	Male	Female
Population	862	457	405
Children aged below 6 years	127	66	61
Scheduled caste	512	270	242
Scheduled tribe	0	0	0
Literates	564	344	220
Workers (all)	377	230	147
Main workers (total)	361	224	137
Main workers: Cultivators	166	107	59
Main workers: Agricultural labourers	186	109	77
Main workers: Household industry workers	0	0	0
Main workers: Other	9	8	1
Marginal workers (total)	16	6	10
Marginal workers: Cultivators	7	1	6
Marginal workers: Agricultural labourers	6	3	3
Marginal workers: Household industry workers	0	0	0
Marginal workers: Others	3	2	1
Non-workers	485	227	258
