= Lalariya =

Lalariya Lalaria
- village
- Location within Madhya Pradesh Location within India
- Coordinates: 23.649222°N 77.558724°E
- Country: India
- State: Madhya Pradesh
- District: Bhopal
- Tehsil: Berasia

Population (2011)
  - Total: 6,385
- Time zone: UTC+5:30 (IST)
- ISO 3166 code: MP-IN
- Census code: 482194

Lalariya is a village in the Bhopal district of Madhya Pradesh, India. It is located in the Berasia tehsil.

== Demographics ==
According to the 2011 census of India, Lalariya has 1292 households. The effective literacy rate (i.e. the literacy rate of population excluding children aged 6 and below) is 61.61%.

It is the village with the largest population in Madhya Pradesh.

.

Demographics (2011 Census)
	Total	Male	Female
Population	6385	3340	3045
Children aged below 6 years	1194	624	570
Scheduled caste	820	415	405
Scheduled tribe	45	26	19
Literates	3198	1893	1305
Workers (all)	2331	1632	699
Main workers (total)	1302	1160	142
Main workers: Cultivators	301	264	37
Main workers: Agricultural labourers	639	568	71
Main workers: Household industry workers	8	7	1
Main workers: Other	354	321	33
Marginal workers (total)	1029	472	557
Marginal workers: Cultivators	120	39	81
Marginal workers: Agricultural labourers	796	369	427
Marginal workers: Household industry workers	15	6	9
Marginal workers: Others	98	58	40
Non-workers	4054	1708	2346
