= Nalkheda, Bhopal =

Nalkheda
- village
- Location within Madhya Pradesh Location within India
- Coordinates: 23.8356771°N 76.2363989°E
- Country: India
- State: Madhya Pradesh
- District: Bhopal
- Tehsil: Berasia
- Elevation: 390 m (1,280 ft)

Population (2011)
  - Total: 2,285
- Time zone: UTC+5:30 (IST)
- ISO 3166 code: MP-IN
- 2011 census code: 482250

Nalkheda is a village in the Bhopal district of Madhya Pradesh, India. It is located in the Berasia tehsil.

== Demographics ==
According to the 2011 census of India, Nalkheda has 463 households. The effective literacy rate (i.e. the literacy rate of population excluding children aged 6 and below) is 68.28%.

Demographics (2011 Census)
	Total	Male	Female
Population	2285	1203	1082
Children aged below 6 years	365	199	166
Scheduled caste	406	210	196
Scheduled tribe	10	4	6
Literates	1311	786	525
Workers (all)	730	559	171
Main workers (total)	231	211	20
Main workers: Cultivators	166	158	8
Main workers: Agricultural labourers	18	15	3
Main workers: Household industry workers	6	5	1
Main workers: Other	41	33	8
Marginal workers (total)	499	348	151
Marginal workers: Cultivators	16	9	7
Marginal workers: Agricultural labourers	433	312	121
Marginal workers: Household industry workers	46	24	22
Marginal workers: Others	4	3	1
Non-workers	1555	644	911
