= Charpahadi Bazyaft =

- village
- Location within Madhya Pradesh Location within India
- Coordinates: 23.5426514°N 77.4974416°E
- Country: India
- State: Madhya Pradesh
- District: Bhopal
- Tehsil: Berasia
- Elevation: 462 m (1,516 ft)

Population (2011)
  - Total: 168
- Time zone: UTC+5:30 (IST)
- ISO 3166 code: IN-MP
- 2011 census code: 482275

Charpahadi Bazyaft is a village in the Bhopal district of Madhya Pradesh, India. It is located in the Berasia tehsil.

== Demographics ==
According to the 2011 census of India, Charpahadi Bazyaft has 39 households. The effective literacy rate (i.e. the literacy rate of population excluding children aged 6 and below) is 63.45%.

Demographics (2011 Census)
	Total	Male	Female
Population	168	91	77
Children aged below 6 years	23	10	13
Scheduled caste	92	51	41
Scheduled tribe	0	0	0
Literates	92	58	34
Workers (all)	71	38	33
Main workers (total)	66	35	31
Main workers: Cultivators	35	18	17
Main workers: Agricultural labourers	30	16	14
Main workers: Household industry workers	0	0	0
Main workers: Other	1	1	0
Marginal workers (total)	5	3	2
Marginal workers: Cultivators	2	1	1
Marginal workers: Agricultural labourers	3	2	1
Marginal workers: Household industry workers	0	0	0
Marginal workers: Others	0	0	0
Non-workers	97	53	44
