= Sonkatch, Bhopal =

Sonkatch
- village
- Location within Madhya Pradesh Location within India
- Coordinates: 23.5523129°N 77.4185584°E
- Country: India
- State: Madhya Pradesh
- District: Bhopal
- Tehsil: Berasia
- Elevation: 496 m (1,627 ft)

Population (2011)
  - Total: 1,001
- Time zone: UTC+5:30 (IST)
- ISO 3166 code: MP-IN
- 2011 census code: 482277

Sonkatch is a village in the Bhopal district of Madhya Pradesh, India. It is located in the Berasia tehsil.

== Demographics ==
According to the 2011 census of India, Sonkatch has 218 households. The effective literacy rate (i.e. the literacy rate of population excluding children aged 6 and below) is 68.42%.

Demographics (2011 Census)
	Total	Male	Female
Population	1001	496	505
Children aged below 6 years	165	72	93
Scheduled caste	370	178	192
Scheduled tribe	147	73	74
Literates	572	316	256
Workers (all)	373	279	94
Main workers (total)	231	196	35
Main workers: Cultivators	84	76	8
Main workers: Agricultural labourers	101	81	20
Main workers: Household industry workers	13	12	1
Main workers: Other	33	27	6
Marginal workers (total)	142	83	59
Marginal workers: Cultivators	2	0	2
Marginal workers: Agricultural labourers	129	78	51
Marginal workers: Household industry workers	3	0	3
Marginal workers: Others	8	5	3
Non-workers	628	217	411
