= Berkhedi Kalan =

- village
- Location within Madhya Pradesh Location within India
- Coordinates: 23.4389351°N 77.4271665°E
- Country: India
- State: Madhya Pradesh
- District: Bhopal
- Tehsil: Berasia
- Elevation: 478 m (1,568 ft)

Population (2011)
  - Total: 619
- Time zone: UTC+5:30 (IST)
- ISO 3166 code: MP-IN
- 2011 census code: 482307

Berkhedi Kalan is a village in the Bhopal district of Madhya Pradesh, India. It is located in the Berasia tehsil.

== Demographics ==
According to the 2011 census of India, Berkhedi Kalan has 139 households. The effective literacy rate (i.e. the literacy rate of population excluding children aged 6 and below) was 64.19%.

Demographics (2011 Census)
	Total	Male	Female
Population	619	330	289
Children aged below 6 years	94	48	46
Scheduled caste	180	99	81
Scheduled tribe	0	0	0
Literates	337	211	126
Workers (all)	319	178	141
Main workers (total)	318	178	140
Main workers: Cultivators	55	32	23
Main workers: Agricultural labourers	248	136	112
Main workers: Household industry workers	2	0	2
Main workers: Other	13	10	3
Marginal workers (total)	1	0	1
Marginal workers: Cultivators	0	0	0
Marginal workers: Agricultural labourers	0	0	0
Marginal workers: Household industry workers	0	0	0
Marginal workers: Others	1	0	1
Non-workers	300	152	148
