= Garenthiya Bazyft =

- village
- Location within Madhya Pradesh Location within India
- Coordinates: 23.655917°N 77.513271°E
- Country: India
- State: Madhya Pradesh
- District: Bhopal
- Tehsil: Berasia

Population (2011)
  - Total: 520
- Time zone: UTC+5:30 (IST)
- ISO 3166 code: MP-IN
- Census code: 482192

Garenthiya Bazyft is a village in the Bhopal district of Madhya Pradesh, India. It is located in the Berasia tehsil. A part of the Dungaria dam reservoir is located in this village.

== Demographics ==
According to the 2011 census of India, Garenthiya Bazyft has 102 households. The effective literacy rate (i.e. the literacy rate of population excluding children aged 6 and below) is 69.41%.

Demographics (2011 Census)
	Total	Male	Female
Population	520	292	228
Children aged below 6 years	82	47	35
Scheduled caste	293	162	131
Scheduled tribe	0	0	0
Literates	304	199	105
Workers (all)	254	141	113
Main workers (total)	154	110	44
Main workers: Cultivators	96	68	28
Main workers: Agricultural labourers	55	39	16
Main workers: Household industry workers	0	0	0
Main workers: Other	3	3	0
Marginal workers (total)	100	31	69
Marginal workers: Cultivators	24	8	16
Marginal workers: Agricultural labourers	76	23	53
Marginal workers: Household industry workers	0	0	0
Marginal workers: Others	0	0	0
Non-workers	266	151	115
