= Khitwas =

- village
- Location within Madhya Pradesh Location within India
- Coordinates: 23.6915982°N 77.3697672°E
- Country: India
- State: Madhya Pradesh
- District: Bhopal
- Tehsil: Berasia
- Elevation: 478 m (1,568 ft)

Population (2011)
  - Total: 746
- Demonym: Khitwasi
- Time zone: UTC+5:30 (IST)
- ISO 3166 code: MP-IN
- 2011 census code: 482217

Khitwas is a village in the Bhopal district of Madhya Pradesh, India. It is located in the Berasia tehsil.

== Demographics ==
According to the 2011 census of India, Khitwas has 172 households. The effective literacy rate (i.e. the literacy rate of population excluding children aged 6 and below) is 61.32%.

Demographics (2011 Census)
	Total	Male	Female
Population	746	396	350
Children aged below 6 years	123	62	61
Scheduled caste	216	114	102
Scheduled tribe	18	8	10
Literates	382	243	139
Workers (all)	398	220	178
Main workers (total)	301	211	90
Main workers: Cultivators	199	131	68
Main workers: Agricultural labourers	82	62	20
Main workers: Household industry workers	0	0	0
Main workers: Other	20	18	2
Marginal workers (total)	97	9	88
Marginal workers: Cultivators	53	3	50
Marginal workers: Agricultural labourers	43	6	37
Marginal workers: Household industry workers	0	0	0
Marginal workers: Others	1	0	1
Non-workers	348	176	172
