= Arrawati =

Arrawati Arowali
- village
- Location within Madhya Pradesh Location within India
- Coordinates: 23.55493935°N 77.50601292°E
- Country: India
- State: Madhya Pradesh
- District: Bhopal
- Tehsil: Berasia
- Elevation: 468 m (1,535 ft)

Population (2011)
  - Total: 842
- Time zone: UTC+5:30 (IST)
- ISO 3166 code: MP-IN
- 2011 census code: 482273

Arrawati is a village in the Bhopal district of Madhya Pradesh, India. It is located in the Berasia tehsil.

== Demographics ==
According to the 2011 census of India, Arrawati has 196 households. The effective literacy rate (i.e. the literacy rate of population excluding children aged 6 and below) is 76.93%.

Demographics (2011 Census)
	Total	Male	Female
Population	842	427	415
Children aged below 6 years	144	73	71
Scheduled caste	221	121	100
Scheduled tribe	18	5	13
Literates	537	317	220
Workers (all)	440	244	196
Main workers (total)	87	75	12
Main workers: Cultivators	67	57	10
Main workers: Agricultural labourers	6	5	1
Main workers: Household industry workers	0	0	0
Main workers: Other	14	13	1
Marginal workers (total)	353	169	184
Marginal workers: Cultivators	60	14	46
Marginal workers: Agricultural labourers	291	154	137
Marginal workers: Household industry workers	0	0	0
Marginal workers: Others	2	1	1
Non-workers	402	183	219
