= Budhor Kalan =

- village
- Location within Madhya Pradesh Location within India
- Coordinates: 23.5003957°N 77.4964835°E
- Country: India
- State: Madhya Pradesh
- District: Bhopal
- Tehsil: Berasia
- Elevation: 468 m (1,535 ft)

Population (2011)
  - Total: 823
- Time zone: UTC+5:30 (IST)
- ISO 3166 code: MP-IN
- 2011 census code: 482318

Budhor Kalan is a village in the Bhopal district of Madhya Pradesh, India. It is located in the Berasia tehsil.

== Demographics ==
According to the 2011 census of India, Budhor Kalan has 144 households. The effective literacy rate (i.e. the literacy rate of population excluding children aged 6 and below) is 66.83%.

Demographics (2011 Census)
	Total	Male	Female
Population	823	443	380
Children aged below 6 years	205	109	96
Scheduled caste	249	144	105
Scheduled tribe	0	0	0
Literates	413	273	140
Workers (all)	384	212	172
Main workers (total)	158	151	7
Main workers: Cultivators	33	32	1
Main workers: Agricultural labourers	117	113	4
Main workers: Household industry workers	1	1	0
Main workers: Other	7	5	2
Marginal workers (total)	226	61	165
Marginal workers: Cultivators	1	1	0
Marginal workers: Agricultural labourers	223	59	164
Marginal workers: Household industry workers	0	0	0
Marginal workers: Others	2	1	1
Non-workers	439	231	208
