= Chanda Saloi =

- village
- Location within Madhya Pradesh Location within India
- Coordinates: 23.7061302°N 77.4042102°E
- Country: India
- State: Madhya Pradesh
- District: Bhopal
- Tehsil: Berasia
- Elevation: 482 m (1,581 ft)

Population (2011)
  - Total: 533
- Time zone: UTC+5:30 (IST)
- ISO 3166 code: IN-MP
- 2011 census code: 482218

Chanda Saloi is a village in the Bhopal district of Madhya Pradesh, India. It is located in the Berasia tehsil.

== Demographics ==
According to the 2011 census of India, Chanda Saloi has 117 households. The effective literacy rate (i.e. the literacy rate of population excluding children aged 6 and below) is 51.19%.

Demographics (2011 Census)
	Total	Male	Female
Population	533	280	253
Children aged below 6 years	113	66	47
Scheduled caste	64	38	26
Scheduled tribe	37	19	18
Literates	215	132	83
Workers (all)	273	142	131
Main workers (total)	234	137	97
Main workers: Cultivators	199	115	84
Main workers: Agricultural labourers	33	20	13
Main workers: Household industry workers	0	0	0
Main workers: Other	2	2	0
Marginal workers (total)	39	5	34
Marginal workers: Cultivators	32	3	29
Marginal workers: Agricultural labourers	7	2	5
Marginal workers: Household industry workers	0	0	0
Marginal workers: Others	0	0	0
Non-workers	260	138	122
