= Khejra Gopi =

- village
- Location within Madhya Pradesh Location within India
- Coordinates: 23.6254553°N 77.3654611°E
- Country: India
- State: Madhya Pradesh
- District: Bhopal
- Tehsil: Berasia
- Elevation: 476 m (1,562 ft)

Population (2011)
  - Total: 592
- Time zone: UTC+5:30 (IST)
- ISO 3166 code: MP-IN
- 2011 census code: 482228

Khejra Gopi is a village in the Bhopal district of Madhya Pradesh, India. It is located in the Berasia tehsil.

== Demographics ==
According to the 2011 census of India, Khejra Gopi has 104 households. The effective literacy rate (i.e. the literacy rate of population excluding children aged 6 and below) is 61.31%.

Demographics (2011 Census)
	Total	Male	Female
Population	592	318	274
Children aged below 6 years	150	78	72
Scheduled caste	8	5	3
Scheduled tribe	0	0	0
Literates	271	170	101
Workers (all)	134	127	7
Main workers (total)	114	109	5
Main workers: Cultivators	41	41	0
Main workers: Agricultural labourers	72	67	5
Main workers: Household industry workers	0	0	0
Main workers: Other	1	1	0
Marginal workers (total)	20	18	2
Marginal workers: Cultivators	1	1	0
Marginal workers: Agricultural labourers	19	17	2
Marginal workers: Household industry workers	0	0	0
Marginal workers: Others	0	0	0
Non-workers	458	191	267
