= Pipalkheda =

- village
- Location within Madhya Pradesh Location within India
- Coordinates: 23.4755363°N 77.3381855°E
- Country: India
- State: Madhya Pradesh
- District: Bhopal
- Tehsil: Berasia
- Elevation: 503 m (1,650 ft)

Population (2011)
  - Total: 1,405
- Time zone: UTC+5:30 (IST)
- ISO 3166 code: MP-IN
- 2011 census code: 482289

Pipalkheda is a village in the Bhopal district of Madhya Pradesh, India. It is located in the Berasia tehsil.

== Demographics ==
According to the 2011 census of India, Pipalkheda has 299 households. The effective literacy rate (i.e. the literacy rate of population excluding children aged 6 and below) is 74.16%.

Demographics (2011 Census)
	Total	Male	Female
Population	1405	732	673
Children aged below 6 years	213	110	103
Scheduled caste	195	100	95
Scheduled tribe	0	0	0
Literates	884	534	350
Workers (all)	672	383	289
Main workers (total)	660	379	281
Main workers: Cultivators	104	86	18
Main workers: Agricultural labourers	519	272	247
Main workers: Household industry workers	0	0	0
Main workers: Other	37	21	16
Marginal workers (total)	12	4	8
Marginal workers: Cultivators	1	1	0
Marginal workers: Agricultural labourers	8	2	6
Marginal workers: Household industry workers	1	1	0
Marginal workers: Others	2	0	2
Non-workers	733	349	384
