= Pipalkhedi =

- village
- Location within Madhya Pradesh Location within India
- Coordinates: 23.5498487°N 77.4960078°E
- Country: India
- State: Madhya Pradesh
- District: Bhopal
- Tehsil: Berasia
- Elevation: 469 m (1,539 ft)

Population (2011)
  - Total: 527
- Time zone: UTC+5:30 (IST)
- ISO 3166 code: MP-IN
- 2011 census code: 482274

Pipalkhedi is a village in the Bhopal district of Madhya Pradesh, India. It is located in the Berasia tehsil.

== Demographics ==
According to the 2011 census of India, Pipalkhedi has 127 households. The effective literacy rate (i.e. the literacy rate of population excluding children aged 6 and below) is 79.57%.

Demographics (2011 Census)
	Total	Male	Female
Population	527	280	247
Children aged below 6 years	62	35	27
Scheduled caste	41	20	21
Scheduled tribe	19	8	11
Literates	370	221	149
Workers (all)	202	127	75
Main workers (total)	66	62	4
Main workers: Cultivators	60	57	3
Main workers: Agricultural labourers	3	2	1
Main workers: Household industry workers	0	0	0
Main workers: Other	3	3	0
Marginal workers (total)	136	65	71
Marginal workers: Cultivators	1	1	0
Marginal workers: Agricultural labourers	120	56	64
Marginal workers: Household industry workers	1	0	1
Marginal workers: Others	14	8	6
Non-workers	325	153	172
