= Sagoni Jora =

- village
- Location within Madhya Pradesh Location within India
- Coordinates: 23.4632724°N 77.4386429°E
- Country: India
- State: Madhya Pradesh
- District: Bhopal
- Tehsil: Berasia
- Elevation: 476 m (1,562 ft)

Population (2011)
  - Total: 272
- Time zone: UTC+5:30 (IST)
- ISO 3166 code: MP-IN
- 2011 census code: 482308

Sagoni Jora is a village in the Bhopal district of Madhya Pradesh, India. It is located in the Berasia tehsil.

== Demographics ==
According to the 2011 census of India, Sagoni Jora has 53 households. The effective literacy rate (i.e. the literacy rate of population excluding children aged 6 and below) is 63.8%.

Demographics (2011 Census)
	Total	Male	Female
Population	272	158	114
Children aged below 6 years	51	27	24
Scheduled caste	209	120	89
Scheduled tribe	0	0	0
Literates	141	95	46
Workers (all)	117	68	49
Main workers (total)	27	21	6
Main workers: Cultivators	11	11	0
Main workers: Agricultural labourers	15	10	5
Main workers: Household industry workers	0	0	0
Main workers: Other	1	0	1
Marginal workers (total)	90	47	43
Marginal workers: Cultivators	3	1	2
Marginal workers: Agricultural labourers	86	46	40
Marginal workers: Household industry workers	0	0	0
Marginal workers: Others	1	0	1
Non-workers	155	90	65
