= Semri Kalan =

- village
- Location within Madhya Pradesh Location within India
- Coordinates: 23.1218049°N 77.4314703°E
- Country: India
- State: Madhya Pradesh
- District: Bhopal
- Tehsil: Berasia
- Elevation: 462 m (1,516 ft)

Population (2011)
  - Total: 1,044
- Time zone: UTC+5:30 (IST)
- ISO 3166 code: MP-IN
- 2011 census code: 482279

Semri Kalan is a village in the Bhopal district of Madhya Pradesh, India. It is located in the Berasia tehsil.

== Demographics ==
According to the 2011 census of India, Semri Kalan has 243 households. The effective literacy rate (i.e. the literacy rate of population excluding children aged 6 and below) is 79.58%.

Demographics (2011 Census)
	Total	Male	Female
Population	1044	556	488
Children aged below 6 years	148	80	68
Scheduled caste	346	184	162
Scheduled tribe	1	1	0
Literates	713	439	274
Workers (all)	384	279	105
Main workers (total)	148	140	8
Main workers: Cultivators	114	108	6
Main workers: Agricultural labourers	16	15	1
Main workers: Household industry workers	2	2	0
Main workers: Other	16	15	1
Marginal workers (total)	236	139	97
Marginal workers: Cultivators	23	15	8
Marginal workers: Agricultural labourers	191	111	80
Marginal workers: Household industry workers	11	5	6
Marginal workers: Others	11	8	3
Non-workers	660	277	383
