= Bhesoda =

- village
- Location within Madhya Pradesh Location within India
- Coordinates: 23.5757111°N 77.4185584°E
- Country: India
- State: Madhya Pradesh
- District: Bhopal
- Tehsil: Berasia
- Elevation: 491 m (1,611 ft)

Population (2011)
  - Total: 1,560
- Time zone: UTC+5:30 (IST)
- ISO 3166 code: MP-IN
- 2011 census code: 482256

Bhesoda is a village in the Bhopal district of Madhya Pradesh, India. It is located in the Berasia tehsil.

== Demographics ==
According to the 2011 census of India, Bhesoda had 294 households. The effective literacy rate (i.e. the literacy rate of population excluding children aged 6 and below) was 71.46%.

Demographics (2011 census)
	Total	Male	Female
Population	1,560	831	729
Children aged below 6 years	197	106	91
Scheduled caste	362	191	171
Scheduled tribe	1	1	0
Literates	974	605	369
Workers (all)	548	417	131
Main workers (total)	286	266	20
Main workers: Cultivators	189	181	8
Main workers: Agricultural labourers	62	58	4
Main workers: Household industry workers	7	5	2
Main workers: Other	28	22	6
Marginal workers (total)	262	151	111
Marginal workers: Cultivators	5	4	1
Marginal workers: Agricultural labourers	249	142	107
Marginal workers: Household industry workers	1	0	1
Marginal workers: Others	7	5	2
Non-workers	1,012	414	598
