= Semra Kalan =

- village
- Location within Madhya Pradesh Location within India
- Coordinates: 23.271052°N 77.4314703°E
- Country: India
- State: Madhya Pradesh
- District: Bhopal
- Tehsil: Berasia
- Elevation: 490 m (1,610 ft)

Population (2011)
  - Total: 1,026
- Time zone: UTC+5:30 (IST)
- ISO 3166 code: MP-IN
- 2011 census code: 482259

Semra Kalan is a village in the Bhopal district of Madhya Pradesh, India. It is located in the Berasia tehsil.

== Demographics ==
According to the 2011 census of India, Semra Kalan has 209 households. The effective literacy rate (i.e. the literacy rate of population excluding children aged 6 and below) is 70.09%.

Demographics (2011 Census)
	Total	Male	Female
Population	1026	544	482
Children aged below 6 years	140	68	72
Scheduled caste	286	149	137
Scheduled tribe	5	3	2
Literates	621	393	228
Workers (all)	526	300	226
Main workers (total)	238	216	22
Main workers: Cultivators	162	152	10
Main workers: Agricultural labourers	25	20	5
Main workers: Household industry workers	11	11	0
Main workers: Other	40	33	7
Marginal workers (total)	288	84	204
Marginal workers: Cultivators	59	33	26
Marginal workers: Agricultural labourers	197	30	167
Marginal workers: Household industry workers	11	7	4
Marginal workers: Others	21	14	7
Non-workers	500	244	256
