= Babdi Khar =

- village
- Location within Madhya Pradesh Location within India
- Coordinates: 23.5921925°N 77.3166476°E
- Country: India
- State: Madhya Pradesh
- District: Bhopal
- Tehsil: Berasia
- Elevation: 499 m (1,637 ft)

Population (2011)
  - Total: 432
- Time zone: UTC+5:30 (IST)
- ISO 3166 code: MP-IN
- 2011 census code: 482240

Babdi Khar is a village in the Bhopal district of Madhya Pradesh, India. It is located in the Berasia tehsil.

== Demographics ==
According to the 2011 census of India, Babdi Khar has 109 households. The effective literacy rate (i.e. the literacy rate of population excluding children aged 6 and below) is 76.76%.

Demographics (2011 Census)
	Total	Male	Female
Population	432	234	198
Children aged below 6 years	49	26	23
Scheduled caste	38	24	14
Scheduled tribe	56	31	25
Literates	294	197	97
Workers (all)	246	130	116
Main workers (total)	246	130	116
Main workers: Cultivators	208	105	103
Main workers: Agricultural labourers	22	13	9
Main workers: Household industry workers	1	1	0
Main workers: Other	15	11	4
Marginal workers (total)	0	0	0
Marginal workers: Cultivators	0	0	0
Marginal workers: Agricultural labourers	0	0	0
Marginal workers: Household industry workers	0	0	0
Marginal workers: Others	0	0	0
Non-workers	186	104	82
