= Bhungiyai =

- village
- Location within Madhya Pradesh Location within India
- Coordinates: 23.4344509°N 77.3008506°E
- Country: India
- State: Madhya Pradesh
- District: Bhopal
- Tehsil: Berasia
- Elevation: 527 m (1,729 ft)

Population (2011)
  - Total: 478
- Time zone: UTC+5:30 (IST)
- ISO 3166 code: MP-IN
- 2011 census code: 482296

Bhungiyai is a village in the Bhopal district of Madhya Pradesh, India. It is located in the Berasia tehsil.

== Demographics ==
According to the 2011 census of India, Bhungiyai has 105 households. The effective literacy rate (i.e. the literacy rate of population excluding children aged 6 and below) is 72.5%.

Demographics (2011 Census)
	Total	Male	Female
Population	478	265	213
Children aged below 6 years	78	41	37
Scheduled caste	81	40	41
Scheduled tribe	0	0	0
Literates	290	191	99
Workers (all)	188	126	62
Main workers (total)	187	125	62
Main workers: Cultivators	59	55	4
Main workers: Agricultural labourers	123	66	57
Main workers: Household industry workers	0	0	0
Main workers: Other	5	4	1
Marginal workers (total)	1	1	0
Marginal workers: Cultivators	1	1	0
Marginal workers: Agricultural labourers	0	0	0
Marginal workers: Household industry workers	0	0	0
Marginal workers: Others	0	0	0
Non-workers	290	139	151
