= Kher Kheda =

- village
- Location within Madhya Pradesh Location within India
- Coordinates: 23.8066348°N 77.3467996°E
- Country: India
- State: Madhya Pradesh
- District: Bhopal
- Tehsil: Berasia
- Elevation: 539 m (1,768 ft)

Population (2011)
  - Total: 227
- Time zone: UTC+5:30 (IST)
- ISO 3166 code: MP-IN
- 2011 census code: 482333

Kher Kheda is a village in the Bhopal district of Madhya Pradesh, India. It is located in the Berasia tehsil.

== Demographics ==
According to the 2011 census of India, Kher Kheda has 44 households. The effective literacy rate (i.e. the literacy rate of population excluding children aged 6 and below) is 30.41%.

Demographics (2011 Census)
	Total	Male	Female
Population	227	123	104
Children aged below 6 years	33	23	10
Scheduled caste	49	29	20
Scheduled tribe	0	0	0
Literates	59	34	25
Workers (all)	151	82	69
Main workers (total)	22	15	7
Main workers: Cultivators	5	3	2
Main workers: Agricultural labourers	16	11	5
Main workers: Household industry workers	0	0	0
Main workers: Other	1	1	0
Marginal workers (total)	129	67	62
Marginal workers: Cultivators	32	20	12
Marginal workers: Agricultural labourers	85	41	44
Marginal workers: Household industry workers	12	6	6
Marginal workers: Others	0	0	0
Non-workers	76	41	35
