= Sukaliya =

- village
- Location within Madhya Pradesh Location within India
- Coordinates: 23.4826916°N 77.4615923°E
- Country: India
- State: Madhya Pradesh
- District: Bhopal
- Tehsil: Berasia
- Elevation: 463 m (1,519 ft)

Population (2011)
  - Total: 1,172
- Time zone: UTC+5:30 (IST)
- ISO 3166 code: MP-IN
- 2011 census code: 482319

Sukaliya is a village in the Bhopal district of Madhya Pradesh, India. It is located in the Berasia tehsil.

== Demographics ==
According to the 2011 census of India, Sukaliya has 277 households. The effective literacy rate (i.e. the literacy rate of population excluding children aged 6 and below) is 72.88%.

Demographics (2011 Census)
	Total	Male	Female
Population	1172	616	556
Children aged below 6 years	191	102	89
Scheduled caste	510	262	248
Scheduled tribe	2	1	1
Literates	715	440	275
Workers (all)	521	294	227
Main workers (total)	161	123	38
Main workers: Cultivators	96	88	8
Main workers: Agricultural labourers	50	28	22
Main workers: Household industry workers	0	0	0
Main workers: Other	15	7	8
Marginal workers (total)	360	171	189
Marginal workers: Cultivators	23	4	19
Marginal workers: Agricultural labourers	286	162	124
Marginal workers: Household industry workers	3	1	2
Marginal workers: Others	48	4	44
Non-workers	651	322	329
