= Gondipura =

- village
- Location within Madhya Pradesh Location within India
- Coordinates: 23.70929541°N 77.3703146°E
- Country: India
- State: Madhya Pradesh
- District: Bhopal
- Tehsil: Berasia
- Elevation: 481 m (1,578 ft)

Population (2011)
  - Total: 1,077
- Time zone: UTC+5:30 (IST)
- ISO 3166 code: MP-IN
- 2011 census code: 482212

Gondipura is a village in the Bhopal district of Madhya Pradesh, India. It is located in the Berasia tehsil.

== Demographics ==
According to the 2011 census of India, Gondipura has 197 households. The effective literacy rate (i.e. the literacy rate of population excluding children aged 6 and below) is 47.63%.

Demographics (2011 Census)
	Total	Male	Female
Population	1077	580	497
Children aged below 6 years	212	118	94
Scheduled caste	63	38	25
Scheduled tribe	0	0	0
Literates	412	252	160
Workers (all)	590	301	289
Main workers (total)	536	286	250
Main workers: Cultivators	228	117	111
Main workers: Agricultural labourers	298	164	134
Main workers: Household industry workers	1	1	0
Main workers: Other	9	4	5
Marginal workers (total)	54	15	39
Marginal workers: Cultivators	23	5	18
Marginal workers: Agricultural labourers	26	8	18
Marginal workers: Household industry workers	4	1	3
Marginal workers: Others	1	1	0
Non-workers	487	279	208
