= Khadampur =

- village
- Location within Madhya Pradesh Location within India
- Coordinates: 23.4827639°N 77.3773025°E
- Country: India
- State: Madhya Pradesh
- District: Bhopal
- Tehsil: Berasia
- Elevation: 492 m (1,614 ft)

Population (2011)
  - Total: 1,118
- Time zone: UTC+5:30 (IST)
- ISO 3166 code: MP-IN
- 2011 census code: 482284

Khadampur is a village in the Bhopal district of Madhya Pradesh, India. It is located in the Berasia tehsil.

== Demographics ==
According to the 2011 census of India, Khadampur has 224 households. The effective literacy rate (i.e. the literacy rate of population excluding children aged 6 and below) is 64.1%.

Demographics (2011 Census)
	Total	Male	Female
Population	1118	591	527
Children aged below 6 years	260	136	124
Scheduled caste	49	27	22
Scheduled tribe	35	22	13
Literates	550	348	202
Workers (all)	418	279	139
Main workers (total)	207	190	17
Main workers: Cultivators	62	58	4
Main workers: Agricultural labourers	49	48	1
Main workers: Household industry workers	1	1	0
Main workers: Other	95	83	12
Marginal workers (total)	211	89	122
Marginal workers: Cultivators	15	1	14
Marginal workers: Agricultural labourers	139	55	84
Marginal workers: Household industry workers	2	1	1
Marginal workers: Others	55	32	23
Non-workers	700	312	388
