= Langarpur =

- village
- Location within Madhya Pradesh Location within India
- Coordinates: 23.5999146°N 77.5361462°E
- Country: India
- State: Madhya Pradesh
- District: Bhopal
- Tehsil: Berasia
- Elevation: 476 m (1,562 ft)

Population (2011)
  - Total: 1,094
- Time zone: UTC+5:30 (IST)
- ISO 3166 code: MP-IN
- 2011 census code: 482265

Langarpur is a village in the Bhopal district of Madhya Pradesh, India. It is located in the Berasia tehsil.

== Demographics ==
According to the 2011 census of India, Langarpur has 222 households. The effective literacy rate (i.e. the literacy rate of population excluding children aged 6 and below) is 68.97%.

Demographics (2011 Census)
	Total	Male	Female
Population	1094	576	518
Children aged below 6 years	182	108	74
Scheduled caste	299	155	144
Scheduled tribe	1	1	0
Literates	629	377	252
Workers (all)	570	300	270
Main workers (total)	518	284	234
Main workers: Cultivators	99	56	43
Main workers: Agricultural labourers	395	211	184
Main workers: Household industry workers	3	2	1
Main workers: Other	21	15	6
Marginal workers (total)	52	16	36
Marginal workers: Cultivators	1	0	1
Marginal workers: Agricultural labourers	45	11	34
Marginal workers: Household industry workers	0	0	0
Marginal workers: Others	6	5	1
Non-workers	524	276	248
