= Ajampur =

- village
- Location within Madhya Pradesh Location within India
- Coordinates: 23.6032072°N 77.4329048°E
- Country: India
- State: Madhya Pradesh
- District: Bhopal
- Tehsil: Berasia
- Elevation: 482 m (1,581 ft)

Population (2011)
  - Total: 244
- Time zone: UTC+5:30 (IST)
- ISO 3166 code: MP-IN
- 2011 census code: 482254

Ajampur is a village in the Bhopal district of Madhya Pradesh, India. It is located in the Berasia tehsil.

== Demographics ==
According to the 2011 census of India, Ajampur has 58 households. The effective literacy rate (i.e. the literacy rate of population excluding children aged 6 and below) is 81.77%.

Demographics (2011 Census)
	Total	Male	Female
Population	244	122	122
Children aged below 6 years	52	26	26
Scheduled caste	7	5	2
Scheduled tribe	0	0	0
Literates	157	84	73
Workers (all)	117	63	54
Main workers (total)	53	51	2
Main workers: Cultivators	10	10	0
Main workers: Agricultural labourers	1	1	0
Main workers: Household industry workers	0	0	0
Main workers: Other	42	40	2
Marginal workers (total)	64	12	52
Marginal workers: Cultivators	3	3	0
Marginal workers: Agricultural labourers	51	0	51
Marginal workers: Household industry workers	0	0	0
Marginal workers: Others	10	9	1
Non-workers	127	59	68
