= Bagraj =

- village
- Location within Madhya Pradesh Location within India
- Coordinates: 23.5114791°N 77.4558554°E
- Country: India
- State: Madhya Pradesh
- District: Bhopal
- Tehsil: Berasia
- Elevation: 484 m (1,588 ft)

Population (2011)
  - Total: 706
- Time zone: UTC+5:30 (IST)
- ISO 3166 code: MP-IN
- 2011 census code: 482313

Bagraj is a village in the Bhopal district of Madhya Pradesh, India. It is located in the Berasia tehsil.

== Demographics ==
According to the 2011 census of India, Bagraj has 149 households. The effective literacy rate (i.e. the literacy rate of population excluding children aged 6 and below) is 58.83%.

Demographics (2011 Census)
	Total	Male	Female
Population	706	366	340
Children aged below 6 years	123	62	61
Scheduled caste	201	106	95
Scheduled tribe	0	0	0
Literates	343	210	133
Workers (all)	149	134	15
Main workers (total)	140	126	14
Main workers: Cultivators	56	54	2
Main workers: Agricultural labourers	78	67	11
Main workers: Household industry workers	0	0	0
Main workers: Other	6	5	1
Marginal workers (total)	9	8	1
Marginal workers: Cultivators	6	6	0
Marginal workers: Agricultural labourers	3	2	1
Marginal workers: Household industry workers	0	0	0
Marginal workers: Others	0	0	0
Non-workers	557	232	325
