= Khandariya =

- village
- Location within Madhya Pradesh Location within India
- Coordinates: 23.8260761°N 77.3697672°E
- Country: India
- State: Madhya Pradesh
- District: Bhopal
- Tehsil: Berasia
- Elevation: 528 m (1,732 ft)

Population (2011)
  - Total: 666
- Time zone: UTC+5:30 (IST)
- ISO 3166 code: MP-IN
- 2011 census code: 482336

Khandariya is a village in the Bhopal district of Madhya Pradesh, India. It is located in the Berasia tehsil.

== Demographics ==
According to the 2011 census of India, Khandariya has 123 households. The effective literacy rate (i.e. the literacy rate of population excluding children aged 6 and below) is 53.17%.

Demographics (2011 Census)
	Total	Male	Female
Population	666	374	292
Children aged below 6 years	145	72	73
Scheduled caste	0	0	0
Scheduled tribe	0	0	0
Literates	277	204	73
Workers (all)	341	195	146
Main workers (total)	321	186	135
Main workers: Cultivators	284	167	117
Main workers: Agricultural labourers	22	9	13
Main workers: Household industry workers	2	1	1
Main workers: Other	13	9	4
Marginal workers (total)	20	9	11
Marginal workers: Cultivators	0	0	0
Marginal workers: Agricultural labourers	19	8	11
Marginal workers: Household industry workers	0	0	0
Marginal workers: Others	1	1	0
Non-workers	325	179	146
