= Rondia =

- village
- Location within Madhya Pradesh Location within India
- Coordinates: 23.5069971°N 77.3295708°E
- Country: India
- State: Madhya Pradesh
- District: Bhopal
- Tehsil: Berasia
- Elevation: 507 m (1,663 ft)

Population (2011)
  - Total: 1,495
- Time zone: UTC+5:30 (IST)
- ISO 3166 code: MP-IN
- 2011 census code: 482287

Rondia is a village in the Bhopal district of Madhya Pradesh, India. It is located in the Berasia tehsil.

== Demographics ==
According to the 2011 census of India, Rondia has 285 households. The effective literacy rate (i.e. the literacy rate of population excluding children aged 6 and below) is 76.85%.

Demographics (2011 Census)
	Total	Male	Female
Population	1495	785	710
Children aged below 6 years	251	124	127
Scheduled caste	373	209	164
Scheduled tribe	11	2	9
Literates	956	577	379
Workers (all)	652	418	234
Main workers (total)	514	342	172
Main workers: Cultivators	222	152	70
Main workers: Agricultural labourers	231	142	89
Main workers: Household industry workers	7	5	2
Main workers: Other	54	43	11
Marginal workers (total)	138	76	62
Marginal workers: Cultivators	25	4	21
Marginal workers: Agricultural labourers	110	71	39
Marginal workers: Household industry workers	0	0	0
Marginal workers: Others	3	1	2
Non-workers	843	367	476
