= Rusalli =

- village
- Location within Madhya Pradesh Location within India
- Coordinates: 23.48891107°N 77.39820957°E
- Country: India
- State: Madhya Pradesh
- District: Bhopal
- Tehsil: Berasia
- Elevation: 487 m (1,598 ft)

Population (2011)
  - Total: 944
- Time zone: UTC+5:30 (IST)
- ISO 3166 code: MP-IN
- 2011 census code: 482283

Rusalli is a village in the Bhopal district of Madhya Pradesh, India. It is located in the Berasia tehsil.

== Demographics ==
According to the 2011 census of India, Rusalli has 187 households. The effective literacy rate (i.e. the literacy rate of population excluding children aged 6 and below) is 73.73%.

Demographics (2011 Census)
	Total	Male	Female
Population	944	494	450
Children aged below 6 years	194	114	80
Scheduled caste	37	23	14
Scheduled tribe	0	0	0
Literates	553	333	220
Workers (all)	272	214	58
Main workers (total)	254	204	50
Main workers: Cultivators	54	48	6
Main workers: Agricultural labourers	173	133	40
Main workers: Household industry workers	7	7	0
Main workers: Other	20	16	4
Marginal workers (total)	18	10	8
Marginal workers: Cultivators	5	3	2
Marginal workers: Agricultural labourers	12	6	6
Marginal workers: Household industry workers	1	1	0
Marginal workers: Others	0	0	0
Non-workers	672	280	392
