= Khejra Kamal =

- village
- Location within Madhya Pradesh Location within India
- Coordinates: 23.642237°N 77.544545°E
- Country: India
- State: Madhya Pradesh
- District: Bhopal
- Tehsil: Berasia

Population (2011)
  - Total: 211
- Time zone: UTC+5:30 (IST)
- ISO 3166 code: MP-IN
- Census code: 482195

Khejra Kamal is a village in the Bhopal district of Madhya Pradesh, India. It is located in the Berasia tehsil, on the Berasia-Vidisha road.

== Demographics ==
According to the 2011 census of India, Khejra Kamal has 37 households. The effective literacy rate (i.e. the literacy rate of population excluding children aged 6 and below) is 58.18%.

Demographics (2011 Census)
	Total	Male	Female
Population	211	109	102
Children aged below 6 years	46	28	18
Scheduled caste	27	17	10
Scheduled tribe	0	0	0
Literates	96	49	47
Workers (all)	103	56	47
Main workers (total)	58	47	11
Main workers: Cultivators	9	7	2
Main workers: Agricultural labourers	47	38	9
Main workers: Household industry workers	0	0	0
Main workers: Other	2	2	0
Marginal workers (total)	45	9	36
Marginal workers: Cultivators	6	1	5
Marginal workers: Agricultural labourers	39	8	31
Marginal workers: Household industry workers	0	0	0
Marginal workers: Others	0	0	0
Non-workers	108	53	55
