= Ramaha =

- village
- Location within Madhya Pradesh Location within India
- Coordinates: 23.8225587°N 77.2922332°E
- Country: India
- State: Madhya Pradesh
- District: Bhopal
- Tehsil: Berasia
- Elevation: 450 m (1,480 ft)

Population (2011)
  - Total: 938
- Time zone: UTC+5:30 (IST)
- ISO 3166 code: MP-IN
- 2011 census code: 482329

Ramaha is a village in the Bhopal district of Madhya Pradesh, India. It is located in the Berasia tehsil.

== Demographics ==
According to the 2011 census of India, Ramaha has 193 households. The effective literacy rate (i.e. the literacy rate of population excluding children aged 6 and below) is 48.12%.

Demographics (2011 census)
	Total	Male	Female
Population	938	501	437
Children aged below 6 years	192	104	88
Scheduled caste	512	278	234
Scheduled tribe	0	0	0
Literates	359	216	143
Workers (all)	482	254	228
Main workers (total)	10	7	3
Main workers: Cultivators	9	7	2
Main workers: Agricultural labourers	1	0	1
Main workers: Household industry workers	0	0	0
Main workers: Other	0	0	0
Marginal workers (total)	472	247	225
Marginal workers: Cultivators	0	0	0
Marginal workers: Agricultural labourers	471	247	224
Marginal workers: Household industry workers	1	0	1
Marginal workers: Others	0	0	0
Non-workers	456	247	209
