= Richhai =

- Village
- Location within Madhya Pradesh Location within India
- Coordinates: 23.6454493°N 77.3065952°E
- Country: India
- State: Madhya Pradesh
- District: Bhopal
- Tehsil: Berasia
- Elevation: 486 m (1,594 ft)

Population (2011)
  - Total: 243
- Time zone: UTC+5:30 (IST)
- ISO 3166 code: MP-IN
- 2011 census code: 482342

Richhai is a village in the Bhopal district of Madhya Pradesh, India. It is located in the Berasia tehsil.

== Demographics ==
According to the 2011 census of India, Richhai has 48 households. The effective literacy rate (i.e. the literacy rate of population excluding children aged 6 and below) is 41.5%.

Demographics (2011 Census)
	Total	Male	Female
Population	243	120	123
Children aged below 6 years	43	18	25
Scheduled caste	50	21	29
Scheduled tribe	0	0	0
Literates	83	48	35
Workers (all)	118	63	55
Main workers (total)	36	23	13
Main workers: Cultivators	16	12	4
Main workers: Agricultural labourers	18	9	9
Main workers: Household industry workers	0	0	0
Main workers: Other	2	2	0
Marginal workers (total)	82	40	42
Marginal workers: Cultivators	4	3	1
Marginal workers: Agricultural labourers	78	37	41
Marginal workers: Household industry workers	0	0	0
Marginal workers: Others	0	0	0
Non-workers	125	57	68
