= Chataua =

- village
- Location within Madhya Pradesh Location within India
- Coordinates: 23.5678673°N 77.5017428°E
- Country: India
- State: Madhya Pradesh
- District: Bhopal
- Tehsil: Berasia
- Elevation: 477 m (1,565 ft)

Population (2011)
  - Total: 694
- Time zone: UTC+5:30 (IST)
- ISO 3166 code: MP-IN
- 2011 census code: 482272

Chataua is a village in the Bhopal district of Madhya Pradesh, India. It is located in the Berasia tehsil.

== Demographics ==
According to the 2011 census of India, Chataua has 173 households. The effective literacy rate (i.e. the literacy rate of population excluding children aged 6 and below) is 71.97%.

Demographics (2011 Census)
	Total	Male	Female
Population	694	338	356
Children aged below 6 years	91	40	51
Scheduled caste	182	88	94
Scheduled tribe	0	0	0
Literates	434	249	185
Workers (all)	340	175	165
Main workers (total)	119	99	20
Main workers: Cultivators	75	70	5
Main workers: Agricultural labourers	29	19	10
Main workers: Household industry workers	0	0	0
Main workers: Other	15	10	5
Marginal workers (total)	221	76	145
Marginal workers: Cultivators	35	29	6
Marginal workers: Agricultural labourers	179	43	136
Marginal workers: Household industry workers	1	0	1
Marginal workers: Others	6	4	2
Non-workers	354	163	191
