= Ganga Khedi =

- village
- Location within Madhya Pradesh Location within India
- Coordinates: 23.675265°N 77.415721°E
- Country: India
- State: Madhya Pradesh
- District: Bhopal
- Tehsil: Berasia

Population (2011)
  - Total: 336
- Time zone: UTC+5:30 (IST)
- ISO 3166 code: MP-IN
- Census code: 482209

Ganga Khedi is a village in the Bhopal district of Madhya Pradesh, India. It is located in the Berasia tehsil, on the banks of the Baanh River.

== Demographics ==
According to the 2011 census of India, Ganga Khedi has 64 households. The effective literacy rate (i.e. the literacy rate of population excluding children aged 6 and below) is 44.74%.

Demographics (2011 Census)
	Total	Male	Female
Population	336	182	154
Children aged below 6 years	70	36	34
Scheduled caste	77	40	37
Scheduled tribe	0	0	0
Literates	119	76	43
Workers (all)	147	90	57
Main workers (total)	105	84	21
Main workers: Cultivators	72	58	14
Main workers: Agricultural labourers	29	25	4
Main workers: Household industry workers	3	1	2
Main workers: Other	1	0	1
Marginal workers (total)	42	6	36
Marginal workers: Cultivators	13	2	11
Marginal workers: Agricultural labourers	29	4	25
Marginal workers: Household industry workers	0	0	0
Marginal workers: Others	0	0	0
Non-workers	189	92	97
