= Khedli =

- village
- Location within Madhya Pradesh Location within India
- Coordinates: 23.8791821°N 77.3317246°E
- Country: India
- State: Madhya Pradesh
- District: Bhopal
- Tehsil: Berasia
- Elevation: 454 m (1,490 ft)

Population (2011)
  - Total: 742
- Time zone: UTC+5:30 (IST)
- ISO 3166 code: MP-IN
- 2011 census code: 482344

Khedli is a village in the Bhopal district of Madhya Pradesh, India. It is located in the Berasia tehsil.

== Demographics ==
According to the 2011 census of India, Khedli has 138 households. The effective literacy rate (i.e. the literacy rate of population excluding children aged 6 and below) is 72.68%.

Demographics (2011 Census)
	Total	Male	Female
Population	742	408	334
Children aged below 6 years	127	65	62
Scheduled caste	450	247	203
Scheduled tribe	32	18	14
Literates	447	286	161
Workers (all)	231	177	54
Main workers (total)	27	22	5
Main workers: Cultivators	0	0	0
Main workers: Agricultural labourers	2	2	0
Main workers: Household industry workers	7	5	2
Main workers: Other	18	15	3
Marginal workers (total)	204	155	49
Marginal workers: Cultivators	74	59	15
Marginal workers: Agricultural labourers	122	91	31
Marginal workers: Household industry workers	0	0	0
Marginal workers: Others	8	5	3
Non-workers	511	231	280
