= Thikariya Laxmanpur =

- village
- Location within Madhya Pradesh Location within India
- Coordinates: 23.686052°N 77.211943°E
- Country: India
- State: Madhya Pradesh
- District: Bhopal
- Tehsil: Berasia

Population (2011)
  - Total: 179
- Time zone: UTC+5:30 (IST)
- ISO 3166 code: MP-IN
- Census code: 482090

Thikariya Laxmanpur is a village in the Bhopal district of Madhya Pradesh, India. It is located in the Berasia tehsil.

== Demographics ==
According to the 2011 census of India, Thikariya Laxmanpur has 39 households. The effective literacy rate (i.e. the literacy rate of population excluding children aged 6 and below) is 47.68%.

Demographics (2011 Census)
	Total	Male	Female
Population	179	94	85
Children aged below 6 years	28	9	19
Scheduled caste	33	15	18
Scheduled tribe	0	0	0
Literates	72	44	28
Workers (all)	94	53	41
Main workers (total)	50	48	2
Main workers: Cultivators	41	39	2
Main workers: Agricultural labourers	9	9	0
Main workers: Household industry workers	0	0	0
Main workers: Other	0	0	0
Marginal workers (total)	44	5	39
Marginal workers: Cultivators	33	2	31
Marginal workers: Agricultural labourers	10	2	8
Marginal workers: Household industry workers	0	0	0
Marginal workers: Others	1	1	0
Non-workers	85	41	44
