= Daknai =

- village
- Location within Madhya Pradesh Location within India
- Coordinates: 23.648771°N 77.3467996°E
- Country: India
- State: Madhya Pradesh
- District: Bhopal
- Tehsil: Berasia
- Elevation: 491 m (1,611 ft)

Population (2011)
  - Total: 18
- Time zone: UTC+5:30 (IST)
- ISO 3166 code: MP-IN
- 2011 census code: 482224

Daknai is a village in the Bhopal district of Madhya Pradesh, India. It is located in the Berasia tehsil.

== Demographics ==
According to the 2011 census of India, Daknai has 2 households. The effective literacy rate (i.e. the literacy rate of population excluding children aged 6 and below) is 71.43%.

Demographics (2011 Census)
	Total	Male	Female
Population	18	8	10
Children aged below 6 years	4	3	1
Scheduled caste	0	0	0
Scheduled tribe	0	0	0
Literates	10	4	6
Workers (all)	5	5	0
Main workers (total)	5	5	0
Main workers: Cultivators	1	1	0
Main workers: Agricultural labourers	4	4	0
Main workers: Household industry workers	0	0	0
Main workers: Other	0	0	0
Marginal workers (total)	0	0	0
Marginal workers: Cultivators	0	0	0
Marginal workers: Agricultural labourers	0	0	0
Marginal workers: Household industry workers	0	0	0
Marginal workers: Others	0	0	0
Non-workers	13	3	10
