= Dhaturiya, Bhopal =

Dhaturiya
- village
- Location within Madhya Pradesh Location within India
- Coordinates: 23.754214°N 77.574892°E
- Country: India
- State: Madhya Pradesh
- District: Bhopal
- Tehsil: Berasia

Population (2011)
  - Total: 851
- Time zone: UTC+5:30 (IST)
- ISO 3166 code: MP-IN
- Census code: 482166

Dhaturiya is a village in the Bhopal district of Madhya Pradesh, India. It is located in the Berasia tehsil.

== Demographics ==
According to the 2011 census of India, Dhaturiya has 206 households. The effective literacy rate (i.e. the literacy rate of population excluding children aged 6 and below) is 56.16%.

Demographics (2011 Census)
	Total	Male	Female
Population	851	456	395
Children aged below 6 years	153	74	79
Scheduled caste	486	260	226
Scheduled tribe	0	0	0
Literates	392	269	123
Workers (all)	361	257	104
Main workers (total)	175	162	13
Main workers: Cultivators	15	14	1
Main workers: Agricultural labourers	146	137	9
Main workers: Household industry workers	0	0	0
Main workers: Other	14	11	3
Marginal workers (total)	186	95	91
Marginal workers: Cultivators	6	5	1
Marginal workers: Agricultural labourers	180	90	90
Marginal workers: Household industry workers	0	0	0
Marginal workers: Others	0	0	0
Non-workers	490	199	291
