= Arrai Sardar Singh =

- village
- Location within Madhya Pradesh Location within India
- Coordinates: 23.693937°N 77.537682°E
- Country: India
- State: Madhya Pradesh
- District: Bhopal
- Tehsil: Berasia

Population (2011)
  - Total: 284
- Time zone: UTC+5:30 (IST)
- ISO 3166 code: MP-IN
- Census code: 482185

Arrai Sardar Singh is a village in the Bhopal district of Madhya Pradesh, India. It is located in the Berasia tehsil.

== Demographics ==
According to the 2011 census of India, Arrai Sardar Singh has 59 households. The effective literacy rate (i.e. the literacy rate of population excluding children aged 6 and below) is 61.11%.

Demographics (2011 Census)
	Total	Male	Female
Population	284	157	127
Children aged below 6 years	50	30	20
Scheduled caste	100	55	45
Scheduled tribe	0	0	0
Literates	143	88	55
Workers (all)	112	77	35
Main workers (total)	106	75	31
Main workers: Cultivators	14	12	2
Main workers: Agricultural labourers	87	59	28
Main workers: Household industry workers	0	0	0
Main workers: Other	5	4	1
Marginal workers (total)	6	2	4
Marginal workers: Cultivators	0	0	0
Marginal workers: Agricultural labourers	6	2	4
Marginal workers: Household industry workers	0	0	0
Marginal workers: Others	0	0	0
Non-workers	172	80	92
