= Amarpur, Bhopal =

Amarpur
- village
- Location within Madhya Pradesh Location within India
- Coordinates: 23.761064°N 77.206025°E
- Country: India
- State: Madhya Pradesh
- District: Bhopal
- Tehsil: Berasia

Population (2011)
  - Total: 1,092
- Time zone: UTC+5:30 (IST)
- ISO 3166 code: MP-IN
- Census code: 482074

Amarpur is a village in the Bhopal district of Madhya Pradesh, India. It is located in the Berasia tehsil.

== Demographics ==
According to the 2011 census of India, Amarpur has 223 households. The effective literacy rate (i.e. the literacy rate of population excluding children aged 6 and below) is 51.73%.

Demographics (2011 Census)
	Total	Male	Female
Population	1092	576	516
Children aged below 6 years	195	109	86
Scheduled caste	200	103	97
Scheduled tribe	0	0	0
Literates	464	298	166
Workers (all)	689	358	331
Main workers (total)	125	101	24
Main workers: Cultivators	86	80	6
Main workers: Agricultural labourers	28	14	14
Main workers: Household industry workers	1	1	0
Main workers: Other	10	6	4
Marginal workers (total)	564	257	307
Marginal workers: Cultivators	139	68	71
Marginal workers: Agricultural labourers	417	183	234
Marginal workers: Household industry workers	1	1	0
Marginal workers: Others	7	5	2
Non-workers	403	218	185
