= Barkheda Yakub =

- village
- Location within Madhya Pradesh Location within India
- Coordinates: 23.711647°N 77.582085°E
- Country: India
- State: Madhya Pradesh
- District: Bhopal
- Tehsil: Berasia

Population (2011)
  - Total: 1,297
- Time zone: UTC+5:30 (IST)
- ISO 3166 code: MP-IN
- Census code: 482189

Barkheda Yakub is a village in the Bhopal district of Madhya Pradesh, India. It is located in the Berasia tehsil.

== Demographics ==
According to the 2011 census of India, Barkheda Yakub has 259 households. The effective literacy rate (i.e. the literacy rate of population excluding children aged 6 and below) is 72.65%.

Demographics (2011 Census)
	Total	Male	Female
Population	1297	699	598
Children aged below 6 years	182	96	86
Scheduled caste	538	285	253
Scheduled tribe	0	0	0
Literates	810	481	329
Workers (all)	678	364	314
Main workers (total)	329	264	65
Main workers: Cultivators	195	182	13
Main workers: Agricultural labourers	71	44	27
Main workers: Household industry workers	36	17	19
Main workers: Other	27	21	6
Marginal workers (total)	349	100	249
Marginal workers: Cultivators	9	6	3
Marginal workers: Agricultural labourers	303	79	224
Marginal workers: Household industry workers	17	6	11
Marginal workers: Others	20	9	11
Non-workers	619	335	284
