= Chatahedi =

- village
- Location within Madhya Pradesh Location within India
- Coordinates: 23.687486°N 77.413771°E
- Country: India
- State: Madhya Pradesh
- District: Bhopal
- Tehsil: Berasia

Population (2011)
  - Total: 1,093
- Time zone: UTC+5:30 (IST)
- ISO 3166 code: MP-IN
- Census code: 482207

Chatahedi is a village in the Bhopal district of Madhya Pradesh, India. It is located in the Berasia tehsil, beside the Baanh River.

== Demographics ==
According to the 2011 census of India, Chatahedi has 245 households. The effective literacy rate (i.e. the literacy rate of population excluding children aged 6 and below) is 70.34%.

Demographics (2011 Census)
	Total	Male	Female
Population	1093	591	502
Children aged below 6 years	223	113	110
Scheduled caste	265	159	106
Scheduled tribe	15	6	9
Literates	612	398	214
Workers (all)	526	293	233
Main workers (total)	273	188	85
Main workers: Cultivators	212	148	64
Main workers: Agricultural labourers	51	33	18
Main workers: Household industry workers	1	0	1
Main workers: Other	9	7	2
Marginal workers (total)	253	105	148
Marginal workers: Cultivators	58	12	46
Marginal workers: Agricultural labourers	191	90	101
Marginal workers: Household industry workers	1	0	1
Marginal workers: Others	3	3	0
Non-workers	567	298	269
