= Hinotiya Ghat =

- village
- Location within Madhya Pradesh Location within India
- Coordinates: 23.759822°N 77.503666°E
- Country: India
- State: Madhya Pradesh
- District: Bhopal
- Tehsil: Berasia

Population (2011)
  - Total: 526
- Time zone: UTC+5:30 (IST)
- ISO 3166 code: MP-IN
- Census code: 482159

Hinotiya Ghat is a village in the Bhopal district of Madhya Pradesh, India. It is located in the Berasia tehsil.

== Demographics ==
According to the 2011 census of India, Hinotiya Ghat has 104 households. The effective literacy rate (i.e. the literacy rate of population excluding children aged 6 and below) is 57.55%.

Demographics (2011 Census)
	Total	Male	Female
Population	526	290	236
Children aged below 6 years	109	63	46
Scheduled caste	25	13	12
Scheduled tribe	71	47	24
Literates	240	160	80
Workers (all)	215	133	82
Main workers (total)	128	119	9
Main workers: Cultivators	79	77	2
Main workers: Agricultural labourers	43	36	7
Main workers: Household industry workers	0	0	0
Main workers: Other	6	6	0
Marginal workers (total)	87	14	73
Marginal workers: Cultivators	1	0	1
Marginal workers: Agricultural labourers	81	13	68
Marginal workers: Household industry workers	3	0	3
Marginal workers: Others	2	1	1
Non-workers	311	157	154
