= Jamusar Khurd =

- village
- Location within Madhya Pradesh Location within India
- Coordinates: 23.707730°N 77.476513°E
- Country: India
- State: Madhya Pradesh
- District: Bhopal
- Tehsil: Berasia

Population (2011)
  - Total: 1,364
- Time zone: UTC+5:30 (IST)
- ISO 3166 code: MP-IN
- Census code: 482155

Jamusar Khurd is a village in the Bhopal district of Madhya Pradesh, India. It is located in the Berasia tehsil.

== Demographics ==
According to the 2011 census of India, Jamusar Khurd has 285 households. The effective literacy rate (i.e. the literacy rate of population excluding children aged 6 and below) is 70.46%.

Demographics (2011 Census)
	Total	Male	Female
Population	1364	724	640
Children aged below 6 years	247	129	118
Scheduled caste	234	117	117
Scheduled tribe	0	0	0
Literates	787	486	301
Workers (all)	659	379	280
Main workers (total)	327	301	26
Main workers: Cultivators	221	214	7
Main workers: Agricultural labourers	59	47	12
Main workers: Household industry workers	4	3	1
Main workers: Other	43	37	6
Marginal workers (total)	332	78	254
Marginal workers: Cultivators	86	17	69
Marginal workers: Agricultural labourers	111	50	61
Marginal workers: Household industry workers	13	1	12
Marginal workers: Others	122	10	112
Non-workers	705	345	360
