= Kadaiya Khurd =

- village
- Location within Madhya Pradesh Location within India
- Coordinates: 23.690138°N 77.254599°E
- Country: India
- State: Madhya Pradesh
- District: Bhopal
- Tehsil: Berasia

Population (2011)
  - Total: 308
- Time zone: UTC+5:30 (IST)
- ISO 3166 code: MP-IN
- Census code: 482100

Kadaiya Khurd is a village in the Bhopal district of Madhya Pradesh, India. It is located in the Berasia tehsil.

== Demographics ==
According to the 2011 census of India, Kadaiya Khurd has 62 households. The effective literacy rate (i.e. the literacy rate of population excluding children aged 6 and below) is 45.38%.

Demographics (2011 Census)
	Total	Male	Female
Population	308	175	133
Children aged below 6 years	48	34	14
Scheduled caste	0	0	0
Scheduled tribe	0	0	0
Literates	118	74	44
Workers (all)	179	98	81
Main workers (total)	90	79	11
Main workers: Cultivators	86	75	11
Main workers: Agricultural labourers	0	0	0
Main workers: Household industry workers	0	0	0
Main workers: Other	4	4	0
Marginal workers (total)	89	19	70
Marginal workers: Cultivators	81	13	68
Marginal workers: Agricultural labourers	8	6	2
Marginal workers: Household industry workers	0	0	0
Marginal workers: Others	0	0	0
Non-workers	129	77	52
