= Kadaiya Kota =

- village
- Location within Madhya Pradesh Location within India
- Coordinates: 23.771596°N 77.344898°E
- Country: India
- State: Madhya Pradesh
- District: Bhopal
- Tehsil: Berasia

Population (2011)
  - Total: 1,366
- Time zone: UTC+5:30 (IST)
- ISO 3166 code: MP-IN
- Census code: 482072

Kadaiya Kota is a village in the Bhopal district of Madhya Pradesh, India. It is located in the Berasia tehsil.

== Demographics ==
According to the 2011 census of India, Kadaiya Kota has 265 households. The effective literacy rate (i.e. the literacy rate of population excluding children aged 6 and below) is 55.26%.

Demographics (2011 Census)
	Total	Male	Female
Population	1366	719	647
Children aged below 6 years	235	116	119
Scheduled caste	416	226	190
Scheduled tribe	0	0	0
Literates	625	387	238
Workers (all)	706	409	297
Main workers (total)	524	352	172
Main workers: Cultivators	273	176	97
Main workers: Agricultural labourers	231	160	71
Main workers: Household industry workers	7	5	2
Main workers: Other	13	11	2
Marginal workers (total)	182	57	125
Marginal workers: Cultivators	15	7	8
Marginal workers: Agricultural labourers	162	48	114
Marginal workers: Household industry workers	1	0	1
Marginal workers: Others	4	2	2
Non-workers	660	310	350
