= Runaha =

- village
- Location within Madhya Pradesh Location within India
- Coordinates: 23.713256°N 77.250794°E
- Country: India
- State: Madhya Pradesh
- District: Bhopal
- Tehsil: Berasia

Population (2011)
  - Total: 3,082
- Time zone: UTC+5:30 (IST)
- PIN: 462420
- ISO 3166 code: MP-IN
- Census code: 482077

Runaha is a village in the Bhopal district of Madhya Pradesh, India. It is located in the Berasia tehsil.

== Demographics ==
According to the 2011 census of India, Runaha has 610 households. The effective literacy rate (i.e. the literacy rate of population excluding children aged 6 and below) is 69.64%.

Demographics (2011 Census)
	Total	Male	Female
Population	3082	1596	1486
Children aged below 6 years	539	278	261
Scheduled caste	412	209	203
Scheduled tribe	81	38	43
Literates	1771	1049	722
Workers (all)	1410	831	579
Main workers (total)	880	622	258
Main workers: Cultivators	289	228	61
Main workers: Agricultural labourers	363	206	157
Main workers: Household industry workers	25	13	12
Main workers: Other	203	175	28
Marginal workers (total)	530	209	321
Marginal workers: Cultivators	174	36	138
Marginal workers: Agricultural labourers	307	137	170
Marginal workers: Household industry workers	12	6	6
Marginal workers: Others	37	30	7
Non-workers	1672	765	907
