= Badbeli Khurd =

- village
- Location within Madhya Pradesh Location within India
- Coordinates: 23.781663°N 77.404949°E
- Country: India
- State: Madhya Pradesh
- District: Bhopal
- Tehsil: Berasia

Population (2011)
  - Total: 392
- Time zone: UTC+5:30 (IST)
- ISO 3166 code: MP-IN
- Census code: 482143

Badbeli Khurd is a village in the Bhopal district of Madhya Pradesh, India. It is located in the Berasia tehsil.

== Demographics ==
According to the 2011 census of India, Badbeli Khurd has 70 households. The effective literacy rate (i.e. the literacy rate of population excluding children aged 6 and below) is 67.89%.

Demographics (2011 Census)
	Total	Male	Female
Population	392	198	194
Children aged below 6 years	65	29	36
Scheduled caste	0	0	0
Scheduled tribe	0	0	0
Literates	222	123	99
Workers (all)	207	115	92
Main workers (total)	186	106	80
Main workers: Cultivators	0	0	0
Main workers: Agricultural labourers	185	105	80
Main workers: Household industry workers	0	0	0
Main workers: Other	1	1	0
Marginal workers (total)	21	9	12
Marginal workers: Cultivators	0	0	0
Marginal workers: Agricultural labourers	21	9	12
Marginal workers: Household industry workers	0	0	0
Marginal workers: Others	0	0	0
Non-workers	185	83	102
