= Hinotiya Piran =

- village
- Location within Madhya Pradesh Location within India
- Coordinates: 23.709788°N 77.502164°E
- Country: India
- State: Madhya Pradesh
- District: Bhopal
- Tehsil: Berasia

Population (2011)
  - Total: 800
- Time zone: UTC+5:30 (IST)
- ISO 3166 code: MP-IN
- Census code: 482157

Hinotiya Piran is a village in the Bhopal district of Madhya Pradesh, India. It is located in the Berasia tehsil.

== Demographics ==
According to the 2011 census of India, Hinotiya Piran has 138 households. The effective literacy rate (i.e. the literacy rate of population excluding children aged 6 and below) is 53.44%.

Demographics (2011 Census)
	Total	Male	Female
Population	709	354	355
Children aged below 6 years	157	79	78
Scheduled caste	518	256	262
Scheduled tribe	0	0	0
Literates	295	181	114
Workers (all)	325	189	136
Main workers (total)	268	154	114
Main workers: Cultivators	28	28	0
Main workers: Agricultural labourers	239	125	114
Main workers: Household industry workers	0	0	0
Main workers: Other	1	1	0
Marginal workers (total)	57	35	22
Marginal workers: Cultivators	3	1	2
Marginal workers: Agricultural labourers	49	33	16
Marginal workers: Household industry workers	3	1	2
Marginal workers: Others	2	0	2
Non-workers	384	165	219
