= Kadaia Brahman =

- village
- Location within Madhya Pradesh Location within India
- Coordinates: 23.720592°N 77.294964°E
- Country: India
- State: Madhya Pradesh
- District: Bhopal
- Tehsil: Berasia

Population (2011)
  - Total: 229
- Time zone: UTC+5:30 (IST)
- ISO 3166 code: MP-IN
- Census code: 482121

Kadaia Brahman is a village in the Bhopal district of Madhya Pradesh, India. It is located in the Berasia tehsil.

== Demographics ==
According to the 2011 census of India, Kadaia Brahman has 51 households. The effective literacy rate (i.e. the literacy rate of population excluding children aged 6 and below) is 53.47%.

Demographics (2011 Census)
	Total	Male	Female
Population	229	128	101
Children aged below 6 years	27	11	16
Scheduled caste	6	4	2
Scheduled tribe	0	0	0
Literates	108	73	35
Workers (all)	115	69	46
Main workers (total)	60	57	3
Main workers: Cultivators	48	45	3
Main workers: Agricultural labourers	0	0	0
Main workers: Household industry workers	3	3	0
Main workers: Other	9	9	0
Marginal workers (total)	55	12	43
Marginal workers: Cultivators	41	5	36
Marginal workers: Agricultural labourers	3	1	2
Marginal workers: Household industry workers	0	0	0
Marginal workers: Others	11	6	5
Non-workers	114	59	55
