= Karanpura, Bhopal =

Karanpura
- village
- Location within Madhya Pradesh Location within India
- Coordinates: 23.602991°N 77.308721°E
- Country: India
- State: Madhya Pradesh
- District: Bhopal
- Tehsil: Berasia

Population (2011)
  - Total: 425
- Time zone: UTC+5:30 (IST)
- ISO 3166 code: MP-IN
- Census code: 482114

Karanpura is a village in the Bhopal district of Madhya Pradesh, India. It is located in the Berasia tehsil.

== Demographics ==
According to the 2011 census of India, Karanpura has 92 households. The effective literacy rate (i.e. the literacy rate of population excluding children aged 6 and below) is 72.08%.

Demographics (2011 Census)
	Total	Male	Female
Population	425	228	197
Children aged below 6 years	74	38	36
Scheduled caste	78	44	34
Scheduled tribe	0	0	0
Literates	253	144	109
Workers (all)	128	105	23
Main workers (total)	88	75	13
Main workers: Cultivators	62	52	10
Main workers: Agricultural labourers	17	16	1
Main workers: Household industry workers	1	1	0
Main workers: Other	8	6	2
Marginal workers (total)	40	30	10
Marginal workers: Cultivators	7	3	4
Marginal workers: Agricultural labourers	29	23	6
Marginal workers: Household industry workers	0	0	0
Marginal workers: Others	4	4	0
Non-workers	297	123	174
