= Latifpur, Bhopal =

Latifpur
- village
- Location within Madhya Pradesh Location within India
- Coordinates: 23.642600°N 77.564975°E
- Country: India
- State: Madhya Pradesh
- District: Bhopal
- Tehsil: Berasia

Population (2011)
  - Total: 425
- Time zone: UTC+5:30 (IST)
- ISO 3166 code: MP-IN
- Census code: 482179

Latifpur is a village in the Bhopal district of Madhya Pradesh, India. It is located in the Berasia tehsil.

== Demographics ==
According to the 2011 census of India, Latifpur has 85 households. The effective literacy rate (i.e. the literacy rate of population excluding children aged 6 and below) is 63.61%.

Demographics (2011 Census)
	Total	Male	Female
Population	425	228	197
Children aged below 6 years	76	43	33
Scheduled caste	107	60	47
Scheduled tribe	0	0	0
Literates	222	133	89
Workers (all)	169	115	54
Main workers (total)	134	107	27
Main workers: Cultivators	37	36	1
Main workers: Agricultural labourers	91	68	23
Main workers: Household industry workers	2	1	1
Main workers: Other	4	2	2
Marginal workers (total)	35	8	27
Marginal workers: Cultivators	2	0	2
Marginal workers: Agricultural labourers	33	8	25
Marginal workers: Household industry workers	0	0	0
Marginal workers: Others	0	0	0
Non-workers	256	113	143
