= Mithi Chhapri =

- village
- Location within Madhya Pradesh Location within India
- Coordinates: 23.636106°N 77.242954°E
- Country: India
- State: Madhya Pradesh
- District: Bhopal
- Tehsil: Berasia

Population (2011)
  - Total: 432
- Time zone: UTC+5:30 (IST)
- ISO 3166 code: MP-IN
- Census code: 482105

Mithi Chhapri is a village in the Bhopal district of Madhya Pradesh, India. It is located in the Berasia tehsil.

== Demographics ==
According to the 2011 census of India, Mithi Chhapri has 93 households. The effective literacy rate (i.e. the literacy rate of population excluding children aged 6 and below) is 58.76%.

Demographics (2011 Census)
	Total	Male	Female
Population	432	235	197
Children aged below 6 years	78	40	38
Scheduled caste	73	34	39
Scheduled tribe	0	0	0
Literates	208	139	69
Workers (all)	224	123	101
Main workers (total)	208	116	92
Main workers: Cultivators	148	82	66
Main workers: Agricultural labourers	56	31	25
Main workers: Household industry workers	0	0	0
Main workers: Other	4	3	1
Marginal workers (total)	16	7	9
Marginal workers: Cultivators	2	0	2
Marginal workers: Agricultural labourers	12	6	6
Marginal workers: Household industry workers	0	0	0
Marginal workers: Others	2	1	1
Non-workers	208	112	96
