= Vichhnai =

- village
- Location within Madhya Pradesh Location within India
- Coordinates: 23.762980°N 77.571544°E
- Country: India
- State: Madhya Pradesh
- District: Bhopal
- Tehsil: Berasia

Population (2011)
  - Total: 104
- Time zone: UTC+5:30 (IST)
- PIN: 463111
- ISO 3166 code: MP-IN
- Census code: 482165

Vichhnai is a village in the Bhopal district of Madhya Pradesh, India. It is located in the Berasia tehsil.

== Demographics ==
According to the 2011 census of India, Vichhnai has 21 households. The effective literacy rate (i.e. the literacy rate of population excluding children aged 6 and below) is 66.67%.

Demographics (2011 Census)
	Total	Male	Female
Population	104	55	49
Children aged below 6 years	20	9	11
Scheduled caste	28	13	15
Scheduled tribe	34	18	16
Literates	56	36	20
Workers (all)	47	29	18
Main workers (total)	8	8	0
Main workers: Cultivators	4	4	0
Main workers: Agricultural labourers	3	3	0
Main workers: Household industry workers	0	0	0
Main workers: Other	1	1	0
Marginal workers (total)	39	21	18
Marginal workers: Cultivators	1	1	0
Marginal workers: Agricultural labourers	38	20	18
Marginal workers: Household industry workers	0	0	0
Marginal workers: Others	0	0	0
Non-workers	57	26	31
