= Laharpur, Berasia =

Laharpur
- village
- Location within Madhya Pradesh Location within India
- Coordinates: 23.704849°N 77.639071°E
- Country: India
- State: Madhya Pradesh
- District: Bhopal
- Tehsil: Berasia

Population (2011)
  - Total: 523
- Time zone: UTC+5:30 (IST)
- ISO 3166 code: IN-MP
- Census code: 482174

Laharpur is a village in the Bhopal district of Madhya Pradesh, India. It is located in the Berasia tehsil.

== Demographics ==
According to the 2011 census of India, Laharpur has 107 households. The effective literacy rate (i.e. the literacy rate of population excluding children aged 6 and below) is 65.86%.

Demographics (2011 Census)
	Total	Male	Female
Population	523	266	257
Children aged below 6 years	69	31	38
Scheduled caste	209	104	105
Scheduled tribe	0	0	0
Literates	299	175	124
Workers (all)	275	153	122
Main workers (total)	68	52	16
Main workers: Cultivators	47	37	10
Main workers: Agricultural labourers	15	10	5
Main workers: Household industry workers	0	0	0
Main workers: Other	6	5	1
Marginal workers (total)	207	101	106
Marginal workers: Cultivators	33	29	4
Marginal workers: Agricultural labourers	166	69	97
Marginal workers: Household industry workers	1	1	0
Marginal workers: Others	7	2	5
Non-workers	248	113	135
