= Beelkhoh =

- village
- Location within Madhya Pradesh Location within India
- Coordinates: 23.790550°N 77.429253°E
- Country: India
- State: Madhya Pradesh
- District: Bhopal
- Tehsil: Berasia

Population (2011)
  - Total: 1,623
- Time zone: UTC+5:30 (IST)
- ISO 3166 code: MP-IN
- Census code: 482146

Beelkhoh is a village in the Bhopal district of Madhya Pradesh, India. It is located in the Berasia tehsil.

== Demographics ==
According to the 2011 census of India, Beelkhoh has 299 households. The effective literacy rate (i.e. the literacy rate of population excluding children aged 6 and below) is 60.12%.

Demographics (2011 Census)
	Total	Male	Female
Population	1623	876	747
Children aged below 6 years	294	147	147
Scheduled caste	574	312	262
Scheduled tribe	53	26	27
Literates	799	505	294
Workers (all)	735	453	282
Main workers (total)	628	434	194
Main workers: Cultivators	152	127	25
Main workers: Agricultural labourers	411	255	156
Main workers: Household industry workers	32	25	7
Main workers: Other	33	27	6
Marginal workers (total)	107	19	88
Marginal workers: Cultivators	30	4	26
Marginal workers: Agricultural labourers	29	4	25
Marginal workers: Household industry workers	29	4	25
Marginal workers: Others	19	7	12
Non-workers	888	423	465
