= Semra Bheropura =

- village
- Location within Madhya Pradesh Location within India
- Coordinates: 23.638191°N 77.266121°E
- Country: India
- State: Madhya Pradesh
- District: Bhopal
- Tehsil: Berasia

Population (2011)
  - Total: 834
- Time zone: UTC+5:30 (IST)
- ISO 3166 code: MP-IN
- Census code: 482104

Semra Bheropura is a village in the Bhopal district of Madhya Pradesh, India. It is located in the Berasia tehsil.

== Demographics ==
According to the 2011 census of India, Semra Bheropura has 206 households. The effective literacy rate (i.e. the literacy rate of population excluding children aged 6 and below) is 70.45%.

Demographics (2011 Census)
	Total	Male	Female
Population	834	455	379
Children aged below 6 years	93	59	34
Scheduled caste	53	26	27
Scheduled tribe	0	0	0
Literates	522	300	222
Workers (all)	335	241	94
Main workers (total)	183	165	18
Main workers: Cultivators	140	131	9
Main workers: Agricultural labourers	27	24	3
Main workers: Household industry workers	0	0	0
Main workers: Other	16	10	6
Marginal workers (total)	152	76	76
Marginal workers: Cultivators	22	7	15
Marginal workers: Agricultural labourers	114	58	56
Marginal workers: Household industry workers	1	1	0
Marginal workers: Others	15	10	5
Non-workers	499	214	285
