= Barela Kheda =

- village
- Location within Madhya Pradesh Location within India
- Coordinates: 23.701021°N 77.551425°E
- Country: India
- State: Madhya Pradesh
- District: Bhopal
- Tehsil: Berasia

Population (2011)
  - Total: 344
- Time zone: UTC+5:30 (IST)
- ISO 3166 code: MP-IN
- Census code: 482186

Barela Kheda is a village in the Bhopal district of Madhya Pradesh, India. It is located in the Berasia tehsil.

== Demographics ==
According to the 2011 census of India, Barela Kheda has 71 households. The effective literacy rate (i.e. the literacy rate of population excluding children aged 6 and below) is 64.36%.

Demographics (2011 Census)
	Total	Male	Female
Population	344	192	152
Children aged below 6 years	69	37	32
Scheduled caste	145	88	57
Scheduled tribe	0	0	0
Literates	177	120	57
Workers (all)	132	96	36
Main workers (total)	127	93	34
Main workers: Cultivators	27	21	6
Main workers: Agricultural labourers	96	69	27
Main workers: Household industry workers	0	0	0
Main workers: Other	4	3	1
Marginal workers (total)	5	3	2
Marginal workers: Cultivators	0	0	0
Marginal workers: Agricultural labourers	5	3	2
Marginal workers: Household industry workers	0	0	0
Marginal workers: Others	0	0	0
Non-workers	212	96	116
