= Gana Khedi =

- village
- Location within Madhya Pradesh Location within India
- Coordinates: 23.883493°N 77.303313°E
- Country: India
- State: Madhya Pradesh
- District: Bhopal
- Tehsil: Berasia

Population (2011)
  - Total: 553
- Time zone: UTC+5:30 (IST)
- ISO 3166 code: MP-IN
- Census code: 482048

Gana Khedi is a village in the Bhopal district of Madhya Pradesh, India. It is located in the Berasia tehsil.

== Demographics ==
According to the 2011 census of India, Gana Khedi has 111 households. The effective literacy rate (i.e. the literacy rate of population excluding children aged 6 and below) is 55.19%.

Demographics (2011 Census)
	Total	Male	Female
Population	553	304	249
Children aged below 6 years	100	54	46
Scheduled caste	61	38	23
Scheduled tribe	0	0	0
Literates	250	173	77
Workers (all)	289	158	131
Main workers (total)	193	140	53
Main workers: Cultivators	145	129	16
Main workers: Agricultural labourers	39	7	32
Main workers: Household industry workers	2	0	2
Main workers: Other	7	4	3
Marginal workers (total)	96	18	78
Marginal workers: Cultivators	6	2	4
Marginal workers: Agricultural labourers	75	9	66
Marginal workers: Household industry workers	11	6	5
Marginal workers: Others	4	1	3
Non-workers	264	146	118
