= Garha Khurd =

- village
- Location within Madhya Pradesh Location within India
- Coordinates: 23.745651°N 77.349416°E
- Country: India
- State: Madhya Pradesh
- District: Bhopal
- Tehsil: Berasia

Population (2011)
  - Total: 624
- Time zone: UTC+5:30 (IST)
- ISO 3166 code: MP-IN
- Census code: 482129

Garha Khurd is a village in the Bhopal district of Madhya Pradesh, India. It is located in the Berasia tehsil.

== Demographics ==
According to the 2011 census of India, Garha Khurd has 117 households. The effective literacy rate (i.e. the literacy rate of population excluding children aged 6 and below) is 59.28%.

Demographics (2011 Census)
	Total	Male	Female
Population	624	324	300
Children aged below 6 years	96	49	47
Scheduled caste	310	161	149
Scheduled tribe	2	2	0
Literates	313	188	125
Workers (all)	278	163	115
Main workers (total)	142	139	3
Main workers: Cultivators	48	48	0
Main workers: Agricultural labourers	75	74	1
Main workers: Household industry workers	9	8	1
Main workers: Other	10	9	1
Marginal workers (total)	136	24	112
Marginal workers: Cultivators	1	0	1
Marginal workers: Agricultural labourers	130	24	106
Marginal workers: Household industry workers	5	0	5
Marginal workers: Others	0	0	0
Non-workers	346	161	185
