= Kalayanpura =

- village
- Location within Madhya Pradesh Location within India
- Coordinates: 23.764433°N 77.321844°E
- Country: India
- State: Madhya Pradesh
- District: Bhopal
- Tehsil: Berasia

Population (2011)
  - Total: 489
- Time zone: UTC+5:30 (IST)
- ISO 3166 code: MP-IN
- Census code: 482117

Kalayanpura is a village in the Bhopal district of Madhya Pradesh, India. It is located in the Berasia tehsil.

== Demographics ==
According to the 2011 census of India, Kalayanpura has 113 households. The effective literacy rate (i.e. the literacy rate of population excluding children aged 6 and below) is 55.67%.

Demographics (2011 Census)
	Total	Male	Female
Population	489	273	216
Children aged below 6 years	92	52	40
Scheduled caste	5	3	2
Scheduled tribe	0	0	0
Literates	221	153	68
Workers (all)	226	129	97
Main workers (total)	128	108	20
Main workers: Cultivators	95	90	5
Main workers: Agricultural labourers	25	15	10
Main workers: Household industry workers	5	2	3
Main workers: Other	3	1	2
Marginal workers (total)	98	21	77
Marginal workers: Cultivators	8	3	5
Marginal workers: Agricultural labourers	83	15	68
Marginal workers: Household industry workers	1	0	1
Marginal workers: Others	6	3	3
Non-workers	263	144	119
