= Khai Kheda =

- village
- Location within Madhya Pradesh Location within India
- Coordinates: 23.747437°N 77.564343°E
- Country: India
- State: Madhya Pradesh
- District: Bhopal
- Tehsil: Berasia

Population (2011)
  - Total: 270
- Time zone: UTC+5:30 (IST)
- ISO 3166 code: MP-IN
- Census code: 482167

Khai Kheda is a village in the Bhopal district of Madhya Pradesh, India. It is located in the Berasia tehsil.

== Demographics ==
According to the 2011 census of India, Khai Kheda has 45 households. The effective literacy rate (i.e. the literacy rate of population excluding children aged 6 and below) is 60.37%.

Demographics (2011 Census)
	Total	Male	Female
Population	270	143	127
Children aged below 6 years	53	21	32
Scheduled caste	0	0	0
Scheduled tribe	0	0	0
Literates	131	87	44
Workers (all)	126	75	51
Main workers (total)	18	17	1
Main workers: Cultivators	15	14	1
Main workers: Agricultural labourers	3	3	0
Main workers: Household industry workers	0	0	0
Main workers: Other	0	0	0
Marginal workers (total)	108	58	50
Marginal workers: Cultivators	6	5	1
Marginal workers: Agricultural labourers	102	53	49
Marginal workers: Household industry workers	0	0	0
Marginal workers: Others	0	0	0
Non-workers	144	68	76
