= Khejra Misar =

- village
- Location within Madhya Pradesh Location within India
- Coordinates: 23.698262°N 77.452012°E
- Country: India
- State: Madhya Pradesh
- District: Bhopal
- Tehsil: Berasia

Population (2011)
  - Total: 863
- Time zone: UTC+5:30 (IST)
- ISO 3166 code: MP-IN
- Census code: 482156

Khejra Misar is a village in the Bhopal district of Madhya Pradesh, India. It is located in the Berasia tehsil.

== Demographics ==
According to the 2011 census of India, Khejra Misar has 141 households. The effective literacy rate (i.e. the literacy rate of population excluding children aged 6 and below) is 50.63%.

Demographics (2011 Census)
	Total	Male	Female
Population	863	462	401
Children aged below 6 years	150	72	78
Scheduled caste	298	173	125
Scheduled tribe	10	4	6
Literates	361	238	123
Workers (all)	446	242	204
Main workers (total)	130	87	43
Main workers: Cultivators	61	59	2
Main workers: Agricultural labourers	48	19	29
Main workers: Household industry workers	2	2	0
Main workers: Other	19	7	12
Marginal workers (total)	316	155	161
Marginal workers: Cultivators	14	10	4
Marginal workers: Agricultural labourers	253	130	123
Marginal workers: Household industry workers	6	2	4
Marginal workers: Others	43	13	30
Non-workers	417	220	197
