= Neem Khedi =

- village
- Location within Madhya Pradesh Location within India
- Coordinates: 23.745846°N 77.249606°E
- Country: India
- State: Madhya Pradesh
- District: Bhopal
- Tehsil: Berasia

Population (2011)
  - Total: 801
- Time zone: UTC+5:30 (IST)
- ISO 3166 code: MP-IN
- Census code: 482079

Neem Khedi is a village in the Bhopal district of Madhya Pradesh, India. It is located in the Berasia tehsil.

== Demographics ==
According to the 2011 census of India, Neem Khedi has 173 households. The effective literacy rate (i.e. the literacy rate of population excluding children aged 6 and below) is 54.13%.

Demographics (2011 Census)
	Total	Male	Female
Population	801	409	392
Children aged below 6 years	123	59	64
Scheduled caste	203	102	101
Scheduled tribe	13	5	8
Literates	367	229	138
Workers (all)	423	220	203
Main workers (total)	205	197	8
Main workers: Cultivators	116	113	3
Main workers: Agricultural labourers	87	82	5
Main workers: Household industry workers	0	0	0
Main workers: Other	2	2	0
Marginal workers (total)	218	23	195
Marginal workers: Cultivators	106	8	98
Marginal workers: Agricultural labourers	109	15	94
Marginal workers: Household industry workers	1	0	1
Marginal workers: Others	2	0	2
Non-workers	378	189	189
