= Berkhedi =

- village
- Location within Madhya Pradesh Location within India
- Coordinates: 23.763530°N 77.450038°E
- Country: India
- State: Madhya Pradesh
- District: Bhopal
- Tehsil: Berasia

Population (2011)
  - Total: 428
- Time zone: UTC+5:30 (IST)
- ISO 3166 code: MP-IN
- Census code: 482150

Berkhedi is a village in the Bhopal district of Madhya Pradesh, India. It is located in the Berasia tehsil.

== Demographics ==
According to the 2011 census of India, Berkhedi has 93 households. The effective literacy rate (i.e. the literacy rate of population excluding children aged 6 and below) is 52.56%.

Demographics (2011 Census)
	Total	Male	Female
Population	428	227	201
Children aged below 6 years	76	41	35
Scheduled caste	88	43	45
Scheduled tribe	0	0	0
Literates	185	102	83
Workers (all)	175	106	69
Main workers (total)	92	91	1
Main workers: Cultivators	62	62	0
Main workers: Agricultural labourers	30	29	1
Main workers: Household industry workers	0	0	0
Main workers: Other	0	0	0
Marginal workers (total)	83	15	68
Marginal workers: Cultivators	19	7	12
Marginal workers: Agricultural labourers	64	8	56
Marginal workers: Household industry workers	0	0	0
Marginal workers: Others	0	0	0
Non-workers	253	121	132
