= Bhainsana =

- village
- Location within Madhya Pradesh Location within India
- Coordinates: 23.785836°N 77.324870°E
- Country: India
- State: Madhya Pradesh
- District: Bhopal
- Tehsil: Berasia

Population (2011)
  - Total: 417
- Time zone: UTC+5:30 (IST)
- ISO 3166 code: MP-IN
- Census code: 482070

Bhainsana is a village in the Bhopal district of Madhya Pradesh, India. It is located in the Berasia tehsil.

== Demographics ==
According to the 2011 census of India, Bhainsana has 91 households. The effective literacy rate (i.e. the literacy rate of population excluding children aged 6 and below) is 44.28%.

Demographics (2011 Census)
	Total	Male	Female
Population	417	225	192
Children aged below 6 years	85	47	38
Scheduled caste	2	1	1
Scheduled tribe	0	0	0
Literates	147	87	60
Workers (all)	239	135	104
Main workers (total)	147	118	29
Main workers: Cultivators	128	105	23
Main workers: Agricultural labourers	11	7	4
Main workers: Household industry workers	2	2	0
Main workers: Other	6	4	2
Marginal workers (total)	92	17	75
Marginal workers: Cultivators	57	12	45
Marginal workers: Agricultural labourers	27	3	24
Marginal workers: Household industry workers	0	0	0
Marginal workers: Others	8	2	6
Non-workers	178	90	88
