= Pasaiya =

- village
- Location within Madhya Pradesh Location within India
- Coordinates: 23.737891°N 77.376703°E
- Country: India
- State: Madhya Pradesh
- District: Bhopal
- Tehsil: Berasia

Population (2011)
  - Total: 671
- Time zone: UTC+5:30 (IST)
- ISO 3166 code: MP-IN
- Census code: 482133

Pasaiya is a village in the Bhopal district of Madhya Pradesh, India. It is located in the Berasia tehsil.

== Demographics ==
According to the 2011 census of India, Pasaiya has 141 households. The effective literacy rate (i.e. the literacy rate of population excluding children aged 6 and below) is 37.9%.

Demographics (2011 Census)
	Total	Male	Female
Population	671	348	323
Children aged below 6 years	146	73	73
Scheduled caste	59	29	30
Scheduled tribe	37	17	20
Literates	199	128	71
Workers (all)	195	163	32
Main workers (total)	194	162	32
Main workers: Cultivators	118	113	5
Main workers: Agricultural labourers	68	45	23
Main workers: Household industry workers	0	0	0
Main workers: Other	8	4	4
Marginal workers (total)	1	1	0
Marginal workers: Cultivators	0	0	0
Marginal workers: Agricultural labourers	1	1	0
Marginal workers: Household industry workers	0	0	0
Marginal workers: Others	0	0	0
Non-workers	476	185	291
