= Bamhora =

- village
- Location within Madhya Pradesh Location within India
- Coordinates: 26.515857°N 78.223673°E
- Country: India
- State: Madhya Pradesh
- District: Bhopal
- Tehsil: Berasia

Population (2011)
  - Total: 403
- Time zone: UTC+5:30 (IST)
- ISO 3166 code: MP-IN
- Census code: 482108

Bamhora is a village in the Bhopal district of Madhya Pradesh, India. It is located in the Berasia tehsil.

== Demographics ==
According to the 2011 census of India, Bamhora has 86 households. The effective literacy rate (i.e. the literacy rate of population excluding children aged 6 and below) is 44.71%.

Demographics (2011 Census)
	Total	Male	Female
Population	403	213	190
Children aged below 6 years	63	36	27
Scheduled caste	4	2	2
Scheduled tribe	0	0	0
Literates	152	87	65
Workers (all)	242	128	114
Main workers (total)	175	100	75
Main workers: Cultivators	82	66	16
Main workers: Agricultural labourers	88	29	59
Main workers: Household industry workers	0	0	0
Main workers: Other	5	5	0
Marginal workers (total)	67	28	39
Marginal workers: Cultivators	4	1	3
Marginal workers: Agricultural labourers	62	26	36
Marginal workers: Household industry workers	0	0	0
Marginal workers: Others	1	1	0
Non-workers	161	85	76
