= Bandrua =

- village
- Location within Madhya Pradesh Location within India
- Coordinates: 23.764329°N 77.431400°E
- Country: India
- State: Madhya Pradesh
- District: Bhopal
- Tehsil: Berasia

Population (2011)
  - Total: 609
- Time zone: UTC+5:30 (IST)
- ISO 3166 code: MP-IN
- Census code: 482149

Bandrua is a village in the Bhopal district of Madhya Pradesh, India. It is located in the Berasia tehsil.

== Demographics ==
According to the 2011 census of India, Bandrua has 118 households. The effective literacy rate (i.e. the literacy rate of population excluding children aged 6 and below) is 53.16%.

Demographics (2011 Census)
	Total	Male	Female
Population	609	313	296
Children aged below 6 years	103	44	59
Scheduled caste	100	47	53
Scheduled tribe	0	0	0
Literates	269	163	106
Workers (all)	347	185	162
Main workers (total)	322	175	147
Main workers: Cultivators	119	65	54
Main workers: Agricultural labourers	189	104	85
Main workers: Household industry workers	1	1	0
Main workers: Other	13	5	8
Marginal workers (total)	25	10	15
Marginal workers: Cultivators	0	0	0
Marginal workers: Agricultural labourers	12	5	7
Marginal workers: Household industry workers	1	0	1
Marginal workers: Others	12	5	7
Non-workers	262	128	134
