= Charpahari =

- village
- Location within Madhya Pradesh Location within India
- Coordinates: 23.623513°N 77.530815°E
- Country: India
- State: Madhya Pradesh
- District: Bhopal
- Tehsil: Berasia

Population (2011)
  - Total: 239
- Time zone: UTC+5:30 (IST)
- ISO 3166 code: MP-IN
- Census code: 482197

Charpahari is a village in the Bhopal district of Madhya Pradesh, India. It is located in the Berasia tehsil.

== Demographics ==
According to the 2011 census of India, Charpahari has 52 households. The effective literacy rate (i.e. the literacy rate of population excluding children aged 6 and below) is 54.41%.

Demographics (2011 Census)
	Total	Male	Female
Population	239	126	113
Children aged below 6 years	35	15	20
Scheduled caste	54	27	27
Scheduled tribe	125	65	60
Literates	111	71	40
Workers (all)	99	65	34
Main workers (total)	68	52	16
Main workers: Cultivators	38	31	7
Main workers: Agricultural labourers	17	11	6
Main workers: Household industry workers	1	1	0
Main workers: Other	12	9	3
Marginal workers (total)	31	13	18
Marginal workers: Cultivators	8	0	8
Marginal workers: Agricultural labourers	22	13	9
Marginal workers: Household industry workers	0	0	0
Marginal workers: Others	1	0	1
Non-workers	140	61	79
