= Indarpura =

- village
- Location within Madhya Pradesh Location within India
- Coordinates: 23.741675°N 77.432849°E
- Country: India
- State: Madhya Pradesh
- District: Bhopal
- Tehsil: Berasia

Population (2011)
  - Total: 361
- Time zone: UTC+5:30 (IST)
- ISO 3166 code: MP-IN
- Census code: 482151

Indarpura is a village in the Bhopal district of Madhya Pradesh, India. It is located in the Berasia tehsil.

== Demographics ==
According to the 2011 census of India, Indarpura has 86 households. The effective literacy rate (i.e. the literacy rate of population excluding children aged 6 and below) is 64.5%.

Demographics (2011 Census)
	Total	Male	Female
Population	361	198	163
Children aged below 6 years	54	29	25
Scheduled caste	27	17	10
Scheduled tribe	6	3	3
Literates	198	130	68
Workers (all)	132	105	27
Main workers (total)	69	64	5
Main workers: Cultivators	55	53	2
Main workers: Agricultural labourers	7	5	2
Main workers: Household industry workers	1	1	0
Main workers: Other	6	5	1
Marginal workers (total)	63	41	22
Marginal workers: Cultivators	25	17	8
Marginal workers: Agricultural labourers	37	24	13
Marginal workers: Household industry workers	0	0	0
Marginal workers: Others	1	0	1
Non-workers	229	93	136
