= Mainapura =

- village
- Location within Madhya Pradesh Location within India
- Coordinates: 23.792645°N 77.298048°E
- Country: India
- State: Madhya Pradesh
- District: Bhopal
- Tehsil: Berasia

Population (2011)
  - Total: 349
- Time zone: UTC+5:30 (IST)
- ISO 3166 code: MP-IN
- Census code: 482069

Mainapura is a village in the Bhopal district of Madhya Pradesh, India. It is located in the Berasia tehsil.

== Demographics ==
According to the 2011 census of India, Mainapura has 66 households. The effective literacy rate (i.e. the literacy rate of population excluding children aged 6 and below) is 34.52%.

Demographics (2011 Census)
	Total	Male	Female
Population	349	179	170
Children aged below 6 years	68	35	33
Scheduled caste	11	6	5
Scheduled tribe	0	0	0
Literates	97	55	42
Workers (all)	108	90	18
Main workers (total)	39	39	0
Main workers: Cultivators	35	35	0
Main workers: Agricultural labourers	2	2	0
Main workers: Household industry workers	1	1	0
Main workers: Other	1	1	0
Marginal workers (total)	69	51	18
Marginal workers: Cultivators	15	14	1
Marginal workers: Agricultural labourers	52	37	15
Marginal workers: Household industry workers	0	0	0
Marginal workers: Others	2	0	2
Non-workers	241	89	152
