= Manakund =

- village
- Location within Madhya Pradesh Location within India
- Coordinates: 23.768719°N 77.373465°E
- Country: India
- State: Madhya Pradesh
- District: Bhopal
- Tehsil: Berasia

Population (2011)
  - Total: 655
- Time zone: UTC+5:30 (IST)
- ISO 3166 code: MP-IN
- Census code: 482131

Manakund is a village in the Bhopal district of Madhya Pradesh, India. It is located in the Berasia tehsil.

== Demographics ==
According to the 2011 census of India, Manakund has 138 households. The effective literacy rate (i.e. the literacy rate of population excluding children aged 6 and below) is 66.13%.

Demographics (2011 Census)
	Total	Male	Female
Population	655	359	296
Children aged below 6 years	100	51	49
Scheduled caste	101	51	50
Scheduled tribe	0	0	0
Literates	367	247	120
Workers (all)	354	201	153
Main workers (total)	117	108	9
Main workers: Cultivators	92	88	4
Main workers: Agricultural labourers	19	14	5
Main workers: Household industry workers	2	2	0
Main workers: Other	4	4	0
Marginal workers (total)	237	93	144
Marginal workers: Cultivators	7	4	3
Marginal workers: Agricultural labourers	226	86	140
Marginal workers: Household industry workers	1	0	1
Marginal workers: Others	3	3	0
Non-workers	301	158	143
