= Mengra =

- village
- Location within Madhya Pradesh Location within India
- Coordinates: 23.698116°N 77.187619°E
- Country: India
- State: Madhya Pradesh
- District: Bhopal
- Tehsil: Berasia

Population (2011)
  - Total: 618
- Time zone: UTC+5:30 (IST)
- ISO 3166 code: MP-IN
- Census code: 482084

Mengra is a village in the Bhopal district of Madhya Pradesh, India. It is located in the Berasia tehsil.

== Demographics ==
According to the 2011 census of India, Mengra has 118 households. The effective literacy rate (i.e. the literacy rate of population excluding children aged 6 and below) is 50.1%.

Demographics (2011 Census)
	Total	Male	Female
Population	618	320	298
Children aged below 6 years	115	61	54
Scheduled caste	89	53	36
Scheduled tribe	0	0	0
Literates	252	167	85
Workers (all)	300	153	147
Main workers (total)	300	153	147
Main workers: Cultivators	119	114	5
Main workers: Agricultural labourers	173	35	138
Main workers: Household industry workers	0	0	0
Main workers: Other	8	4	4
Marginal workers (total)	0	0	0
Marginal workers: Cultivators	0	0	0
Marginal workers: Agricultural labourers	0	0	0
Marginal workers: Household industry workers	0	0	0
Marginal workers: Others	0	0	0
Non-workers	318	167	151
