= Padli =

- Village
- Location within Madhya Pradesh Location within India
- Coordinates: 23.192191°N 77.190532°E
- Country: India
- State: Madhya Pradesh
- District: Bhopal
- Tehsil: Berasia

Population (2011)
  - Total: 337
- Time zone: UTC+5:30 (IST)
- ISO 3166 code: MP-IN
- Census code: 482091

Padli is a village in the Bhopal district of Madhya Pradesh, India. It is located in the Berasia tehsil.

== Demographics ==
According to the 2011 census of India, Padli has 70 households. The effective literacy rate (i.e. the literacy rate of population excluding children aged 6 and below) is 71.08%.

Demographics (2011 Census)
	Total	Male	Female
Population	337	178	159
Children aged below 6 years	50	27	23
Scheduled caste	19	13	6
Scheduled tribe	50	28	22
Literates	204	121	83
Workers (all)	149	80	69
Main workers (total)	90	63	27
Main workers: Cultivators	66	52	14
Main workers: Agricultural labourers	22	10	12
Main workers: Household industry workers	0	0	0
Main workers: Other	2	1	1
Marginal workers (total)	59	17	42
Marginal workers: Cultivators	9	3	6
Marginal workers: Agricultural labourers	47	14	33
Marginal workers: Household industry workers	0	0	0
Marginal workers: Others	3	0	3
Non-workers	188	98	90
