= Damila =

- village
- Location within Madhya Pradesh Location within India
- Coordinates: 23.720327°N 77.306723°E
- Country: India
- State: Madhya Pradesh
- District: Bhopal
- Tehsil: Berasia

Population (2011)
  - Total: 613
- Time zone: UTC+5:30 (IST)
- ISO 3166 code: MP-IN
- Census code: 482120

Damila is a village in the Bhopal district of Madhya Pradesh, India. It is located in the Berasia tehsil.

== Demographics ==
According to the 2011 census of India, Damila has 117 households. The effective literacy rate (i.e. the literacy rate of population excluding children aged 6 and below) is 55.98%.

Demographics (2011 Census)
	Total	Male	Female
Population	613	325	288
Children aged below 6 years	86	46	40
Scheduled caste	0	0	0
Scheduled tribe	0	0	0
Literates	295	191	104
Workers (all)	332	176	156
Main workers (total)	106	105	1
Main workers: Cultivators	81	80	1
Main workers: Agricultural labourers	18	18	0
Main workers: Household industry workers	1	1	0
Main workers: Other	6	6	0
Marginal workers (total)	226	71	155
Marginal workers: Cultivators	121	23	98
Marginal workers: Agricultural labourers	102	47	55
Marginal workers: Household industry workers	2	1	1
Marginal workers: Others	1	0	1
Non-workers	281	149	132
